= List of baseball tabletop games =

This is a list of baseball tabletop games. Some of them are still available, some of them are not on the market anymore.

- All Star Baseball
- APBA Baseball - http://apbagames.com/
- Baseball (card game)'
- Challenge The Yankees
- Diceball
- Dynasty League Baseball
- MLB Showdown
- Replay Baseball
- Statis Pro Baseball - http://forums.delphiforums.com/statprobaseball/start
- Strat-O-Matic Baseball - https://www.strat-o-matic.com/
- Season Ticket Baseball
- Triple Threat Baseball
- Card League Baseball - https://www.cardleaguebaseball.com/
