= 1993 in games =

This page lists board and card games, wargames, miniatures games, and tabletop role-playing games published in 1993. For video games, see 1993 in video gaming.

== Games released or invented in 1993 ==
- Amazing Engine (role-playing game)
- Carat
- Cartoon Game
- Cybergeneration (role-playing game)
- Dirty Money (game)
- DragonStrike
- Earthdawn (role-playing game)
- Forgotten Futures (role-playing game)
- Hacker II: The Dark Side
- Mage: The Ascension (role-playing game)
- Magic: The Gathering
- Pandemonium (role-playing game)
- Prime Directive (role-playing game)
- Risus: The Anything RPG (role-playing game system)
- SLA Industries (role-playing game)
- Star Riders (role-playing game)
- Total Attack!! Soccer
- Uncle Happy's Train Game
- Underground (role-playing game)
- We the People (board wargame)

== Game awards given in 1993 ==
- Spiel des Jahres: Call My Bluff
- Deutscher Spiele Preis: Modern Art
  - Best Children's Game: Verflixt Gemixt
- Games: Inklings

== Significant game-related events in 1993 ==
- Magic: The Gathering was released by Wizards of the Coast, becoming the first popular collectible card game.
- Alderac Entertainment Group was founded by Jolly Blackburn.

== Deaths ==
Date	Name	Age	Notability
February 3	Paul J. Gruen	52	Game designer
April 4	Alfred Mosher Butts	93	Designer of Scrabble
September 15	Ethan Allen	89	Baseball player who designed All Star Baseball

== See also ==
- 1993 in video games
