= Replay Publishing =

American game company

Replay Publishing is a game company based in Ohiopyle, Pennsylvania, that develops and publishes sports simulation games for the tabletop and computer. They currently produce Replay Baseball, Replay Basketball, and PC Replay Baseball. Competitors past and present include APBA, Diceball, Strat-O-Matic, Big League Manager, Design Depot, Negamco, Pursue the Pennant and Statis Pro Baseball.

Replay Baseball was first developed by Norm Roth and John Brodak, and first published in 1973 by Replay Games of Carmichaels, Pennsylvania. They continued publishing the game until 1991, when they moved on to other pursuits due to the rising financial cost due to licensing with the Major League Baseball Players Association. In 1998, Pete Ventura and Replay Publishing resurrected the franchise with the release of their first yearbook for Replay Baseball. A brand new Replay Basketball was released in 2003, and PC Replay Baseball was created for computer play and released in 2009.

In August 2007, the company held Replay Retreat 2007 in Pittsburgh, Pennsylvania. In July 2014, another Replay Retreat was held in Pittsburgh. Replayers from all over the nation came for a weekend of fellowship and gaming. A tournament was held and Michigan teacher Jim Woods emerged as champion in a thrilling extra inning comeback that will never be forgotten by those that watched the final in person.

== Replay Baseball ==
Replay Baseball
- Designers: Peter Ventura
- Publishers: Replay Publishing
- Players: 1–2
- Setup time: minutes
- Playing time: 30 minutes
- Chance: Medium (dice rolling, luck)
- Age range: 13 and up

Replay Baseball is played using three dice (red, white, and blue), and a Chart Book. Play is controlled by rolling three dice (red/white/blue), and using the numbers to obtain results by referencing the pitcher and batter cards, as well as the chart book. The Chart Book is offered in two formats, the Current Chart Book being valid for the new yearbook format and for original seasons produced after 1987, and the White/Classic Chart Book being valid for original seasons produced before 1987. Playtime can be as little as 15–20 minutes per game, according to TableTop-Sports administrator Jeff Downey.

Replay fans are known to play co-op games that are coordinated in their online forum, which builds a sense of community around the game. In an interview with The Stateline Observer, player Craig Pillow noted:

"I purchased it, I tried it out and I was hooked," he said. "I started playing cooperatively in 2002 and that's what really hooked me." No longer did he feel like an oddball with a set of dice." I discovered this community."

— Craig Pillow, Stateline Observer, Craig Pillow: Replay simulation baseball, by David Green.

Replay Baseball offers a number of past seasons, in both a yearbook (precut cards) and team book (eBook only) format. In addition, there are still copies of the original game (Replay Classic) and seasons available.

Replay Baseball has been mentioned in two books to-date, with one providing a four-paragraph write-up concerning the game.

In 2004, Replay published a yearbook of the 1923 Negro National League, using full statistical data not yet published elsewhere but provided by the researcher. The data published in the yearbook remains the most complete for a single Negro league season. Company owner Pete Ventura donated a portion of his profits to a Negro Leagues Widows fund, helping out pensionless widows of Negro leaguers.

The company also donated games to Walter Reed Medical Center in 2006 and 2007 for convalescing soldiers.

=== Reception ===
Writing for Command, Dennis Agosta compared Replay Baseball to two contemporary tabletop baseball games, Strat-O-Matic Baseball and APBA Baseball, and said "Replay Baseball is the best of the three games. [Unlike APBA Baseball], Replay Baseball does not suffer from statistical inaccuracies introduced by manager actions." Agosta concluded, "Replay does not have an advanced game — all of the advanced features of S-O-M and APBA Master Game are built into the basic game and are used with no difficulty."

== Replay Basketball ==
Replay Basketball Game Book

Replay Basketball is offered in both the original dice version, and a new card-only version.

The game offers a number of past seasons in both a yearbook (precut cards or perforated card sheets) and team book (eBook only) format.

This game was independently and comprehensively reviewed by a customer and game designer, Brien Martin, on his fan site, Replay Hoops Central. Based on comments found at the company's official on-line forum, a number of potential customers have used this comprehensive review to assess their potential interest in the game.

== Second Season Pro Football ==
Second Season Game Book

Originally the creation of Keith Avallone of Plaay Games (Plaay Games), the right to publish Second Season was granted to Replay Publishing. The game is played using two dice (one black, one white) and a game book. Play begins by selecting two teams, which will face one another in the simulated game. Following kickoff, the offensive team selects a play and a target player, while the defense is chosen by a roll of a die (for solo play). Once the play and defense are determined, the two dice are rolled, and read together. For example, a black 4 and a white 3 would be read as '43' (similar to other games, such as APBA Football).

This number is then used to reference the game book, which will produce a result for the play called by the offensive coach. An example of the game book can be seen at right.

Second Season has a number of past season sets available, offered in the yearbook format. In addition, a How-To guide is also produced which allows players to create their own teams from past football seasons.

On January 20, 2010, Pete Ventura of Replay Publishing announced that Second Season Football was returning to the Plaay Games fold, who would be publishing the game beginning Summer 2010.
