= Tellem (surname) =

The Tellem were the people who inhabited the Bandiagara Escarpment. Tellem may also refer to:

- Arn Tellem (born 1954), player agent
- Nancy Tellem (born 1952), American businesswoman
- Soulja Boy Tellem (born 1990), American rapper, songwriter, record producer, actor, streamer, and entrepreneur
