= Diamond Mind =

Computer baseball simulation game

Diamond Mind Baseball is a computer baseball simulation game, created by Canadian baseball expert Tom Tippett, who released the first commercial version of the game in 1987.

The game can be considered a descendant of dice-and-charts baseball simulations such as Strat-o-Matic baseball and Pursue the Pennant. In fact, in the beginning, the game was called "Pursue The Pennant" because Tippett had a marketing relationship with the company of the same name. This relationship ended in 1995, when the game and company were officially given its current name. Pursue The Pennant itself had been revived in 1993 as a board game version, a Microsoft Windows version, and a new online version game called Dynasty League Baseball.

Diamond Mind differs from Strat-o-Matic and other games of the genre in that it is not derived from a board game; it is strictly a computer game. Tippett claims that the fact that the game is designed "from the ground up" to take advantage of the versatility and speed of the PC make it a more accurate and flexible game than its competitors, such as Strat-o-Matic. Strat-o-Matic supporters, including Strat-o-Matic founder Hal Richman, have responded to this by stating that since Diamond Mind does not reveal its source code or algorithms, there is no way to independently verify or refute its claims of superior statistical accuracy.

Diamond Mind was named PC Magazine Editor's Choice for PC-based baseball games in its June 28, 2005 issue. It is also often used by sporting publications to predict the outcome of upcoming seasons.

Diamond Mind relocated from Boston to Beaverton, Oregon in 2005. On August 14, 2006, Diamond Mind became a wholly owned subsidiary of Simnasium (now Imagine Sports), a company which has its headquarters in Silicon Valley. Tippett stepped down from his position as head of the company to take a position with the Boston Red Sox, ceding control to Simnasium CEO Dayne Myers. Tippett remains with the company as a consultant.

Over the next two years, Simnasium/Imagine Sports shifted the development of Diamond Mind away from the PC and into the online world. On May 24, 2008, Imagine Sports announced to their customers that there will be no new versions of the PC version of Diamond Mind for the foreseeable future so that the company might focus on the online version of the game. However, later in 2008, this policy changed as Diamond Mind announced a tenth version of their standalone PC game would be released in February 2009. After numerous production delays, the tenth edition of the game was finally released in June 2010.

Simnasium/Imagine has continued to provide nominal patches, and also launched Version 11 in 2015, which added player photos and expanded play by play, amongst other features.

Version 12 was released in Dec 2020.
