= Banks Sidewinder =

The Banks Sidewinder is a land speed record vehicle that was built by Gale Banks Engineering in 2001. Based on a Dodge Dakota pickup truck, the Banks Sidewinder became the fastest pickup ever when it set a speed record of 213.583 mph (343.729 km/h) at Bonneville in October 2001.

== Sidewinder Dodge Dakota Pickup ==
One of the fastest roadgoing vehicles, the Gale Banks Built Dodge Dakota has broken many speed and quarter mile records and is used as the shop truck for Gale Banks own company.

=== Overview ===
In 2002, a 5.9 L Cummins diesel-powered pickup, modified by Gale Banks and his company Gale Banks Engineering set an FIA-certified land speed record at the Bonneville Salt Flats with a one-way pass of 222-mph and a combined two-way speed of 217-mph. This record-breaking and street-legal vehicle was driven on the highway to Bonneville from Southern California and pulled its own service trailer, defying the modern racing tradition of competition vehicles being transported via trailer for legality and vehicle wear-and-tear reasons. During this trip, the Sidewinder Dakota achieved fuel economy figures of 23.6-mpg while in highway driving trim.

=== Modifications ===
Starting with a stock 5.9L Cummins straight-six engine that produced approximately 393-horsepower, Gale Banks Engineering extensively modified the engine, adding a variable geometry (VGT) Holset turbocharger, water-cooled intercooler, and six-speed transmission from New Venture Gear. The Dodge Dakota’s firewall was moved back approximately 18-inches to accommodate the new high-performance engine, which now tested on the dyno at 735-horsepower with 1300 lb-ft of torque. 300-mph speed-rated tires were also added to safely get the power to the ground.

=== Summary ===
The Gale Banks Engineering Cummins-powered Dodge Dakota is the world’s-fastest diesel or gasoline-powered pickup truck and still holds the FIA record as of late 2009. It is currently on display at the NHRA Museum National Hot Rod Association as part of their "Gale Banks: The First 50 Years" temporary exhibit.

== See also ==
- Automotive Hall of Fame
