= Blastolene Special =

Car owned by Jay Leno

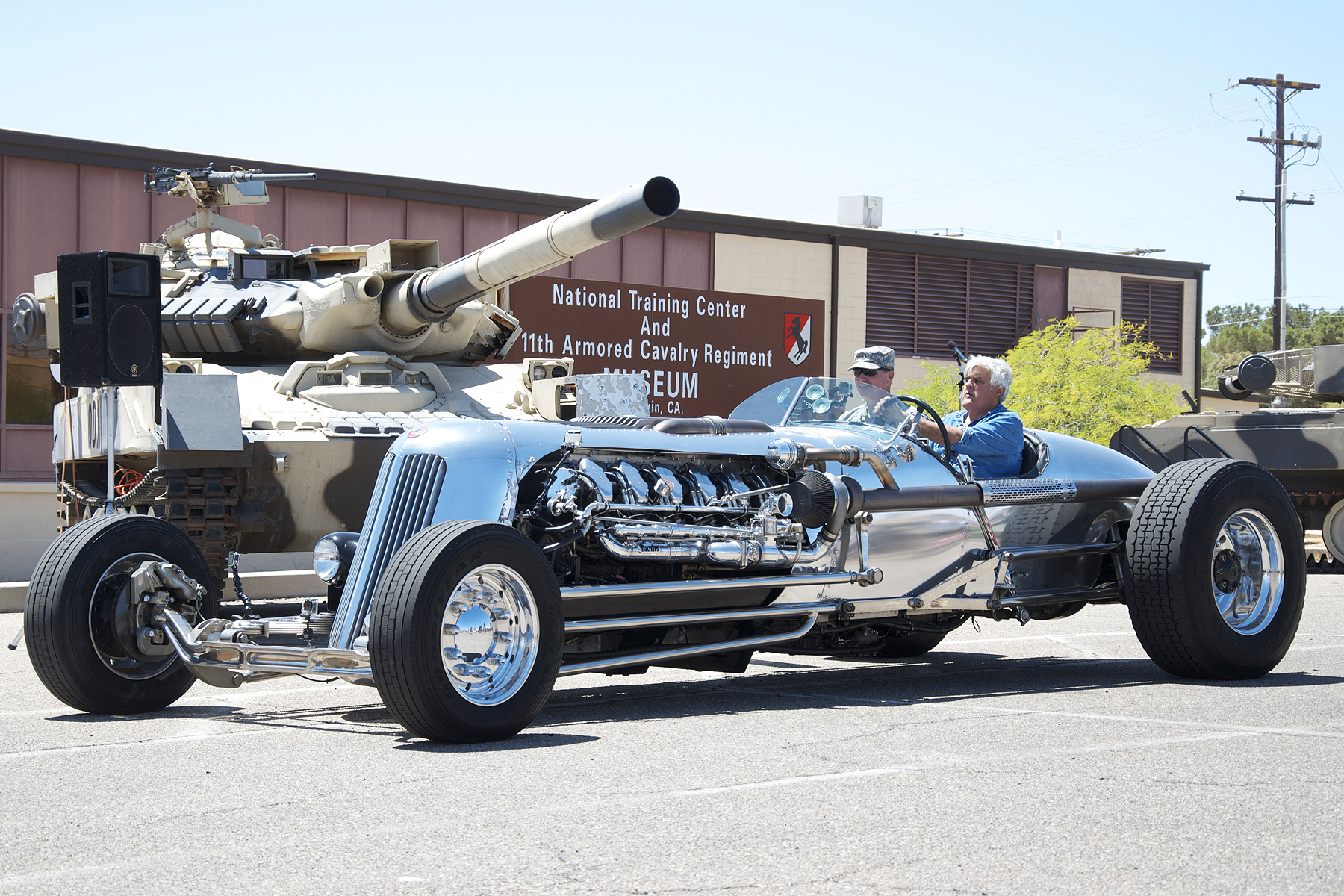
- Jay Leno driving the Blastolene Special at Fort Irwin

Overview
- Also called: Tank Car
- Production: 2001
- Assembly: Grants Pass, Oregon
- Designer: Randy Grubb

Body and chassis
- Body style: 2-seat roadster

Powertrain
- Engine: 29 L (1,792 cu in) Continental AV1790 V12 (gasoline)
- Transmission: 6-speed Allison automatic

Dimensions
- Wheelbase: 4,851 mm (191 in)
- Length: 6,400 mm (252 in)
- Width: 2,300 mm (90.7 in)
- Height: 1,460 mm (57.5 in)
- Curb weight: 4,300 kg (9,500 lb)

The Blastolene Special, also known as the "Tank Car", is a custom built car, designed and built by American craftsman Randy Grubb. The car is currently owned by American entertainer Jay Leno, who drives it on public streets, and also displays the car at various car shows and meets in the greater Los Angeles area. The Special is powered by an American military tank engine and features a custom-made aluminium body, it originally produced 810 bhp (600 kW) at 2,800 rpm and 1,560 ft lb (2,120 N·m) of torque at 2,400 rpm. The car weighs 9,500 pounds (4,300 kg) which is 1/11th the weight of the original tank from which the engine was used.

== History ==
In 2001, the Blastolene Special was built by craftsman Randy Grubb. It is powered by a Continental AV1790-5B, a huge engine that weighs as much as a Volkswagen Beetle, which was previously used in the 51-ton M47 Patton Tank in the 1950s. It also features a Greyhound bus transmission and a retro designed sheet metal body. Jay Leno put it into the extensive collection of cars he owns —84 cars and 73 motorcycles as of April 2006. The car was built at Grubb's shop in Grants Pass, Oregon.

After purchasing the car, Jay Leno made numerous enhancements to the roadworthiness of the vehicle, including a new six-speed Allison automatic gearbox, new rear brakes, new electrical system, and chassis work. The engine was later upgraded with fuel injection and twin turbochargers from Gale Banks Engineering. It now reportedly produces 1,600 hp (1,200 kW) and 3,000 lbf⋅ft (4,100 N⋅m) of torque.

== Facts ==
- Introduced as "The Jay Leno Tank Car" on Gran Turismo 4, it ended up in the game "by accident" when the development team visited Jay's garage to record some engine sounds. They noticed the car and put it in the game on behalf of their intrigue. it also Reappears in Gran Turismo 5 as "Tank Car '03"
- During one of the first freeway test drives an unsuitable oil line ruptured and dumped the entire 17 gallons of oil onto the road
- The car gets 5 miles per gallon (up from the original performance of 2–3 miles per gallon, after the transmission was replaced.)
- The engine red-lines at 2,900 rpm.
- Jay Leno brought the car on his show when interviewing Arnold Schwarzenegger and introduced it as "The Terminator car".
- Jay Leno had a tuning company, Gale Banks Engineering, add twin turbochargers to the engine, not for higher power but to get better fuel economy

== Specifications ==
With the original naturally aspirated engine:

- Quarter mile — 14.7 seconds at 93 mph (150 km/h)
- Top speed — 140 mph+
- 810 horsepower (600 kW) and 1,590 pound force-feet (2,160 N⋅m) of torque

== See also ==
- Blastolene Indy Special
