= Pursue the Pennant (video game) =

1986 video game

- Platform: MS-DOS
- Release: 1986
- Genre: Sports

Pursue the Pennant is a baseball video game published in 1986 for MS-DOS. It is based on the long-running Pursue the Pennant board game.

== Gameplay ==
Pursue the Pennant is a game in which play-by-play information comes from the current season when the game was produced.

== Reception ==
Rick Teverbaugh reviewed the game for Computer Gaming World, and stated that "If the creators can figure out a way to produce old-time teams, let the fans create their own teams and put in a computer manager, PTP will be as good a package as anything on the market. Until then, it is a good choice, given the limitations."

Duane E. Widner reviewed the game for Computer Gaming World, and stated that "The games are fast, accurate, and demand both baseball knowledge and good player instincts. This is the only game to provide for up-to-date computer league stats and real-life performance during the game."
