= Strat-O-Matic Football =

Tabletop board game produced by Strat-O-Matic

Strat-O-Matic Pro Football is a tabletop board game that was first produced by the Strat-O-Matic game company in 1968. The game is a statistically based sports game that simulates the play of American football. Each player's statistics are gathered, analyzed, and then converted into numerical results which reflect each player's production for a given year. These numerical results are placed on a set of cards, with each team having its own set. In addition, a team's defensive ratings for a season are converted into card data that determines how many yards may be gained against that defense.

== Gameplay ==
The original game is played with dice and cards. In playing a typical game, each athlete is represented by a player card, on which are printed various ratings and result tables for dice rolls. A player, who may play solitaire or against another player, is in charge of making strategic and personnel decisions for his/her team, while determining the results of his/her decisions by cross-referencing dice rolls with a system of printed charts and tables. A game of Strat-O-Matic Pro Football takes approximately 60 minutes to play.

Strat-O-Matic Pro Football is also available as a personal computer game faithfully adapted from the board game. One of the main features of the computer game is the inclusion of team-specific computer managers which will call plays and make player substitutions to simulate all of the real-life NFL teams Strat-O-Matic has released on the computer game (approximately 20 seasons from 1957 through the present). These computer managers present a competitive challenge to those who may find it difficult to find a live opponent for the board game. In addition, computer game players of Strat-O-Matic Pro Football may play head-to-head online and there are many customer-created leagues set up specifically for head-to-head play.

Although Strat-O-Matic Football is a simplification of the complicated game it simulates, there is a great deal of strategy involved. The person or computer controlling the team on offense and the person or computer controlling the team on defense for a particular play each secretly choose a play to call from among a handful of plays and in the case of defense chooses player movement if any. If the defensive play and/or player movement are designed to be effective against the choice of offensive play (this is the goal of the person or computer controlling the defensive team) then the play is less likely to be successful for the offense. For example, if the defense calls "pass" and the offense calls a passing play then the play is less likely to be successful; further, if the defense chooses to double-team a specific receiver for the pass and the pass is intended for that receiver then the play is significantly less likely to be successful though choosing to double-team may open up other types of plays to be successful. Field goals, punts, and kickoffs are also handled individually within the game and while there is, similar to the NFL, strategy involved in when to use these plays (for example, on fourth down whether to attempt a field goal, to punt, or to go for a first down) there is little strategy associated with these kicking plays.

Each game is decided by an approximately equal amount of strategy, player talent (cards and ratings of players used in the game), and luck. A coach may win a game with a lot of luck but will likely not be successful in the long term without either good strategy or good players (or both).

When two humans are playing a game of Strat-O-Matic Football there is a significant amount of “cat-and-mouse” type strategy. For example, coach A may call a long pass on 3rd-and-2 yards to go in order to take advantage of his belief that coach B may weaken his long pass defense (by emptying his long pass zone) in an effort to strengthen his defense against shorter yardage plays (specifically runs and flat/lookin passes) on that specific play. However, coach B may be careful not to empty his long pass zone in this situation in order not to give up the big play. On the next 3rd-and-2 both coaches will be aware of what occurred on the previous situation and may adjust their strategy accordingly. Coaches who have good intuition in predicting the plays their opponents will call may gain a competitive advantage.

There are many coaching styles of playing the game which leads to diversity in playing games against different opponents. Some coaches like to call very few risky offensive plays as they call mostly runs and low risk flat/lookin passes while other coaches like to call a significant number of risky and potentially rewarding long passes. Some coaches call defensive plays with less risk such as calling run or pass without moving players (i.e. without weakening one zone to strengthen another) while other coaches gamble more on defense. This diversity is considered to be a strong point of the game as a whole and is a testament to the realism of the game as this coaching style diversity also exists in the NFL.

=== Modes of play ===
There are two primary modes of play for Strat-O-Matic Computer Football:

1. Play solo against the computer manager either setting up a league or simply playing a non-league game;
2. Play online against others live, one participant (the “host”) gives his IP address to the other participant who types in the IP address to join the host either within a league or simply playing a non-league game.

=== League types ===
There are two primary types of leagues (either solo or online):

1. Stock league in which NFL teams in their entirety are used without any modification to team rosters. For example, many people play solo stock leagues in which they play an entire season for one or more NFL teams (usually for their favorite NFL team) while the computer auto-plays all of the other games in that season. As another example there are many stock leagues for online play in which each participant controls one NFL team for an entire season.
2. Draft league in which teams are created from a shared pool of NFL players. For example, there are many draft leagues for online play in which each participant drafts from a pool of all NFL players from a particular season (often the most recently completed NFL season) and participants compete in the league with the team of players they drafted.

=== Alternate versions ===
In 1976 Strat-O-Matic produced the first version of its college football game. This board game is similar to the pro version in play calling, outcomes, timing and use of the 20 card "split" deck. The differences between the pro and college game are listed below.

1. Once the offensive and defensive plays have been called the result is derived from the differential of natural numbers (offense - defense) from two simultaneously played cards. The difference is then used to enter the proper cell of the team sheet (odd numbers use the offensive sheet, even use defensive) to get the result. Thus the randomness of the dice roll in the pro version is eliminated. However, since the offensive and defensive players can both play numbers 1 to 10 (in addition to the play call), the basic game play calling is more complex than that of the pro version;
2. No individual players are used per se. Each team is represented by two sheets - a red and blue two sided scrimmage sheet and a special teams sheet (kickoffs, returns, etc.). In spite of this, Strat-O-Matic did include a brochure listing the lead offensive playmakers for the given team and given year;
3. Solitaire play is much more difficult in the first college version (because of the absence of dice). The game is really designed to be played face to face by two to four players;
4. Finally, the first college edition features the opportunity to play teams from different times. The game includes teams from the 1950s, 1960s and 1970s and is designed so that the matchups accurately represent the strengths of schedules.

The company only produced the version for a couple of years and replaced it with the second version which plays almost exactly as the pro football game.

=== Plays ===
There are five primary running plays and five primary passing plays for the offense to choose from and the offense must also choose the intended target for the play: the ball carrier for a running play or the intended receiver for a passing play.

The five running plays are End Run Left, Off Tackle Left, Linebuck, Off Tackle Right, and End Run Right. Choice of left or right makes a difference in the yardage gained or lost on a play only in two ways: a) determining which offensive and defensive players are involved in trying to block for or tackle the ball carrier and b) whether or not the defense has strengthened its run defense on that side. For example, if the offensive coach believes that the defensive coach will strengthen his run defense against End Run Left then if the offensive coach still wants to run an End Run he should choose End Run Right.

Each of the three types of runs (End Run, Off Tackle, and Linebuck) uses its own columns on the ball carrier’s cards and on the defensive cards. Some ball carriers are very poor on Linebucks compared to the other two run types, some other ball carriers are very poor on End Runs compared to the other two run types, and some ball carriers are fairly balanced. Choice of which running play to use is often based upon running behind the better offensive linemen and avoiding running towards the better defensive linemen; for example, if the middle of the offensive line (Center and both Guards) is its strength then Linebuck may be a good choice unless the offensive coach believes that the defensive coach may strengthen his defense against the Linebuck.

The five passing plays are Flat Pass Left, Lookin, Flat Pass Right, Short Pass, and Long Pass. Flat Pass Left, Lookin, and Flat Pass Right are the same type of passing play and use the same columns for resolution; choice of left, right, or middle (lookin) makes a difference in play resolution in two ways: a) determining which defender is involved in attempting to defend the play and b) whether or not the defense has strengthened (or weakened) its flat/lookin defense in that specific target zone. Flat/lookin passes are designed to gain approximately 4-10 yards when successful although they may go for much more or much less (including negative yardage for flat passes but not for lookin passes) depending upon the defensive play called, player movement, player talent (cards and ratings), and the luck of the dice on the play. Short passes are designed to gain 10-15 yards when successful although they may go for more yardage. Long passes are designed to gain 25 or more yards when successful. Flat/lookin passes are the least risky of the three pass types as interception and sack chances are low while long passes incur the greatest risk of interception or sack of the three pass types.

There are four defensive plays to choose from: Run, Pass, Short Yardage, and Run-Key. Run and Pass are the primary plays while Short Yardage is designed to focus even more than Run on helping support against a running play (while further weakening the defense against a pass) and Run-Key is designed to focus on attempting to completely stop a specific ball carrier (while very significantly weakening the defense against a pass). In addition, there are many variations of defensive player movement allowed as all linebackers and the free safety are eligible to move into some adjacent zones (or farther in some cases) including blitzing and are eligible to double-team receivers (within limits). For example, a defensive coach may call pass (which does not guard well against a run) and move one or more of his linebackers to the line of scrimmage to blitz (to attempt to sack the Quarterback for a loss of yards) and also to strengthen support against the run; the advantage of blitzing linebackers while calling pass is to increase the chance for a sack and to strengthen support against the run but the disadvantage of this call is that the linebacker would vacate his flat or lookin zone leaving that type of pass with significantly less support. As another example, the free safety who is generally responsible for helping support against the long pass may instead strengthen another zone such as a flat or lookin zone, the offense does not have the capability of changing the play he has already selected but the offense may call more long passes in the future to try to take advantage of the open long pass zone if the defense moves his free safety again.

== Similarities and differences with fantasy football ==
Strat-O-Matic Football draft leagues appeal to many fans of fantasy football. In a fantasy football league participants compile a team of NFL players and as the current NFL season progresses the success of participants' teams is measured by the performance of the NFL players on their team. In a Strat-O-Matic Football draft league participants compile a team of NFL players whose cards and ratings measuring their in-game performance are determined from a prior NFL season – usually the most recently completed season although there are many draft leagues which use much older seasons instead based upon the preferences of members within the league – and participants play games using Strat-O-Matic Football. In this way participants are not only building their team of NFL players but they are also greatly affecting the outcome with the strategies they use during the game.

In a Strat-O-Matic Football draft league participants craft their teams by drafting individual players based in large part on their own preferences. For example, one league participant may focus on drafting a team with a good running game (by drafting good running backs and offensive linemen early in the draft) while another participant may focus on drafting a good run defense and/or a good pass defense; other participants may focus on a more balanced approach. It is up to individual participant to decide how to craft his team during the draft and often this decision is based upon the participant’s style of play during a game.

Both Strat-O-Matic Football and fantasy football have many “keeper” draft leagues in which NFL players are retained from one year to the next. In a keeper league participants who are able to evaluate and draft good players over the long term will excel. For example, if a keeper draft league participant drafts a player of who is young and remains good for several years then that participant will gain the benefit of the player's performances for those years unless the participant trades the player to another participant. One additional appeal of Strat-O-Matic Football keeper leagues is that it gives the participants an additional interest in watching the performances of their players during NFL games. A great majority of online Strat-O-Matic Football draft leagues are keeper leagues.

Strat-O-Matic also has a college football computer game which uses the same computer game engine as the pro game with rules modified to match the rules of college football. All of the 1-A and 1-AA teams are represented in the college game and while each player on each team has his own card or rating these cards and ratings are based more on team performance than on individual performance (unlike the pro game in which each player's card or rating represents his individual play for that season). Just as in the pro game Strat-O-Matic's college football game may be played against the computer or online against a live opponent in a league or non-league game. Unlike the pro game the college game teams do not each have their own customized computer manager but each team does have an appropriate one out of a couple dozen overall computer managers which will approximately reflect the team's real-life performance.

== Notes ==
- Strat-O-Matic Football User's Manual. 2001.
