= Blastolene Indy Special =

Retro V12-powered race car

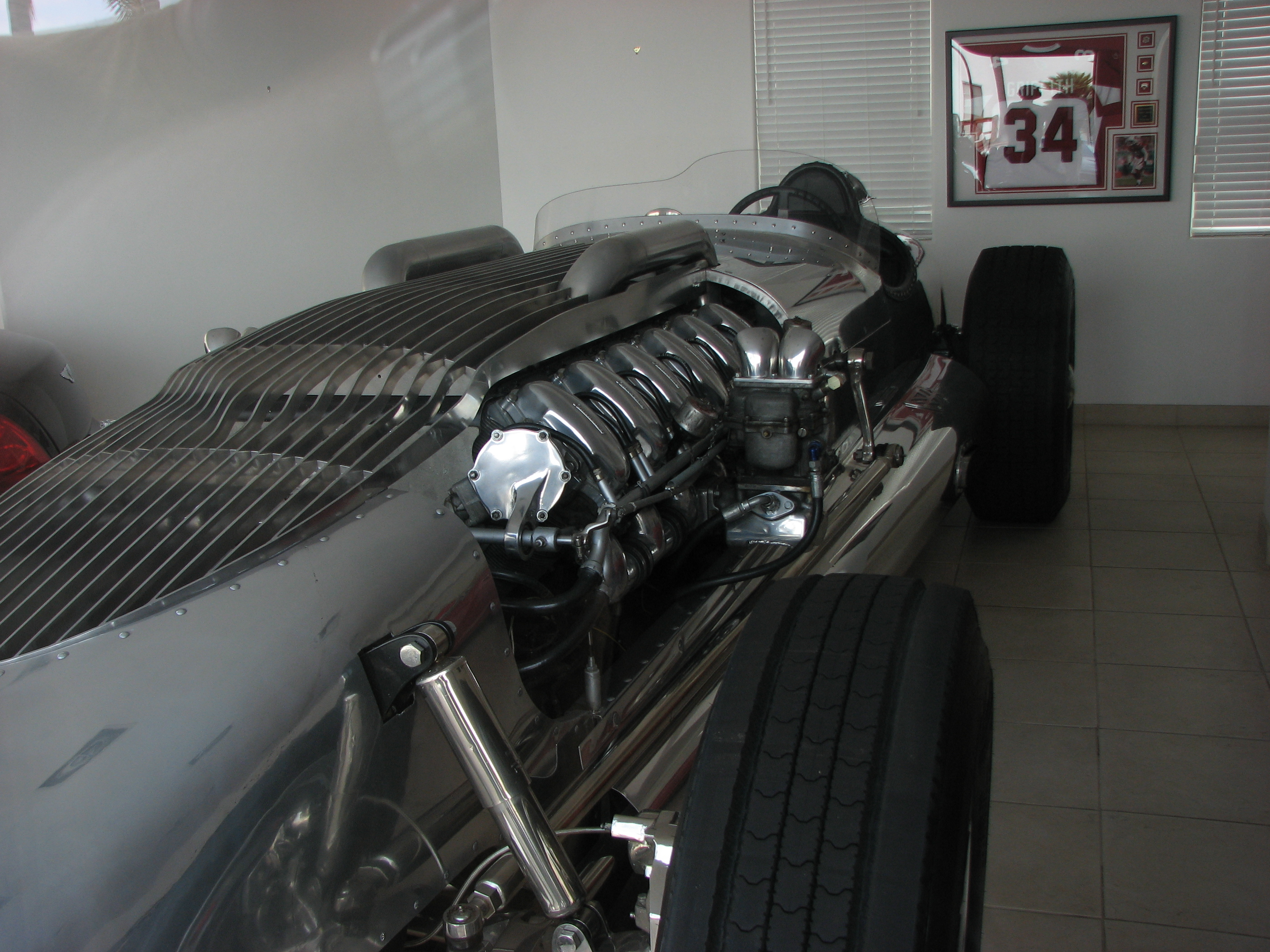
The Blastolene Indy Special

The Blastolene Indy Special is a unique, specially built car. Created from a military tank engine and a custom-made aluminium body, its engine produces 810 bhp at 2,800 rpm and 1,560 ft-lb of torque at 2,400 rpm. The successor to the Blastolene Special, the design of the Blastolene Indy Special is styled after a 1950s era Indy Car.

The car sold at auction on January 23, 2010.

== See also ==
- Rolls-Royce Merlin alternative uses
