= 1993 in video games =

1993 saw many sequels and prequels in video games, such as Dragon Ball Z: Super Butōden, Mortal Kombat II, Mega Man X, Sonic CD, Secret of Mana, and Super Street Fighter II, alongside new titles such as Star Fox, FIFA International Soccer, Doom, Gunstar Heroes, Myst, Samurai Shodown, Ridge Racer, NBA Jam, Disney's Aladdin, Virtua Fighter, and Mystery Dungeon.

This year's highest grossing video game worldwide was Capcom's arcade fighting game Street Fighter II for the third year in a row, while again being the year's highest grossing entertainment product. The best selling home system around the globe was the Nintendo Super Famicom/Super NES video game console.

== Top-rated games ==
=== Game of the Year awards ===
The following titles won Game of the Year awards for 1993.

Awards	Game of the Year	Developer	Publisher	Genre	Platform(s)	Ref
Electronic Gaming Monthly (EGM)	Samurai Shodown (Samurai Spirits)	SNK	SNK	Fighting	Neo Geo	
European Computer Trade Show	Samurai Shodown (Samurai Spirits)	SNK	SNK	Fighting	Neo Geo	
Gamest Awards	Samurai Shodown (Samurai Spirits)	SNK	SNK	Fighting	Neo Geo	
Chicago Tribune	Star Fox	Nintendo EAD	Nintendo	Rail shooter	Super NES	
Computer Gaming World Premier Awards	Doom	id Software	id Software	FPS	MS-DOS	
Electronic Gaming Awards	Disney's Aladdin	Virgin Games	Sega	Platform	Genesis	
GameFan Golden Megawards	Gunstar Heroes	Treasure	Sega	Run and gun	Genesis	
Game Informer	Mortal Kombat	Midway	Acclaim Entertainment	Fighting	Consoles	

=== Famitsu Platinum Hall of Fame ===
The following video game releases in 1993 entered Famitsu magazine's "Platinum Hall of Fame" for receiving Famitsu scores of at least 35 out of 40.

Title	Platform	Developer	Publisher	Genre	Score (out of 40)
Street Fighter II Turbo	Super Famicom	Capcom	Capcom	Fighting	36
Disney's Aladdin	Mega Drive	Virgin Games	Sega	Platformer	35
Dragon Quest I & II	Super Famicom	Chunsoft	Enix	Role-playing	35

== Financial performance ==
=== Highest-grossing arcade games ===
Street Fighter II was the highest-grossing entertainment product of 1993, earning more than the film Jurassic Park. The following table lists the year's top-grossing arcade games in Japan, the United Kingdom, United States, and worldwide.

Market	Period	Title	Coin drop revenue	Inflation	Manufacturer	Genre	Ref
Japan	—N/a	Street Fighter II' Turbo	Unknown	Unknown	Capcom	Fighting	
United Kingdom	January–June	Street Fighter II	$229 million	$540 million	Capcom	Fighting	
United States	—N/a	NBA Jam	$300 million+	$670 million+	Midway	Sports	
Worldwide		Street Fighter II	$1.5 billion	$3.4 billion	Capcom	Fighting	

==== Japan ====
The following titles were the top ten highest-grossing arcade games of 1993 in Japan.

Rank	Gamest	Game Machine		
Rank	Gamest	Title	Type	Points
1	Street Fighter II' Turbo	Street Fighter II / Dash / Turbo	Software kit	7935
2	Garō Densetsu 2: Aratanaru Tatakai (Fatal Fury 2)	Virtua Racing	Twin / Deluxe	5415
3	Puyo Puyo	Lethal Enforcers	Dedicated	4005
4	Street Fighter II Dash (Champion Edition)	Puyo Puyo	Software kit	3531
5	Tenchi wo Kurau 2: Sekiheki no Tatakai (Warriors of Fate)	Garō Densetsu 2: Aratanaru Tatakai	Software kit	2934
6	Samurai Spirits (Samurai Shodown)	Tetris (Sega)	Software kit	2856
7	World Heroes 2	Coca-Cola Suzuka 8 Hours	Deluxe / Standard	2852
8	Virtua Racing	Columns	Software kit	2697
9	Street Fighter II: The World Warrior	Final Lap 3	Standard	2638
10	Art of Fighting	Tenchi wo Kurau 2: Sekiheki no Tatakai	Software kit	2074

==== United States ====
In the United States, NBA Jam was the highest-grossing arcade game of 1993, followed by Mortal Kombat; both games exceeded the $300,000,000 (equivalent to $670,000,000 in 2025) domestic box office gross of Jurassic Park that year.

The following titles were the highest-grossing arcade video games of the year, according to the Amusement & Music Operators Association (AMOA) and American Amusement Machine Association (AAMA).

Rank	AMOA		AMAA		Play Meter
Rank	Dedicated cabinet	Arcade conversion kit	Title	Award	Play Meter
1	NBA Jam	Mortal Kombat	Mortal Kombat, Mortal Kombat II, NBA Jam, Neo Geo MVS	Diamond	NBA Jam
2	Street Fighter II, Lethal Enforcers, Mortal Kombat, Virtua Racing	Street Fighter II: Champion Edition, Time Killers, X-Men, World Heroes	Mortal Kombat, Mortal Kombat II, NBA Jam, Neo Geo MVS	Diamond	Unknown
3	Street Fighter II, Lethal Enforcers, Mortal Kombat, Virtua Racing	Street Fighter II: Champion Edition, Time Killers, X-Men, World Heroes	Mortal Kombat, Mortal Kombat II, NBA Jam, Neo Geo MVS	Diamond	Unknown
4	Street Fighter II, Lethal Enforcers, Mortal Kombat, Virtua Racing	Street Fighter II: Champion Edition, Time Killers, X-Men, World Heroes	Mortal Kombat, Mortal Kombat II, NBA Jam, Neo Geo MVS	Diamond	Unknown
5	Street Fighter II, Lethal Enforcers, Mortal Kombat, Virtua Racing	Street Fighter II: Champion Edition, Time Killers, X-Men, World Heroes	Virtua Racing	Platinum	Unknown
6	Unknown		OutRunners, Time Killers	Gold	Unknown
7	Unknown		OutRunners, Time Killers	Gold	Unknown
8	Unknown		Crime Patrol, Mad Dog II: The Lost Gold	Silver	Unknown
9	Unknown		Crime Patrol, Mad Dog II: The Lost Gold	Silver	Unknown

=== Best-selling home systems ===
==== Consoles ====
Rank	Manufacturer	Game console	Type	Generation	Sales				
Rank	Manufacturer	Game console	Type	Generation	Japan	USA	Europe	Korea	Worldwide
1	Nintendo	Super NES	Home	16-bit	17,700,000	23,350,000	1,661,000	60,000	49,100,000+
2	Sega	Mega Drive / Genesis	Home	16-bit	9,000,000	19,000,000	2,260,000	24,000	30,750,000+
3	Nintendo	Game Boy	Handheld	8-bit	1,590,000	1,500,000+	625,000+	Unknown	3,715,000+
4	Sega	Game Gear	Handheld	8-bit	400,000	1,500,000	383,000+	Unknown	2,283,000+
5	Sega	Sega CD / Mega-CD	Home	16-bit	100,000	800,000	264,000	Unknown	1,164,000+
6	Nintendo	NES / Famicom	Home	8-bit	540,000	Unknown	555,000	50,000	1,145,000+
7	Sega	Master System	Home	8-bit	—N/a	—N/a	700,000	80,000	780,000+
8	NEC	PC Engine	Home	16-bit	400,000	Unknown	Unknown	Unknown	400,000+
9	Fujitsu	FM Towns Marty	Home	32-bit	45,000	—N/a	—N/a	—N/a	45,000
10	Panasonic	3DO	Home	32-bit	—N/a	40,000+	—N/a	—N/a	40,000+

==== Computers ====
Rank	Manufacturer	Computer architecture	Sales	
Rank	Manufacturer	Computer architecture	Japan	Worldwide
1	Apple Inc.	Apple Macintosh	—N/a	3,300,000
2	IBM	IBM PC	—N/a	2,075,000
3	Compaq Computer	IBM PC compatible	—N/a	1,418,000
4	NEC	NEC PC-98	1,200,000	1,200,000+
5	Packard Bell	IBM PC compatible	—N/a	997,000
6	Dell	IBM PC compatible	—N/a	795,000
7	Gateway 2000	IBM PC compatible	—N/a	644,000
8	AST Research	IBM PC compatible	—N/a	530,000
9	Tandy Corporation	IBM PC compatible	—N/a	350,000
10	Toshiba	IBM PC compatible	—N/a	316,000

=== Best-selling home video games ===
The following titles were the top ten best-selling home video games (console games or computer games) of 1993 with known sales figures.

Rank	Title	Platform	Publisher	Genre	Sales		
Rank	Title	Platform	Publisher	Genre	Japan	UK	Worldwide
1	Street Fighter II	Multi-platform	Capcom	Fighting	1,314,000+	Unknown	5,000,000
2	Mortal Kombat	Multi-platform	Acclaim	Fighting	Unknown	400,000+	3,000,000+
3	Star Fox	Super NES	Nintendo	Rail shooter	325,000	Unknown	1,700,000+
4	Disney's Aladdin	Multi-platform	Virgin	Platformer	Unknown	Unknown	1,600,000+
5	Dragon Ball Z: Super Butōden	Super NES	Bandai	Fighting	1,300,000+	—N/a	1,300,000+
6	Seiken Densetsu 2 (Secret of Mana)	Super NES	Squaresoft	Action RPG	1,002,000	—N/a	1,002,000+
7	Super Mario Collection (All-Stars)	Super NES	Nintendo	Platformer	877,000	Unknown	877,000+
8	Romancing SaGa 2	Super Famicom	Squaresoft	RPG	823,000	—N/a	823,000
9	Dragon Ball Z: Super Butōden 2	Super Famicom	Bandai	Fighting	740,000	—N/a	740,000
10	Super Mario Kart	Super NES	Nintendo	Kart racing	450,000	250,000+	700,000+

==== Japan ====
In Japan, the following titles were the top ten best-selling home video games of 1993.

Rank	Title	Developer	Platform	Publisher	Genre	Sales	Ref
1	Street Fighter II Turbo	Capcom	Super Famicom	Capcom	Fighting	1,314,000	
2	Dragon Ball Z: Super Butōden	TOSE	Super Famicom	Bandai	Fighting	1,300,000+	
3	Seiken Densetsu 2 (Secret of Mana)	Squaresoft	Super Famicom	Squaresoft	Action RPG	1,002,000	
4	Super Mario Collection (Super Mario All-Stars)	Nintendo EAD	Super Famicom	Nintendo	Platformer	877,000	
5	Romancing SaGa 2	Squaresoft	Super Famicom	Squaresoft	RPG	823,000	
6	Dragon Ball Z: Super Butōden 2	TOSE	Super Famicom	Bandai	Fighting	740,000	
7	J. League Soccer Prime Goal	Namco	Super Famicom	Namco	Sports	610,000	
8	Dragon Quest I & II	Chunsoft	Super Famicom	Enix	RPG	567,000	
9	Torneko no Daibōken: Fushigi no Dungeon	Chunsoft	Super Famicom	Chunsoft	Roguelike	510,000	
10	Super Bomberman	Produce!	Super Famicom	Hudson Soft	Maze	497,000	

==== Europe ====
In Europe, the following titles were the top five best-selling 1993 releases during the first quarter of the year.

Rank	Title	Platform	Developer(s)	Publisher	Genre
1	Super Mario Kart	Super Nintendo Entertainment System	Nintendo EAD	Nintendo	Kart racing
2	Sonic the Hedgehog 2	Mega Drive	Sega Technical Institute	Sega	Platformer
3	Streets of Rage II	Mega Drive	Sega, Ancient	Sega	Beat 'em up
4	Road Rash II	Mega Drive	Electronic Arts	Electronic Arts	Racing
5	Mario Paint	Super Nintendo Entertainment System	Nintendo R&D1, Intelligent Systems	Nintendo	Art tool

In the United Kingdom, the following titles were the top ten best-selling home video games of 1993.

Rank	Title	Platform(s)	Publisher(s)	Genre	Sales
1	Mortal Kombat	Game consoles	Acclaim Entertainment	Fighting	400,000+
2	Sonic the Hedgehog 2	Mega Drive	Sega	Platformer	400,000+
3	Lemmings	Multi-platform	Various	Strategy	400,000+
4	Super Kick Off	Game consoles	Various	Sports	400,000+
5	FIFA International Soccer	Mega Drive	Electronic Arts	Sports	400,000
6	Ecco the Dolphin	Mega Drive	Sega	Action-adventure	250,000+
7	Super Mario Kart	Super NES	Nintendo	Kart racing	250,000+
8	Jurassic Park	Multi-platform	Ocean Software	Action	250,000+
9	Jungle Strike	Game consoles	Electronic Arts	Shoot 'em up	250,000
10	PGA Tour Golf II	Mega Drive	Electronic Arts	Sports	200,000

==== United States ====
In the United States, the following titles were the top two highest-grossing home video game franchises in 1993.

Franchise	Publisher	Revenue	Inflation
Mario	Nintendo	$700,000,000	$1.11×10^{9}
Sonic the Hedgehog	Sega	$500,000,000	$1.11×10^{9}

The following titles were the best-selling home video games of each month for video game consoles (home consoles and handheld consoles) in 1993, according to Babbage's (reported by Electronic Gaming Monthly and Electronic Games), Mega (for the Sega Genesis in January), and The NPD Group (for the Super NES and Genesis in July).

Month	NES	Super NES	Sega Genesis	Sega CD	Game Boy	Game Gear	Ref
January	Tecmo Super Bowl	Street Fighter II	Sonic the Hedgehog 2	Cobra Command	Super Mario Land 2	Sonic the Hedgehog 2	
February	Tecmo Super Bowl	John Madden Football '93	Sonic the Hedgehog 2	Cobra Command	Super Mario Land 2	Columns	
March	Tecmo NBA Basketball	Star Fox	Street Fighter II': Special Champion Edition	Jaguar XJ220	Super Mario Land 2	Columns	
April	Tecmo NBA Basketball	Star Fox	Street Fighter II': Special Champion Edition	Jaguar XJ220	Super Mario Land 2	Streets of Rage	
May	Tecmo NBA Basketball	Star Fox	Street Fighter II': Special Champion Edition	X-Men	Super Mario Land 2	Streets of Rage	
June	Kirby's Adventure	Star Fox	Street Fighter II': Special Champion Edition	X-Men	Yoshi's Cookie	Batman Returns	
July	Kirby's Adventure	Star Fox	Street Fighter II': Special Champion Edition	X-Men	Yoshi's Cookie	Batman Returns	
August	Jurassic Park	Star Fox	Jurassic Park	Ecco the Dolphin	Yoshi's Cookie	Batman Returns	
September	Jurassic Park	Star Fox	Mortal Kombat	Ecco the Dolphin	Yoshi's Cookie	Mortal Kombat	
October	Tetris 2	Jurassic Park	Mortal Kombat	Ecco the Dolphin	Wave Race	Mortal Kombat	
November	Tetris 2	The Lost Vikings	Sonic Spinball	Lethal Enforcers	Kirby's Pinball Land	Mortal Kombat	
December	Tetris 2	Super Bomberman	Sonic Spinball	Sonic CD	The Legend of Zelda: Link's Awakening	Mortal Kombat	

The following titles were the year's top six best-selling PC games on CD-ROM format in the United States.

Rank	Title	Publisher	Genre
1	The 7th Guest	Virgin Interactive	Interactive movie
2	Star Wars: Rebel Assault	LucasArts	Rail shooter
3	King's Quest VI	Sierra On-Line	Adventure
4	Return to Zork	Activision	Adventure
5	Just Grandma & Me	Broderbund	Adventure
6	Dracula Unleashed	Viacom New Media	Adventure

== Events ==
- March – In Sweden, the Swedish video game magazine Super Play (SP) starts. The original name is Super Power.
- April 27 – The book Game Over by David Sheff, devoted to the history of Nintendo, is published by Random House.
- May 11 – The first FuncoLand location in McHenry County, Illinois opens in Crystal Lake, bringing the chain's total number of locations to 62.
- May 24 – Sega of America introduces the first ever video game content rating system, the Videogame Rating Council.
- August 4 – FuncoLand parent company Funco Inc leases space for new locations in six shopping centers in the New York City area.
- October – Edge is a multi-format video game magazine published by Future plc, which began publication.
- October 1 – Nintendo and Silicon Graphics collaborate and begin work on "Project Reality".
- December 7 – The first of two congressional hearings on video games takes place. Topics for discussion include the depiction of violence and sexual content in video games, their influence on children, and the prospect of governmental regulation for video game content.

== Business ==
- New companies: Croteam, nVidia, Take-Two Interactive, Shiny
- Defunct companies: DK'Tronics, Epyx
- Magnavox is acquired by the Carlyle Group
- MicroProse is acquired by Spectrum HoloByte

== Notable releases ==
=== Arcade ===
Date	Title	Dev. / Pub.	Notes
July	Samurai Shodown	SNK	'93 Game Of The Year voted on by Electronic Gaming Monthly.
August	Daytona USA	Sega	One of the most impactful racing games of all time.
October	Virtua Fighter	Sega	The first fully polygonal fighting game and a major influence on subsequent 3D fighting games.
October	Ridge Racer	Namco	
November	Mortal Kombat II	Midway	Overshadowed the critical and commercial success of the original Mortal Kombat, becoming one of the most well-known fighting games of all time.
December	NBA Jam	Midway	Being one of the first sports games with official licensed teams and players, it became a cult classic. It was also the highest-earning arcade game of all time in the sports genre.

=== Home ===
Date	Title	Dev. / Pub.	Platform	Notes
February	X-Wing	LucasArts	MS-DOS	
February 21	Star Fox	Nintendo	SNES	The first game to use the Super FX chip and is widely acclaimed as a classic in the rail shooter genre with one of the greatest video game soundtracks ever made.
March 23	Kirby's Adventure	Nintendo	NES	Introduced Kirby's ability to take on the powers of enemies he has eaten, which would go on to become a staple of the franchise.
April 1	The 7th Guest	Virgin Interactive	MS-DOS	Sold over two million copies and was widely regarded as one of three "killer apps" that accelerated the "multimedia revolution" (the other two being Myst & Doom).
April	Strike Commander	Origin Systems	MS-DOS	Pioneer on implementing 3D polygons and texture-mapping in a flight simulation game by Chris Roberts, creator of the Wing Commander series and the notoriously crowdfunded Star Citizen.
June	Dalek Attack	Alternative Software	ZX Spectrum	The last full price game released for the platform by a mainstream publisher.
June 6	The Legend of Zelda: Link's Awakening	Nintendo	Game Boy	
June 6	Syndicate	Electronic Arts	MS-DOS	
June 25	Day of the Tentacle	LucasArts	MS-DOS	
July 14	Super Mario All-Stars	Nintendo	SNES	Featured upgraded 16-bit versions of the first four Super Mario games.
August	Return to Zork	Activision	MS-DOS	
September 6	Master of Orion	MicroProse	MS-DOS	
September 19	Torneko's Great Adventure: Mystery Dungeon	Chunsoft	SFC	
September 23	Sonic CD	Sega	Sega CD	
September 24	Myst	Cyan / Broderbund	MAC OS	The best selling PC title until 2002, with 6 million units sold. Widely regarded as one of three "killer apps" that accelerated the sales of CD-ROM drives (the other two being The 7th Guest & Doom).
October	Frontier: Elite II	David Braben	MS-DOS	Sequel to pioneer space flight simulation game Elite. First video game to employ procedurally generated star systems.
November	Sam & Max Hit the Road	LucasArts	MS-DOS	
November 11	Disney's Aladdin	Virgin Interactive	Genesis	Crowned "Genesis Game of The Year" at the Electronic Gaming Awards (aka the Arcade Awards aka the Arkies) voted on by the public.
December 10	Doom	Id Software	MS-DOS	Widely considered to be one of the greatest and most influential games of all time, especially in the first-person shooter genre.
December 17	Gabriel Knight: Sins of the Fathers	Sierra On-Line	MS-DOS	
December 17	Mega Man X	Capcom	SNES	
December 17	Phantasy Star IV: The End of the Millennium	Sega	Genesis	

=== Hardware ===
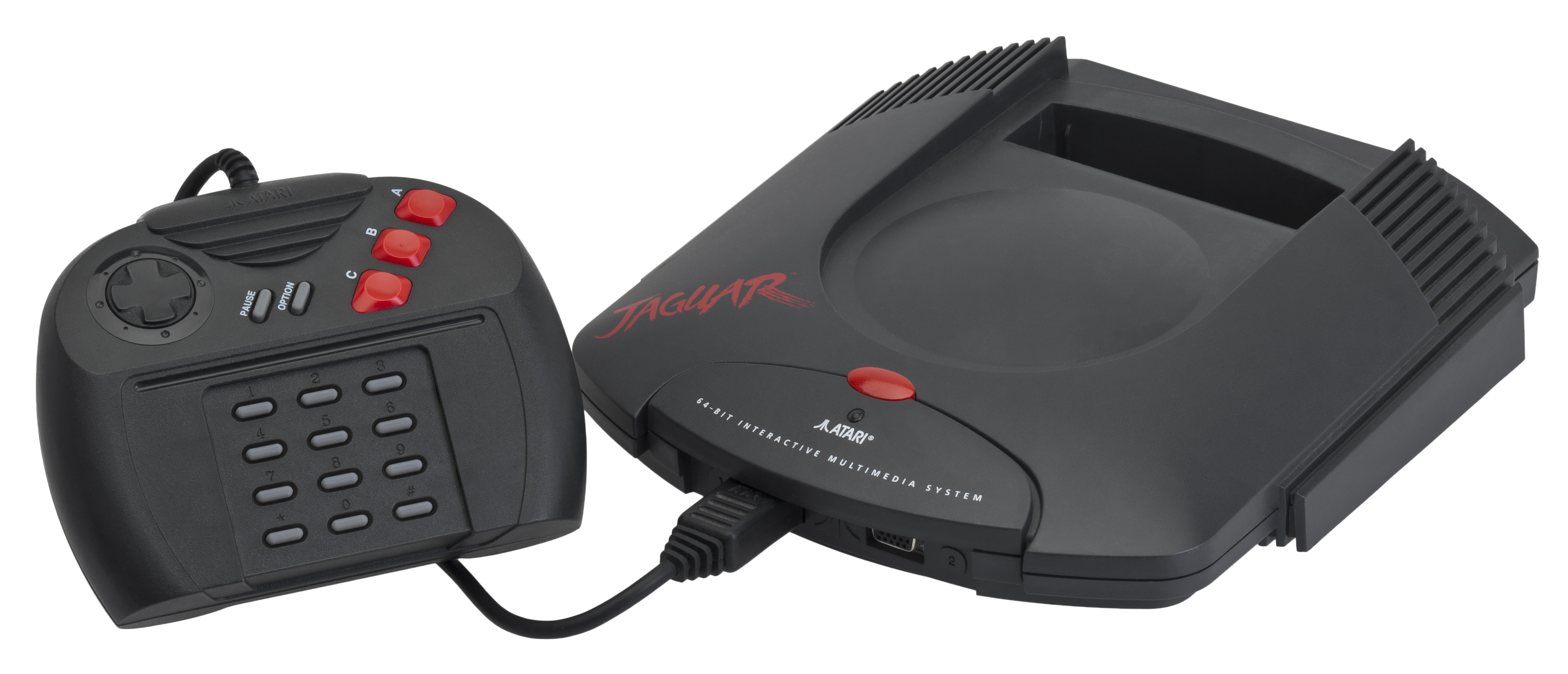
Atari Jaguar

- Sega releases the Model 2, an arcade system board that introduces 3D texture filtering. It becomes their most popular arcade system board.
- Fujitsu releases the FM Towns Marty in Japan, as the first 32-bit home console, starting the fifth console generation.
- Panasonic, GoldStar and Sanyo release the first versions of the 3DO 32-bit console
- Atari Corporation releases the Jaguar home console, calling it the first 64-bit video game system.
- Commodore Business Machines releases the Amiga CD32 multimedia home console.
- Nintendo releases a smaller redesigned NES, which allows cartridges to be inserted at the top of the console, instead of the front.
- Pioneer releases the LaserActive multimedia home console
- Sega's Mega-CD released in Europe and Australia.

== See also ==
- 1993 in games
