= Strategy game =

Type of game

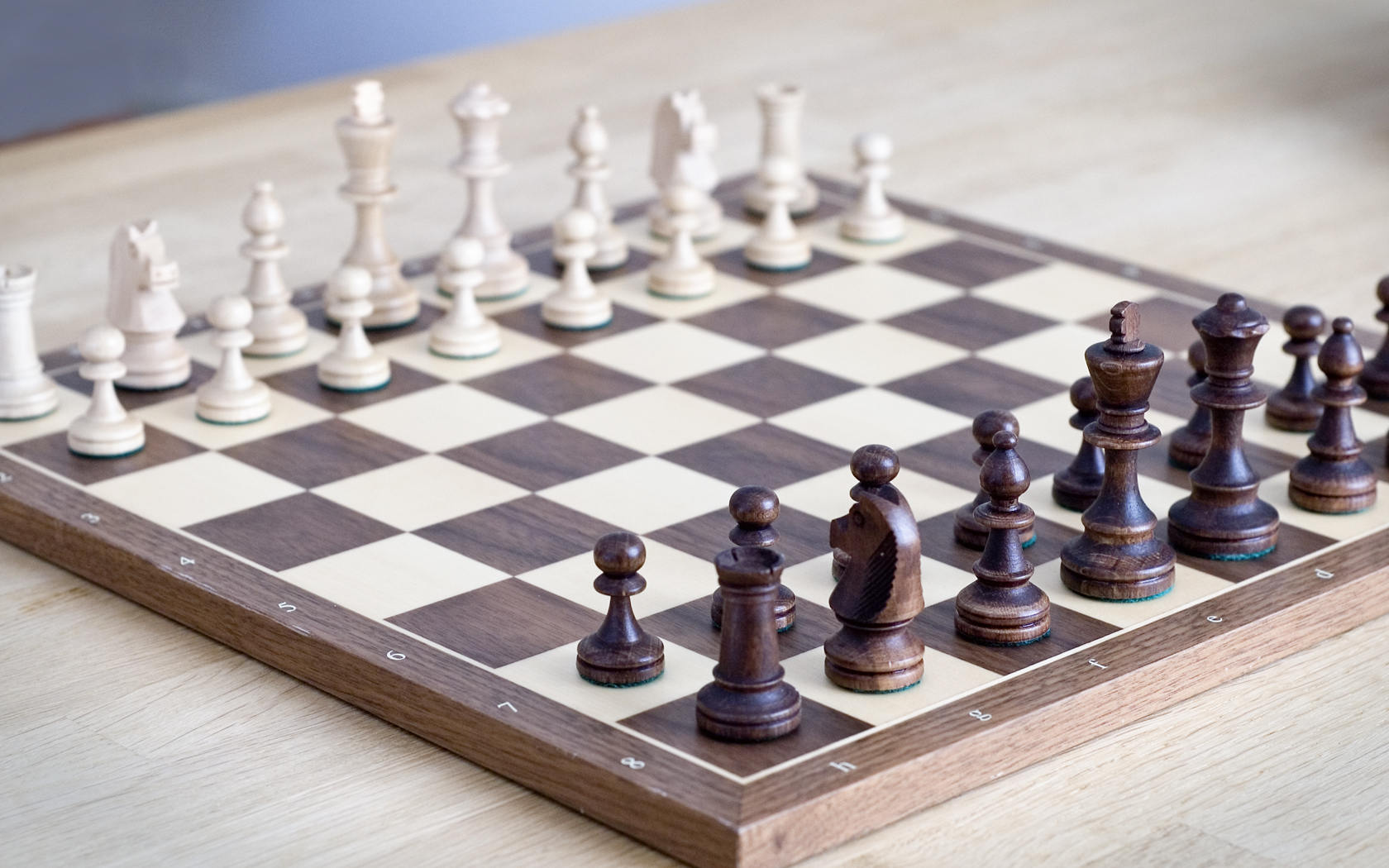
Chess is one of the most well-known and frequently played strategy games.

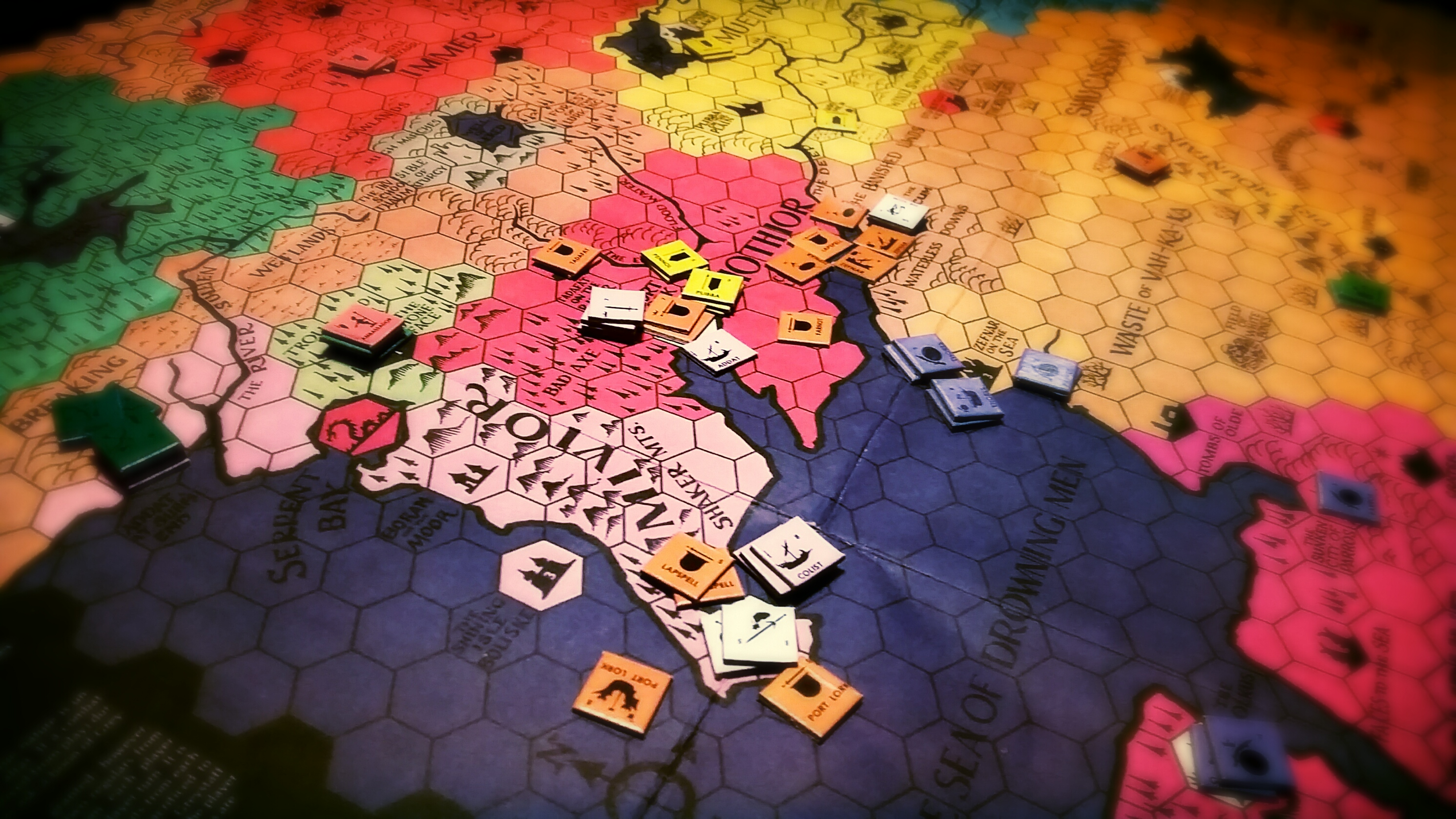
The 1979 strategy wargame Divine Right

A strategy game or strategic game is a game in which the players' uncoerced, and often autonomous, decision-making skills have a high significance in determining the outcome. Almost all strategy games require internal decision tree-style thinking, and typically very high situational awareness.

Strategy games are also seen as a descendant of war games, and define strategy in terms of the context of war, but this is more partial. A strategy game is a game that relies primarily on strategy, and when it comes to defining what strategy is, two factors need to be taken into account: its complexity and game-scale actions, such as each placement in the Total War video game series. The definition of a strategy game in its cultural context should be any game that belongs to a tradition that goes back to war games, contains more strategy than the average video game, contains certain gameplay conventions, and is represented by a particular community. Although war is dominant in strategy games, it is not the whole story.

== History ==
The history of turn-based strategy games goes back to the times of ancient civilizations found in places such as Rome, Greece, Egypt, the Levant, and India. Many were played widely through their regions of origin, but only some are still played today.

According to Thierry Depaulis, oldest strategy games would be the "Greek game of polis (πόλις), which appears in the literature around 450 BCE, and the more or less contemporary Chinese game of weiqi (‘go’), which, under the name of yi (弈), is mentioned in Confucius’s Analects (Lunyu) compiled between ca 470/50 and 280 BCE."

The Royal Game of Ur from c. 2500 BCE which often been called one of the oldest board games, likely had some strategy elements as well, although it is generally seen as a luck-based race game.

One of the earliest strategy games still played is mancala. Due to claims that some artifacts from c. 5000 BCE might be old mancala boards, it has been suggested that mancala may be the oldest known strategy game, but this claim has been disputed.

Another game that has stood the test of time is chess, believed to have originated in India around the sixth century CE. The game spread to the west by trade, but chess gained social status and permanence more strongly than many other games. Chess became a game of skill and tactics often forcing the players to think two or three moves ahead of their opponent just to keep up.

== Types ==
=== Abstract strategy ===
In abstract strategy games, the game is only loosely tied to a thematic concept, if at all. The rules do not attempt to simulate reality, but rather serve the internal logic of the game.

A purist's definition of an abstract strategy game requires that it cannot have random elements or hidden information. This definition includes such games as chess and Go. However, many games are commonly classed as abstract strategy games which do not meet these criteria: games such as backgammon, Octiles, Can't Stop, Sequence and Mentalis have all been described as "abstract strategy" games despite having a chance element. A smaller category of non-perfect abstract strategy games incorporate hidden information without using any random elements; for example, Stratego.

=== Team strategy ===
One of the most focused team strategy games is contract bridge. This card game consists of two teams of two players, whose offensive and defensive skills are continually in flux as the game's dynamic progresses. Some argue that the benefits of playing this team strategy card game extend to those skills and strategies used in business and that the playing of these games helps to automate strategic awareness.

=== Eurogames ===
Eurogames, or German-style boardgames, are a relatively new genre that sit between abstract strategy games and simulation games. They generally have simple rules, short to medium playing times, indirect player interaction and abstract physical components. The games emphasize strategy, play down chance and conflict, lean towards economic rather than military themes, and usually keep all the players in the game until it ends.

=== Simulation ===
This type of game is an attempt to simulate the decisions and processes inherent to some real-world situation. Most of the rules are chosen to reflect what the real-world consequences would be of each player's actions and decisions. Abstract games cannot be completely divided from simulations and so games can be thought of as existing on a continuum of almost pure abstraction (like Abalone) to almost pure simulation (like Diceball! or Strat-o-Matic Baseball).

=== Wargame ===
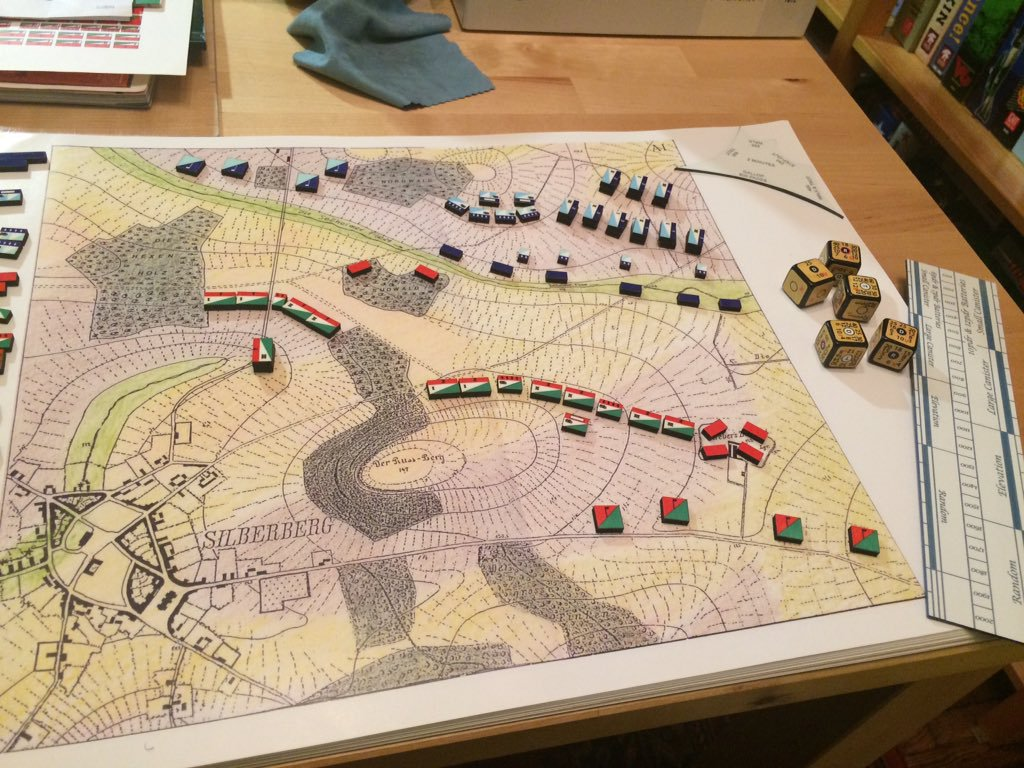
A German military wargame from 1824

Wargames are simulations of military battles, campaigns, or entire wars. Players will have to consider situations that are analogous to the situations faced by leaders of historical battles. As such, wargames are usually heavy on simulation elements, and while they are all "strategy games", they can also be "strategic" or "tactical" in the military jargon sense. Its creator, H. G. Wells, stated how "much better is this amiable miniature [war] than the real thing".

Traditionally, wargames have been played either with miniatures, using physical models of detailed terrain and miniature representations of people and equipment to depict the game state; or on a board, which commonly uses cardboard counters on a hex map.

Popular miniature wargames include Warhammer 40,000 or its fantasy counterpart Warhammer Fantasy. Popular strategic board wargames include Risk, Axis and Allies, Diplomacy, and Paths of Glory. Advanced Squad Leader is a successful tactical scale wargame.

It is instructive to compare the Total War series to the Civilization series, where moving troops to a specific tile is a tactic because there are no short-range decisions. But in Empire: Total War (2009), every encounter between two armies activates a real-time mode in which they must fight and the same movement of troops is treated as a strategy. Throughout the game, the movement of each army is at a macro scale, because the player can control each battle at a micro scale. However, as an experience, the two types of military operations are quite similar and involve similar skills and thought processes. The concept of micro scale and macro scale can well describe the gameplay of a game; however, even very similar games can be difficult to integrate into a common vocabulary. In this definition, strategy does not explicitly describe the player's experience; it is more appropriate to describe different formal game components. The similarity of the actions taken in two different games does not affect our definition of them as strategy or tactics: we will only rely on their scale in their respective games.

=== Strategy video games ===
Strategy video games are categorized based on whether they offer the continuous gameplay of real-time strategy (RTS), or the discrete phases of turn-based strategy (TBS). Often the computer is expected to emulate a strategically thinking "side" similar to that of a human player (such as directing armies and constructing buildings), or emulate the "instinctive" actions of individual units that would be too tedious for a player to administer (such as for a peasant to run away when attacked, as opposed to standing still until otherwise ordered by the player); hence there is an emphasis on artificial intelligence.

== See also ==
- Game of chance
- Game of skill
- Mind sport
