= Gale Banks =

American automotive engineer

Gale Banks (born August 23, 1942) is an American hot rodder, drag racer, engineer, and entrepreneur who grew up in Lynwood, California. His company, Gale Banks Engineering, sells performance parts for automotive and marine engines. It specializes in diesel engines, and high end cutting-edge equipment, performance parts, and auxiliaries. The company has approximately 100+ employees.

== History ==
1958: Gale Banks begins his career as a hot rodder by modifying the engine in his mother's car. He founded "C.P's Auto & Marine Racing Engines" as a way to fund his college expenses at Cal Poly, Pomona.

1966: Banks modifies a 1953 Studebaker and drives it to class records at El Mirage Dry Lake and the Bonneville Salt Flats with a top speed of 184.52 mph, as certified by the Southern California Timing Association.

1970: First Banks-branded turbo marine racing engine is built. Gale Banks Engineering and Banks Power engines win the American Power Boat Association (APBA) & NJBA (National Jet Boat Association) Jet Class national championship.

1974: The Banks/Brunette tunnel boat powered by a 398 cubic inch engine developed by Gale Banks Engineering and Banks Power wins the first of five consecutive APBA Endurance Tunnel Hull national championships.

1976: The "Crucifier", a race boat powered by a Banks fuel-injected nitro HEMI wins every event it enters, including the NDBA (National Drag Boat Association) and APBA nationals.

1978: Gale Banks Engineering is contracted by N.I.S.T.A. in the Department of Transportation to develop the power train for its Large Research Safety Vehicle (L.S.R.V.) program. When finished, it met proposed 1985 fuel and emission standards. This year also saw Banks develop the world's first electronically injected oxygen-sensing turbocharged engine for Volvo.

1981: Banks creates the high performance diesel aftermarket with his first turbocharger system developed for the 6.2 litre GM diesel. Also that year, a Banks-powered 450-hp twin-turbo Buick V-6 becomes the prototype for the Buick Grand National production car.

1982: The "Sundowner" Corvette, powered by a Banks twin-turbo big block, becomes the "World's Fastest Passenger Car" at 240 mph, taking the record away from the "Hanky Panky" Studebaker, which also used a Banks-developed twin-turbo power plant. This year also saw the Banks twin-turbo powered S-1 Express take an APBA world championship.

1984: A street-legal Pontiac Trans Am with 700-hp and a Banks turbo breaks the 200 mph barrier and becomes a cover story for Car & Driver magazine.

1987: A Banks Power twin-turbo, 1800-hp Pontiac GTA sets a new "World's Fastest Passenger Car" speed record at Bonneville Salt Flats at 277 mph as certified by the Southern California Timing Association. This record stood for the next ten years.

1988: Banks turbocharger systems become a GM dealer-specified option.

1992: A Banks Power-developed twin air intake and intercooler system results in a claimed 80-hp improvement on the factory-turbocharged Dodge Cummins engine.

1993: The Banks "Sidewinder" aftermarket turbocharger is introduced. Tests show that turbo-lag times decrease and throttle response improves when compared with factory turbochargers.

1994: Banks begins offering intercoolers to improve the performance of the Ford Power Stroke diesel. At this time, the Ford factory was not using intercoolers on their diesel-powered pickup trucks.

2002: A street-legal Dodge Dakota pick up truck built in the Banks Power shop with a 735-hp, 1300 lb-ft, 5.9 litre Cummins hauls its own trailer to Bonneville and sets the FIA record for "World's Fastest Pickup Truck" with a two-way average of 217 mph and one-way top speed of 222 mph.

2007: The Wes Anderson-driven Banks "Sidewinder" S-10 with a 1250-hp, 6.6 litre Banks Power/Duramax engine becomes the "World's Quickest and Fastest Diesel Drag Truck" with a 7.72 second elapsed time and a top speed of 179+ mph in the quarter-mile, as recorded by the National Hot Rod Diesel Association..

2009: Gale Banks receives a Distinguished Service Citation from the Automotive Hall of Fame

2010: On March 6, 2010, the Banks crew tested out the Top Diesel Dragster's new "Stroker" 427 cu. in., twin-turbo 7.0L Duramax engine at the NHRDA Nationals in Wittmann, Arizona. The Banks Sidewinder S-10 runs at NHRDA in Topeka, Kansas winning top diesel class with 7.77et @ 178 mph.

2011: Gale Banks builds world's first supercharged Top Diesel Dragster. Gale Banks teams up with Paul Dallenbach to race the Pikes Peak International Hill Climb.

2012: Banks and Dallenbach race at Pikes Peak.

2013: Banks and racer/stunt driver Mike Ryan team up to race at Pikes Peak in a Freightliner Cascadia.
