= The Pocket Players' Guide =

Book for Magic: The Gathering

- Publisher: Wizards of the Coast
- Publication date: 1995
- ISBN: 978-0061056239

The Pocket Players' Guide is a book about Magic: The Gathering published by Wizards of the Coast.

== Contents ==
The Pocket Players' Guide is book containing an expanded explanation for the rules of Magic, presenting examples as well as commentary, and a glossary for game terms, with sections on how to develop Magic decks, how to handle multiplayer games, rules for tournaments, and a full guide to every card in the latest edition at the time with notes on any cards already in publication whose function would be altered by the revised rules.

== Reception ==
Andy Butcher reviewed the fourth edition of The Pocket Players' Guide for Arcane magazine, rating it a 9 out of 10 overall. Butcher comments that "For the price of a starter deck, you can't really afford to be without this book, and it serves as a very good example of what a CCG players' guide should be."

== Reviews ==
- Dragon #227
- Casus Belli #81
