= Star Riders =

- Designers: Hans Guévin
- Publishers: Ianus Games
- Publication: 1993
- Genres: Science fiction, comedy
- Systems: custom

Star Riders (ISBN 2-921573-10-5) is a comedy science fiction role-playing game designed by Hans Guévin and published by Ianus Games in 1993.

== Gameplay ==
Star Riders uses the game system developed for Teenagers from Outer Space to parody the genre of space opera.

Star Riders takes place in and near the Dodourunrun Conundrum Empire, an interstellar nation that attempted to simplify space travel by moving the stars of the Known Universe into a more convenient pattern. In doing so, the Empire misplaced the planet Earth, causing great distress among the many young adults (human and alien) who considered Earth the "coolest place in the Known Universe." Player characters in the game are "star riders" who travel the universe attempting to locate the lost Earth.

== Publication history ==
No supplements or accessories were published for Star Riders. An advertisement in the game book stated that a Star Riders comic book series would debut in May 1994, but the only Star Riders comic published was a three-part serial that appeared in the anthology series Dark Horse Presents.

== Reception ==
Perry L. Holley reviewed Star Riders in White Wolf #46 (Aug., 1994), rating it a 3 out of 5 and stated that "If you like TFOS or humorous RPGs in general, Star Raiders is a good addition to your collection. If your gaming tastes tend to be more serious, you're probably better off spending your money elsewhere."
