= Nancy Tellem =

American television executive (born 1952)

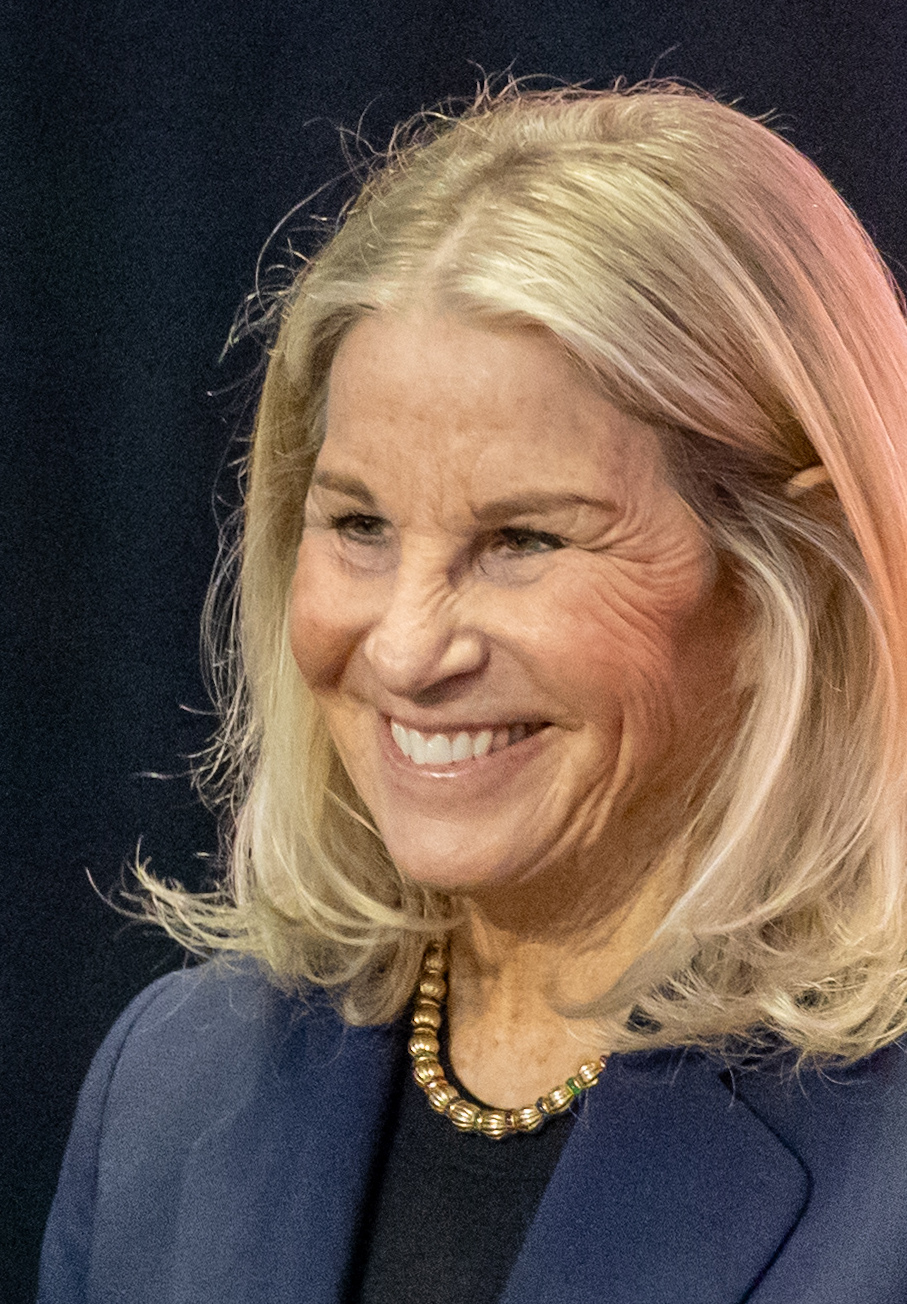
- Tellem in 2025
- Born: December 13, 1952 (age 73); Danville, California, U.S.
- Education: University of California Berkeley; University of California Hastings College of the Law
- Occupation: Entertainment executive
- Spouse: Arn Tellem (m. 1979)
- Children: 3

Nancy Tellem (born December 13, 1952) is an American media executive who is the chief media officer and executive chairwoman of Eko (formerly Interlude), a start-up which has created an online platform. She was formerly the entertainment and digital media president of Microsoft Xbox Entertainment Studios and the president of CBS Network Television Entertainment Group, formerly CBS Entertainment Network and CBS Studios. She is the co-founder of BasBlue, Inc, a nonprofit organization.

== Career ==
Tellem was born to a Jewish family in Danville, California, the daughter of an anesthesiologist mother and orthopedic surgeon father. Her parents were Jewish survivors of the Holocaust. Tellem got hooked on TV as a child through fan magazines that the networks used to mail out during the summer to promote new shows. As an undergraduate at the University of California Berkeley, she interned one summer for Congressman Ron Dellums (D-Calif.) on Capitol Hill and met her future husband, Arn Tellem. After earning a JD from the University of California Hastings College of the Law, she practiced law as a business litigator for five years in Los Angeles. Among her first jobs was chasing down people who claimed to be heirs to Howard Hughes's estate. Tellem then jumped to entertainment, working initially at Columbia Pictures Television on famed lawyer F. Lee Bailey's short-lived 1982 show Lie Detector. Eventually she would end up working for Merv Griffin Enterprises, including on his Wheel of Fortune show before moving to Lorimar Television, where she was in the business affairs department.

=== Warner Bros. and CBS Paramount ===
When Lorimar merged with Warner Bros. television, Leslie Moonves became head of Warner Bros Television. In 1987, he promoted Tellem to Executive Vice President for Business and Financial Affairs and was part of the team that created the landmark shows Friends and ER. When Moonves became head of CBS Entertainment in 1995, two years later, he appointed Tellem the network's Executive Vice President of Business Affairs and President of CBS Productions, the unit responsible for producing original series for the network.

In 1998, Moonves became the president of CBS, and named Tellem his successor. That year Tellem ascended to the presidency of CBS Network Television Entertainment Group, where she oversaw programming, development, production, business affairs and network operations for the CBS Entertainment Network and CBS-Paramount Studios. She was responsible for deciding which shows appeared on CBS, supervised the prime-time, daytime, late-night and Saturday morning lineup on both CBS and later, The CW Television Network - the merged network of The WB and UPN - including shows like CSI, Survivor, Everybody Loves Raymond, The King of Queens, and Gossip Girl. In 2010, she stepped down as president, and took on a new role as a senior advisor to Moonves.

Tellem was the second woman in television history, after ABC's Jamie Tarses, to hold the top entertainment post at a major broadcast network. In 2003, she was named the third most powerful woman in entertainment by The Hollywood Reporter. From 2006 through 2008, Forbes magazine ranked Tellem 75th, 49th and 32nd, respectively, on its annual list of the 100 Most Powerful Women. She placed third on Entertainment Weekly's 2008 list of the 25 smartest people in TV for restoring CBS's entire prime-time line-up quickly after the 100-day writers’ strike.

=== Microsoft ===
In June 2012, reports surfaced that Microsoft was looking to hire Tellem to head the software giant's entertainment division, which included the company's Xbox and Xbox Live products. In September 2012, Tellem joined the company as entertainment and digital media president, and set about putting together a team to develop entertainment content that would be available exclusively through the Xbox platform. She left the company when the studio shut down in October 2014.

=== Eko ===
In April 2015, Tellem became executive chairman and chief media officer of Interlude, a technology company and creator of proprietary technology used in interactive storytelling. Interlude is now known as Eko. Tellem is also an investor in the company, and one of its board of directors.

=== BasBlue ===
In 2015, Tellem launched BasBlue, Inc. a nonprofit organization providing access, programming, mentorship and education to underrepresented and under-resourced women and non-binary individuals.

== Awards and honors ==
In 2006, Tellem was inducted into the Broadcasting & Cable Hall of Fame, in recognition of her contributions to the electronic arts. Two years later she received a National Association of Television Program Executives' Brandon Tartikoff Legacy Award, which recognizes television professionals who exhibit extraordinary passion, leadership, independence and vision in the process of creating TV programming.

== Personal life ==
Tellem is married to former sports agent Arn Tellem, the vice chairman of Palace Sports & Entertainment, which owns the Detroit Pistons. The couple has three sons: Michael, Matthew and Eric.
