= Ethan Allen (baseball) =

American baseball player (1904–1993)

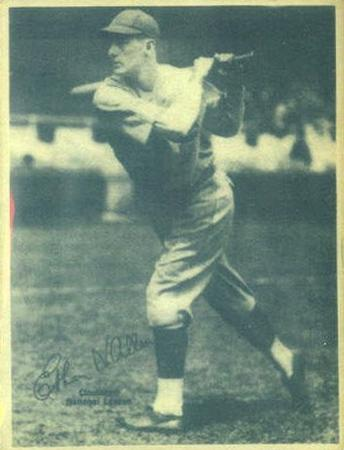
- Outfielder
- Born: January 1, 1904; Cincinnati, Ohio, U.S.
- Died: September 15, 1993 (aged 89); Brookings, Oregon, U.S.
- Batted: Right Threw: Right

MLB debut
- June 21, 1926, for the Cincinnati Reds

Last MLB appearance
- June 18, 1938, for the St. Louis Browns

MLB statistics
- Batting average: .300
- Home runs: 47
- Runs batted in: 501
- Stats at Baseball Reference

Teams
- Cincinnati Reds (1926–1930); New York Giants (1930–1932); St. Louis Cardinals (1933); Philadelphia Phillies (1934–1936); Chicago Cubs (1936); St. Louis Browns (1937–1938)

Ethan Nathan Allen (January 1, 1904 – September 15, 1993) was an American center fielder in Major League Baseball from 1926 to 1938. He played for the Cincinnati Reds (1926–30), New York Giants (1930–32), St. Louis Cardinals (1932–33), Philadelphia Phillies (1934–36), Chicago Cubs (1936), and St. Louis Browns (1936–38).

== Early life ==
Born in Cincinnati Allen went to Withrow High School and is an alumnus of the University of Cincinnati. During his time at UC, Allen was a star athlete in track and field, basketball, and baseball. He was also a member of Beta Theta Pi.

== Playing career ==
In 1,123 games he compiled 1,325 hits and 47 home runs with 501 RBI, with a batting average of .300, on-base percentage of .336 and slugging average of .410. In 1935, he finished 17th in MVP voting with a batting average of .307 and a league-leading 156 games played. He hit .300 or better six times in his career. Defensively, Allen posted a .981 fielding percentage at all three outfield positions in his career.

== Coaching career ==
Allen later became the baseball coach at Yale University, serving from 1946 to 1968. Allen reached the College World Series finals in 1947 and 1948. His players included future President George H. W. Bush.

== Legacy ==
Allen remained well-known long after his retirement as a player as the inventor of the Cadaco-Ellis board game All Star Baseball, which entered production in the early 1940s and remains available into the 21st century, with few changes having been made.

Allen died at age 89 in Brookings, Oregon.

== See also ==
- List of Major League Baseball annual doubles leaders
- List of baseball players who went directly to Major League Baseball
