= All Star Baseball =

Board game

All Star Baseball is a 1941 baseball board game designed by baseball player Ethan Allen. The game, manufactured by Cadaco-Ellis, was the best-selling baseball board game of all time. It has been honored as one of the fifty most influential American board games of all time.

== History ==
Ethan Allen had formulated the idea for a baseball-themed board game while playing for the Chicago Cubs, and brought the idea to Charles Mazer, head of Cadaco-Ellis. The first edition of All Star Baseball was released in 1941 and sold for $1.25.

Unlike more simulation-focused competitors, most notably Strat-O-Matic Baseball, ASB is aimed at a younger audience and is simpler to play. The initial target audience was boys 9–12 years old. It simulates batters' performance well, but makes no attempt to model the performance of individual pitchers.

It was the only such game to have been distributed through mass market channels and toy stores for any extended period of time. The annual versions of the game were discontinued in the mid-1990s due to the loss of market share to video games and increased player licensing costs, but a commemorative version was issued in 2003.

Nevertheless, a number of fans bought each year's cards and collected statistics from neighborhood leagues, some amassing as many as 2,500 games worth of paper box scores and comparing those totals with the actual players' statistics.

== Game play ==
The game board for ASB has two spinners on top of a diagram of a baseball field. A hole for a baserunner peg is cut at the location of each base. A cardboard back panel is inserted into cut-out slots in the board, displays the key to the game cards and cardboard wheels that can be turned to display the correct inning, the number of outs and the score.

Each circular player card has a series of lines and numbers arranged in a circle around its center. The card is placed on a spinner, which the batting player spins. (Aficionados would spin the metal pointers with rubber bands to avoid blisters.) Once the spinner came to rest between two lines, the number for that section defined what happened to that batter.

If one or more runners were on base, the pitching player would spin the other spinner, which displayed zones that defined whether runners advanced, scored or were out on the play.

Some special plays, as well as attempted steals, required the use of two special pink situation cards, which went on the pitching player's spinner and indicated the result when spun.

There were no pitching cards nor fielding cards, although pitchers' batting statistics were present on their cards. This made the game inherently less mathematically accurate than its older-audience rivals.

The chart for the meaning of each number on the cards is below. The earliest versions of ASB utilized this list:

- 1 Home Run
- 2 Ground out, double play with runner on first base
- 3 Runner reaches base on error
- 4 Fly out, all runners advance
- 5 Triple
- 6 Ground out, all runners advance
- 7 Single, runners advance one base
- 8 Fly out, runner on third base scores, others hold
- 9 Walk (Base on balls)
- 10 Strikeout
- 11 Double
- 12 Ground out, runners advance if forced
- 13 Single, runners advance two bases
- 14 Fly out, runners hold their bases

Later versions featured a simpler chart, augmented by second spins on the fielding player's side (presumably to give that player more to do), with only the "3" section fundamentally changed:

- 1 Home Run
- 2 Ground out
- 3 Fly out (Formerly Safe on error)
- 4 Fly out
- 5 Triple
- 6 Ground out
- 7 Single
- 8 Fly out
- 9 Walk (Base on balls)
- 10 Strikeout
- 11 Double
- 12 Ground out
- 13 Single
- 14 Fly out

For the 1975 release, the batting chart was reduced to the eight possible results:

- 1 Home Run
- 2 Triple
- 3 Double
- 4 Single
- 5 Fly Out
- 6 Ground Out
- 7 Base on Balls
- 8 Strikeout

All other rules of the game match those of regular baseball.

== Players ==
Until about 1980 ASB had a mix of current Major League stars and Hall of Fame players. As more athletes (and their estates) asserted licensing rights over the use of their names the old-time players were dropped from the game, although a handful of individuals were included occasionally in an annual set.

Each of the then current players were asked to sign off on a release form granting permission to include their batting statistics in the game. This practice continued for almost 50 years after the introduction of the game. Although a few declined, most agreed despite the fact that they were not compensated for being included.

In 1995 the game came under the MLBPA license, which made the design of the game cards more sophisticated but also added significantly to the cost of production. Since the change in its business model to absorb the MLBPA royalties Cadaco has stopped issuing regular annual updates to the game, and its publishing future remains unclear.

Although numbers have varied, the typical ASB boxed set contained 40 player cards for early sets, and 63 player cards for later sets.

== Cards ==
During most of its history ASB has had annual updates of its boxed board game with new players and updated stats. During some eras Cadaco-Ellis has also sold older cards by mail, and in recent years the cards have become popular on eBay.

As part of the special 2003 commemorative version, Cadaco also issued separate individually packaged sets of player cards for an All-Star Player Pack, the 2003 Ultimate Series (New York Yankees vs. Florida Marlins) and the 2003 Fantasy Series (Boston Red Sox vs. Chicago Cubs). These held action photos to further identify them as being collectible baseball cards.

There is a significant collectors market for older cards, which are broken down into several eras (all years are approximate) as printing technology evolved:

- 1941-1958—Black and white cards printed on heavy cardboard, with die-cut center opening so the card can be put on a cardboard block to hold it steady beneath the spinner on the game board. Most if not all years' cards in this era have solid dark green backs.
- 1959-1962—Old time players' cards are printed in red instead of black. The cardboard is lighter weight.
- 1962-1967—Current players are on multicolored cards with blue-gray backgrounds and with key colors indicating American or National League. Old time players' cards have red backgrounds. Wooden baserunner pegs were also replaced with plastic pegs at this time.
- 1968-1988—The game board is redesigned and the cardboard block to hold the cards beneath the spinner is replaced with a plastic holder on which the spinner rests; the card is inserted in the top of the holder and is centered beneath the spinner. This eliminated the need for the die-cut hole in the middle of the card, making them less likely to tear. Some die-hard players, accustomed to holding the cards through the center hole, manually cut holes in the new cards.
- 1989-1991, 1993, 2003-2004—Player photographs are added to the cards, in part to try to increase their collector value.

== Variants ==
The published 1941 game was considered only a first draft. In 1975, Cadaco did try a version with 8 categories instead of 14, but the cards were already collected by dedicated players and the re-design was abandoned by Cadaco. Despite the increases in complexity, the game was intended for boys, not adults.
