= Arn Tellem =

American sports agent

- Born: February 21, 1954 (age 72); Philadelphia, Pennsylvania, U.S.
- Education: Haverford College; University of Michigan
- Occupations: Sports team executive, sports agent
- Spouse: Nancy Tellem (1979–present)
- Children: Michael, Matty, Eric

Arn Herschel Tellem (born February 21, 1954) is an American sports executive who is the vice chairman of the Detroit Pistons of the National Basketball Association (NBA). From 1981 to 2015, he was a sports agent best known for his representation of basketball and baseball players. Tellem was vice chairman of the Wasserman Media Group, a global sport and entertainment marketing agency headed by Casey Wasserman. From 2009 to 2010, he wrote a semi-weekly sports column for The Huffington Post. He has also written for Sports Illustrated, the op-ed page of The New York Times, Grantland, Detroit Free Press, The Hollywood Reporter, The Japan Times and The Detroit News.

== Background ==
Tellem was born to a Jewish family and is a native of Philadelphia. His mother named him after a brave knight in the Prince Valiant comic strip. He grew up on the Main Line and became a sports junkie at age eight by playing APBA Baseball, a mail-order board game. Years later, for luck on his wedding night, he propped his treasured 1938 Hank Greenberg APBA card on the nightstand next to the conjugal bed. At 12, he found career inspiration from legendary Temple University basketball coach Harry Litwack, who answered a question -- "What's your favorite food?"—that young Arn had phoned in to a local radio station.

He graduated from Haverford College in 1976 and from the University of Michigan Law School in 1979. He began his career as an attorney in the law firm then known as Manatt, Phelps, Rothenberg & Tunney, where his mentors were sports attorneys Alan Rothenberg and Stephen Greenberg (son of Hank Greenberg). Tellem specialized in sports law and commercial litigation and became a partner in the firm. He began representing baseball players and also served six seasons (1982–1989) as general counsel of the San Diego Clippers, and was instrumental in the franchise's move to Los Angeles in 1984.

In 1989, he launched his own sports agency, Tellem and Associates. In 1999, SFX Entertainment purchased the agency and later named Tellem chief executive of SFX Sports. In 2006, Wasserman Media Group acquired his NBA and Major League Baseball (MLB) player representation practices. Tellem became the President of WMG Management as part of the deal. He brought along a client base of about 50 NBA and 50 MLB clients, including Tracy McGrady, Jermaine O'Neal, Pau Gasol, Jason Giambi, Hideki Matsui, Nomar Garciaparra and Mike Mussina.

Tellem is certified as an agent by the Major League Baseball Players Association and the National Basketball Players Association, and is a member of the American Bar Association and the State Bar of California. He was an adjunct professor of law at the University of Southern California School of Law, and is on the board of directors of Peace Players International and Seeds of Peace, organizations that bring together kids from conflict regions around the world to promote tolerance and understanding among the youth in those hot spots.

== Career as sports agent ==
As a player agent, Tellem negotiated numerous high-profile contracts for NBA and MLB players. He oversaw WMG's athlete representation businesses and was involved in the strategic direction of the company.

In 2006, Sports Business Journal named Tellem the Most Influential Agent in Sports and The Sporting News named Tellem "Most Influential Sports Agent." In 2004 and 2005, Tellem was the only NBA player agent named to The Sporting News "50 Most Influential People in Sports Business" and was recognized as the industry's top agent by the magazine in 2003, 2004, 2005 and 2006. In 2008, Sports Business Journal ranked him second among sports agents. Two years later Business Insider named Tellem one of the world's four "best" sports agents. In 2013, Forbes ranked Tellem the third most powerful agent in sports; and first in basketball.

=== Baseball ===
In 1981, Tellem signed his first athlete, pitcher Mark Langston. The following year he helped reliever Ed Farmer beat the Chicago White Sox in a landmark salary arbitration case. After Langston turned free agent in 1989, Tellem engineered a record five-year, $16 million deal with the California Angels. In 1994, he convinced the Angels to sign journeyman Rex Hudler for the league minimum, inserting an innovative incentive clause into the contract: $1,000 for every plate appearance. In 1995, he found the "voluntary retirement" loophole in Hideo Nomo's contract that allowed the veteran pitcher to leave Japan and sign with the Los Angeles Dodgers. In 1997, the five-year, $55 million deal Tellem made with the White Sox for Albert Belle changed the salary structure in baseball. When Belle opted out of the contract in 1999, Tellem orchestrated a new five-year deal with the Baltimore Orioles worth $65 million. He also cobbled together contracts of six years and $88.5 million for Mussina in 2001; seven years and $120 million for Giambi in 2002; four years and $52 million for Matsui in 2004; and, in 2007, Chase Utley's seven-year, $85 million arbitration contract with the Philadelphia Phillies. Utley's pact was then the largest and longest ever given to a second baseman, and the most lucrative in Phillies history. In 2012, following an around-the-clock negotiating session, he and the Texas Rangers agreed to a six-year, $60 million deadline deal with Japanese pitcher Yu Darvish.

In December 2011, hedge-fund manager Steven A. Cohen enlisted Tellem as a partner in a bid to buy the Dodgers. In March 2012, a group fronted by Magic Johnson outbid them.

=== Basketball ===
In 1996, Tellem made his mark as an NBA agent by circumventing that year's pro draft to maneuver 18-year-old Kobe Bryant to the Los Angeles Lakers. "Basically, I kept teams from picking Kobe by not giving their coaches access to him," Tellem told Sports Illustrated in 2003. "I knew teams would be reluctant to take a chance on a high schooler without first talking to him and working him out." From 2000 to 2001, he represented 14 of the NBA's first-round draft picks and worked for 13% of the players in the league—42, in all. His basketball roster included Bryant, Reggie Miller, Baron Davis, McGrady, O'Neal and Brent Barry. As of the 2006 NBA draft, Tellem's firm had represented the most first-round draft picks of any sports marketing and management company for seven straight years. Tellem and his team repped four lottery selections and six first-round picks overall. At the 2008 draft, they had six lottery picks and seven of the first 15 players selected, including Russell Westbrook, Danilo Gallinari and Derrick Rose, the No. 1 overall pick. Tellem negotiated contracts of four years and $60 million for Ben Wallace; and maximum salary deals of five years and $67.4 million for Joe Johnson; six years and $86.4 million for Gasol; seven years and $126 million for O'Neal; four years and $50 million for Antawn Jamison; five years and $87.8 million for Brandon Roy; five years and $65 million for LaMarcus Aldridge; five years and $60 million for Al Horford; and seven years and $93 million for McGrady. In 2009, Gasol reupped with the Lakers for three years and $57 million; a year later Tellem hammered out Johnson's six-year, $123.6 million extension with the Atlanta Hawks; and, in 2011, Rose agreed to a new five-year, $94.8 million deal with the Chicago Bulls. When Tellem's client Anthony Davis was picked first overall in the 2012 NBA Draft, the onetime University of Kentucky power forward became the first player selected by an NBA team to play in a full-length season since a 10-year collective bargaining agreement was ratified by the NBA Board of Governors in December 2011.

On April 29, 2013, his NBA client Jason Collins became the first active male in one of the four major North American team sports to announce he was gay.

On July 12, 2013, Tellem became part-owner of Israel's Hapoel Jerusalem B.C. basketball team. He sold his interest in the franchise in 2016.

On June 5, 2015, Tellem resigned from WMG and joined the front office of Palace Sports & Entertainment. At the time, he ranked first among NBA player agents in players repped (42), All-Stars (12), maxed-out contracts (six) and clients' salaries ($324,980,992).

== Personal life ==
Tellem is married to Nancy Tellem, former entertainment and digital media president of Microsoft. They met in 1974 while both were summer interns in Washington, D.C. Nancy, a Cal junior from San Francisco, worked for Oakland congressman Ron Dellums. Arn, a sophomore at Haverford, had been hired by another California representative, Jerome Waldie, a member of the House Judiciary Committee. The couple has three sons: Michael, Matty and Eric. His son Matty, previously worked in multiple stations for the Brooklyn Nets for 13 years (including their last season when they went by the New Jersey Nets) and held a front office role for their G League affiliate, the Long Island Nets. Matty was recently hired as the newest Assistant General Manager of the Phoenix Suns on June 10, 2024, alongside former University of South Florida head coach Brian Gregory's hiring for vice president of player programming.

The fictional agent Arliss Michaels of the HBO sitcom Arli$$ was partly based on Tellem. In the Japanese press, he is known by the oxymoron omoiyari no aru dairinin, "the compassionate agent." "We feel he understands the needs of the Japanese people," says sportswriter Chiho Yamashita.

== Accolades ==
In 2008, Tellem was inducted into the Southern California Jewish Sports Hall of Fame.

In 2015, he was elected to the Philadelphia Jewish Sports Hall of Fame.

In 2018, he was elected to the Michigan Jewish Sports Hall of Fame.

In 2021, he was named the 2022 Mackinac Policy Conference Chairman by the Detroit Regional Chamber.
