= Total Attack!! Soccer =

1993 board game

Total Attack!! Soccer is a 1993 board game published by Dakota Productions.

== Gameplay ==
Total Attack!! Soccer is a game in which a soccer match is simulated for two players with a strong emphasis on strategy and realism. The rules are multilingual, available in English, Spanish, French, German, and Arabic. Gameplay is primarily skill-based, with dice used optionally for riskier maneuvers. Players can choose between methodical ball advancement or aggressive offensive plays. Each turn offers 11 movement points (15 in the advanced version) to distribute among the team's 10 fielders, who can each move up to three hexes. While dribbling is free, passing and shooting consume movement points, requiring players to carefully plan their tactics.

== Publication history ==
Total Attack Soccer was designed by Bruce Powell and Don Lawn and published by Dakota Productions, and includes a 22" x 15" hex-grid board featuring standard soccer field markings, along with a scoring board, timing track, penalty shot cards, dice, and 27 playing pieces.

== Reception ==
Pyramid magazine reviewed Total Attack Soccer and stated that "Total Attack Soccer is a board game for two players that recreates a soccer game - and does it very well."

== Reviews ==
- Review by game designer Steffan O'Sullivan
