= APBA =

American sports-based board game company

APBA (pronounced "APP-bah") is a game company founded in Lancaster, Pennsylvania. It was created in 1951 by trucking firm purchaser J. Richard Seitz (1915-1992). The acronym stands for "American Professional Baseball Association", the name of a board game league Seitz devised in 1931 with eight high school classmates. After World War II, he formed APBA Game Co., working out of his living room. In 2011, after 60 years in Pennsylvania, the company headquarters was moved to Alpharetta, Georgia.

The company's first offering was a baseball simulation table game using cards to represent each major league player, boards to represent different on-base scenarios (e.g. "Bases Empty", "Runners on First and Third," "Bases Loaded"), and dice to generate random numbers. Seitz's mail-order product derived from the game National Pastime, invented and patented by Clifford Van Beek in 1925, a game that Seitz played in his youth. The game can be played against another person or solitaire. Devoted fans keep track of the results and assess how players' performances compare to their real-life statistics.

The game company later produced football, golf, basketball, hockey, bowling, boxing, soccer, and saddle racing games modeled after the baseball game (cards, boards, and dice).

In the 1980s and 1990s, computer adaptations of some of these games were produced.

APBA enthusiasts have included Presidents George H. W. Bush and George W. Bush; presidential son-in-law David Eisenhower; New York mayor Ed Koch; actor Jeff Daniels; ballplayers Bump Wills, Jim Sundberg and Dave Magadan; sports agent and Detroit Pistons vice chairman Arn Tellem; MLB writer Rick Hummel; and journalist and memoirist Franz Lidz.

For much of its history, APBA's main competitor has been Strat-O-Matic. Other rivals include, or have included, Replay Publishing, Statis Pro Baseball, MLB Showdown and, in APBA's early years, Big League Manager. In 2000 APBA redesigned the packaging of its baseball game and for a brief time expanded its marketing approach to include hobby shops and sport card dealers, with limited success.

== Computer versions of the baseball game ==
In 1984, the game company authorized a computer version of an advanced "master" version of their baseball game. It was published by Random House in 1985, first for PC computers and later for Apple. McGraw-Hill became the publisher after the company acquired Random House's software division in 1989, and the original game developers, Miller Associates, took over publishing and sales in 1990.

In 1993, Miller and APBA announced a version of the game for the Windows platform, and it came out that summer. It received a perfect 10 out of 10 score from Electronic Entertainment. Titled APBA Presents Baseball for Windows (with the first two words in small print), Miller continued to update and publish the game software; their final version, 5.5, came out in the summer of 1999. Late in 2000, APBA announced that it had agreed to take over sales and service for the game; Miller Associates disbanded.

In February 2007 the APBA Game Company announced that they had acquired the rights to the Baseball for Windows code, and planned an upgrade to be released in the fall of 2008, featuring the voice of Pete Van Wieren, replacing the earlier editions' Ernie Harwell. Complications in game development, as well as errors in the code that had gone long unrepaired, delayed the release. As of November 2011, the current release schedule has not been announced. The current version of the game runs on Windows 7 in 32-bit mode. For 64 bit versions of Windows 7, it requires Virtual Mode software. Some APBA players maintain computers with older versions of Windows solely for running the APBA software.

In August 2012, APBA released an updated version of Baseball for Windows 5.5, called APBA Computer Baseball version 5.75. The game came with 3 complete major league seasons(1921, 1961, and 2011). This release was updated again in 2015 with the seasons included changed to 1957, 1976, and 2014. Game players can order additional disks individually for all major league seasons from 1901 through the present, with other special disks also available.

=== Reception ===
Computer Gaming World in 1992 criticized aspects of version 1.5's interface, but praised the sophistication of the MicroManager module's BaseballTalk language for creating custom managers for simulated games. The magazine called APBA "a work in progress, an impressive baseball park under construction ... but for what it delivers today, at the price asked, APBA Baseball would not be my first choice".

Computer Gaming World in 1993 approved of the "gorgeous" ballparks, sophisticated drafting and statistical options, and "easy-to-use interface" of APBA Presents: Baseball for Windows. The magazine concluded that the developers should "be congratulated for making a true Windows product", with "realistic representation of baseball".

APBA Baseball for Windows was a finalist for Computer Gaming World's Sports Game of the Year award, losing to Front Page Sports Football Pro. The editors wrote that despite new graphics "it is still the statistical model and replay accuracy of this new game, like its venerable ancestor, that command's everyone's attention".

== In popular culture ==
References to APBA have appeared in many novels and videos. Many APBA fans see similarity in Robert Coover's novel The Universal Baseball Association, Inc., J. Henry Waugh, Prop., which follows a man who develops his own game, gets too involved with the fictional players and characters he invents, and ultimately loses his mind.

Author Soren Narnia makes APBA the center of his 2006 novel "Roll! They Cried;" the chance to right past wrongs leads a ballplayer to attempt redemption through his APBA card.

David Duchovny's novel Bucky F*cking Dent references the narrators' father playing APBA Football as an escape.

Many sports publications have published accounts of the games' appeal. In December, 1980, Franz Lidz wrote an excellent piece in Sports Illustrated called "APBA IS THE NAME, BASEBALL IS THE GAME, AND OBSESSION IS THE RESULT," which highlighted the devotion felt towards the game by fans and ballplayers alike.

== Conventions and tournaments ==
APBA continues to have a devoted following, with conventions now held every year under the game company's sponsorship. The highlight of the convention is a tournament played by the attendees.

APBA conventions go back as far as June 1973, when more than 300 fans got together at the Bellevue-Stratford Hotel in Philadelphia for a convention sponsored by the game's independent publication, the APBA Journal. David Eisenhower was among the attendees. The convention tournament was won by Robert Weeks. A record 650 got together in New York City in June 1975, with Barry Koopersmith the tournament winner. The third and final APBA Journal convention was held in June 1976 in Philadelphia, with Richard Beggs winning the tournament. The tournament structure for those conventions allowed participants to construct a team from all the cards they owned.

(The Journal continued to be published under different management until 2002, but never held another convention.)

Conventions resumed in Lancaster in July 1995 under game company sponsorship. The tournament was limited to stock teams that finished with percentages between .480 and .515. Chris Dineen's 1982 Expos prevailed. The June 1998 tournament, held in nearby Millersville, was limited to teams with percentages below .550. Ten-year-old Devin Flawd won, using the 1995 Mariners.

Conventions have been held annually beginning in 2001 (aside from 2020, due to restrictions enforced during the COVID-19 pandemic). All except 2003 were sponsored by the game company. The limits on team winning percentages were dropped after 2002.

The 2013 convention was held near the new corporate offices in Georgia; it was unique in that it produced the first back-to-back tournament winner (Steve Skoff). In addition, Brian Wells, a two-time winner himself, was inducted into the APBA Hall of Fame along with his father, Greg Wells (who won the 2013 APBA Football championship, defeating Greg Barath in Canton, Ohio, home of the Pro Football Hall of Fame.)

In 2021, Steve Skoff became the first three-time champion, and Brian Wells followed him in 2023. John Duke (wins in 2007 and 2009) is the only other two-time champion.

== Convention tournament results ==
Year - Location - Winner - Team

- 1973% - Philadelphia, PA - Bob Weeks - (All Star Teams were used)
- 1975% - New York City, NY - Barry Koopersmith - (All Star Teams were used)
- 1976% - New York City, NY - Richard Beggs - (All Star Teams were used)
- 1995 - Lancaster, PA - Chris Dineen - 1982 Montreal Expos
- 1998 - Millersville, PA - Devin Flawd - 1995 Seattle Mariners
- 1999 - Lancaster, PA - Mini-Camp - Karl Hasselbarth - 1978 Texas Rangers def. Ted Knorr - 1978 Pittsburgh Pirates
- 2001 - Lancaster, PA - Paul Cunningham - 1976 Oakland Athletics def. Sam Adams - 1970 Boston Red Sox
- 2002 - Lancaster, PA - Brian Wells# - 2000 Arizona Diamondbacks def. Art Carter - 1992 St. Louis Cardinals
- 2003% - Lancaster, PA - Todd Davis - 1977 Kansas City Royals def. Devin Flawd - 1982 Philadelphia Phillies
- 2004 - Las Vegas, NV - Eric Naftaly - 1957 Atlanta Braves def. Joe Krakowski - 1969 Baltimore Orioles
- 2005 - Lancaster, PA - John Hunt - 1975 Cincinnati Reds def. Frank Welsh - 1957 Atlanta Braves
- 2006 - Las Vegas, NV - Bob King - 1977 Philadelphia Phillies def. Jackson Chapman - 1930 Philadelphia Athletics
- 2007 - Frazer, PA - John Duke* - 1927 New York Yankees def. Dan Trout - 1970 Baltimore Orioles
- 2008 - Las Vegas, NV - Brian Wells* - 2001 Seattle Mariners def. Mike Harlow - 1956 Brooklyn Dodgers
- 2009 - Lancaster, PA - John Duke* - 1909 Pittsburgh Pirates def. Walt Husted - 1930 St. Louis Cardinals
- 2010 - Lancaster, PA - Ron Seamans - 1969 Baltimore Orioles def. Brian Wells - 2004 St. Louis Cardinals
- 2011 - Lancaster, PA - Chris Sorce - 1930 St. Louis Cardinals def. Ray Ouellette - 1911 New York Giants
- 2012 - Lancaster, PA - Steve Skoff* - 1912 New York Giants def. Charlie Sorce - 1910 Philadelphia A's
- 2013 - Alpharetta, GA - Steve Skoff* - 1911 New York Giants def. Pat McGregor - 1995 Cleveland Indians
- 2013 - Canton, OH (Football) - Greg Wells - 1984 Forty-Niners def. Greg Barath - 1999 St. Louis Rams
- 2014 - Alpharetta, GA - Paul Trinkle - 1916 Brooklyn Robins def. Leroy "Skeet" Carr - 2011 Texas Rangers
- 2015 - Alpharetta, GA - Kevin Cluff - 1998 New York Yankees def. Billy Bell - 2013 Detroit Tigers
- 2016 - Alpharetta, GA - Roy Langhans - 1985 St. Louis Cardinals def. Steve Ryan - 1998 Atlanta Braves
- 2017 - Alpharetta, GA - Dave Sweeley - 1972 Pittsburgh Pirates def. Bill Lilly - 1968 Detroit Tigers
- 2018 - Alpharetta, GA - Greg Wells - 1905 New York Giants def. Steve Ryan - 1998 Atlanta Braves
- 2019 - Alpharetta, GA - Amy Wyks° - 2017 Washington Nationals def. Mike Kehrer - 2017 Washington Nationals
- 2020 - No Tournament was held due to COVID-19 Pandemic
- 2021 - Alpharetta, GA - Steve Skoff@ - 2019 Los Angeles Dodgers def. Kevin Cluff - 2019 Los Angeles Dodgers
- 2022 - Alpharetta, GA - Mike Kehrer - 2021 Atlanta Braves def. Greg Wells - 2019 Houston Astros
- 2023 - Alpharetta, GA - Brian Wells@ - 2004 St. Louis Cardinals def. Johnnie Hubbard - 2019 Houston Astros
- 2024 - Alpharetta, GA - Glen Jackson - 1968 Detroit Tigers def. Kevin Cluff - 2019 Houston Astros
- 2025 - Alpharetta, GA - Steve Skoff& - 2019 Houston Astros def. Greg Wells - 2024 Philadelphia Phillies

Key:

- @ Three-time Champion (Brian Wells)
- * Two-time Champions (John Duke)
- # Youngest Champion (Brian Wells, age 9 in 2002)
- ° First Female Champion (Amy Wyks, 2019)
- % Not sponsored by APBA game company, but champion recognized
- & Four-time Champion (Steve Skoff)

== Face-to-face and mail leagues ==
A large part of the APBA world is players competing against one another in a wide variety of draft leagues, where players assemble teams and play against other competitors. Some leagues have lasted over four decades, and FTF (face-to-face) leagues are centered in Philadelphia, Greater New York and Washington, D.C.
