= Diceball =

Board game

- A Diceball! set, consisting of a board, two sets of 4 pawns, 1 ball-piece, two sets of 6 dice, two dice cups, one rule book and one pad of scoresheets.
- Designers: Louis Desjardins; Daniel Girard
- Publishers: Intellijeux INC.
- Years active: 1991 - present
- Genres: Board game Baseball game Dice game
- Languages: English, French
- Players: 2
- Setup time: 10–30 seconds
- Playing time: 45 minutes
- Chance: High (dice rolling)
- Skills: Strategy, probability

Diceball! is a board game in which two players roll dice to simulate a baseball game, one representing the visiting team and the other the home team. Both players use the dice to throw the baseball from the mound to the plate and field the ball on defense. Diceball! was designed to mirror the statistical reality of baseball. A regular game of Diceball! without extra innings lasts about 45 minutes.

== History ==
The game was designed in 1979 on a pizza box by a 16-year old Daniel Girard from Rawdon, Québec, while the Montreal Expos were chasing the pennant in the National League. Girard brought his game to his high school, where he organized tournaments with other students. Given the popularity of the game in his school, Girard also brought his game to university where it also became popular. The interest created by the game was noticed by entrepreneur Louis Desjardins, who launched the game with Girard.

== Gameplay and rules ==
To start the game, the visiting team puts a pawn (as a batter and eventually runner) in the batter's box, to get the pitcher's throws. The die replaces the ball. The pitcher rolls the die until either the batter is struck out, the batter is walked, or the ball is hit. If the ball is hit, the offensive team rolls a die to determine the number of dice to be used to hit the ball.

The number of dice indicated are rolled and added up. Numbers from 1 to 36 show the location where the ball is hit and the ball is placed on the game board. If the ball is hit on a circle, the ball was hit in the air and an out is recorded. If the ball is hit on a number in a cloud, it is a ground ball and that the batter will have to try to reach a base before the defense throws to that base. If the ball is hit to a star-shaped zone, the runner starts to run around the bases while the defence recovers the ball on the star. If the stars are from 27 to 36 it is a home run and all runners score.

Every batter who runs around the bases and reaches home plate before three outs scores a run. As soon as three outs are recorded, stranded runners are removed from the bases. The teams trade places: the defense becomes the offense.

=== Basic version ===
In the basic version of Diceball, pawns are used as defensive players and are also used as runners by the opponent. A white pawn is used as a ball. The offense use dice to hit the ball in different spots on the game board and the offensive players try to move the players toward home plate as the defense try to stop the offense by forwarding the ball around.

=== Expert version ===
An expert section in the rule book includes more baseball features like stolen bases, sacrifice bunts and sacrifice flies.

== Strategy ==
Strategy plays a role. The ability to decide when to run around the bases or to stop will create momentum or result in outs. Players have the power to try to steal a base, to order a bunt to try to send a runner to second to avoid a double play and/or put a player in a scoring position. A player can also try to advance or score on a sacrifice fly. All these extra plays are subjected to the laws of probability like the rest of the rules of Diceball.

== Reception ==
Diceball! got positive reviews upon its launch in the United States and Canada. Games Magazine named it as one of the top Games 100 in the United States in 1991, 1992 and 1993.

Although the luck of the dice plays a major role in this baseball board game, players can make plenty of decisions that affect the outcome. For instance, the dice may tell you that you've just hit a liner to center, but it's up to you to decide whether to try stretching it to a double and whether the runner on second should risk going wee wee wee all the way home. For a more challenging game, use the advanced rules for basestealing, hit-and-run plays, etc.

Burt Hochberg, a senior Games magazine editor said in an interview he gave to the Montreal Gazette:

When I first heard about it, I asked myself what the hell Canadians knew about baseball. Then I played it. Now I take Diceball with me when I travel.

In January 1994, Diceball was presented in the American International Toy Fair in New York and Girard, the Diceball inventor, said in an interview to the Montreal Gazette:

The first harbinger of success came at Dorval airport, where a suspicious U.S. customs agent examined one of the games closely and then tried to buy it on the spot.

The Unistar Radio Networks of New York (lately Westwood One) described it as the best baseball game on the market:

If you like baseball and games you have to try Diceball. Up till now the only baseball board games available have been either the statistical kind with individual player cards and lots of charts or some totally juvenile kind of game with spinners. Diceball is a truly original simulation of our national pastime. The fielders actually run to retrieve the ball while the runners are rounding the bases. This is all done through the roll of dice. There is plenty of strategy for fans like myself who want to see how well we can manage a team and yet the game is so simple that it can be played just for the fun of it. The statistics from the game are amazingly close to real baseball. You will hear the roar of the crowd and smell the hot dogs when you play Diceball. There should be a warning on the box that the game is addictive. My game club can`t stop playing it and we already have a media league set up in the New York area. Because of its originality and great playability I give Diceball the highest rating as the best baseball game on the market today.

The Canadian Toy Testing Council, a non-profit agency, that publishes a toy report yearly included Diceball in its 1994 report. The game received a three-star rating, the highest score. According to the Montreal Gazette, the game was shipped off to 300 test families in the Ottawa-Hull area for evaluation. Response was excellent across the board, especially from players who liked baseball. Diceball has won the council's highest accolade, a three-star rating.

The game was also reviewed in USA Today and received press coverage in Canada's national newspaper, The Globe and Mail, The Toronto Star and The Ottawa Citizen. It was also featured in Quebec in La Presse and Le Journal de Montréal. In Canada, Diceball! garnered television coverage on CTV Television Network and Canadian Broadcasting Corporation.

== Social and tournament play ==
Before and while it was launched, Diceball! was the center of many tournaments, in schools, colleges and workplaces. Former Expos pitcher Denis Boucher won a Diceball! tournament involving sports reporters in Montreal. After the tournament, Boucher said, "you will find in Diceball! all the things that happen in real baseball." He added that playing the game is a great way to spend time with friends. By winning the Diceball! tournament, Boucher was given a $250 cheque that he gave to the Sun Youth Organization.

== Statistical accuracy ==
Diceball! got positive press reviews partly because of its statistical similarities to the game of baseball. In Diceball! the batter puts the ball in play 66% of the time compared to 76% in Major League Baseball. The batter is struck out 23% of the time, against 15% in baseball. 11% of the at-bats end up in walks compared to 9% in baseball. The ball is hit a few less times in Diceball! However, the game is balanced out by the greater probability of getting a base hit when the ball is hit (.339 vs. .304).

Taking into accounts strikeouts, the offensive average in Diceball! is almost the same as baseball. .251 versus .254. Since there are more walks and errors in Diceball! than in real baseball, the players on-base percentage is .349 compared to .340 in real baseball. Even the odds of getting an out are realistic. 33.6% of ground balls in Diceball! (34.8% in baseball) 11.7% are flyballs or liners to the infield (14.7% in baseball) and 20.8% are fly balls in the outfield (20.1% in baseball). On average one more runner gets on base from each team in a Diceball! game than in a Major League Baseball game.

The more dice rolled on a hit ball, the greater the probability of getting a base hit. With one die, the average is .167; with 2 it is .278; with 3, .287; with 4 dice, it is .356; with 5 dice .351; with 6 dice, the average climbs to .472. The overall average when the ball is hit in play is .319, not counting infield hits. Adding infield hits, the overall average when the ball is hit is .339.

== Use in schools ==
Praised for its statistical accuracy, Diceball! was used in schools in the US to teach youngsters the virtues of understanding statistics.
