= Statis Pro Baseball =

Baseball simulation board game

Statis Pro Baseball was a strategic baseball simulation board game. It was created by Jim Barnes in 1970, named after a daily newspaper column he wrote for an Iowa morning newspaper, and published by Avalon Hill in 1978, and new player cards were made for each new season until 1992. A licensing dispute with Major League Baseball led Avalon Hill to cease production of new cards. The game, however, came with instructions for players to create their own cards, so each year many people produce their own player cards, and some even sell them online.

Due to the nature of the gameplay, the game was suitable for both solitary and head-to-head play.

== Game set ==
The game set included player cards for most Major League players from the previous season, for all of the Major League Baseball teams, with position players and pitchers receiving different types of cards. In earlier sets, National League pitchers were assigned two cards—one for pitching and one for hitting—but this was changed by 1988, when each team was assigned a single card representing all its pitchers.

The set also included a rectangular game board, which resembled a baseball diamond. Around the diamond were arrayed spots to place the stack of cards for the batters and pitchers for each team. There were also several cards which allowed results from bunting, base stealing, extra bases, etc. to be determined (see below).

To facilitate play, a large deck of 98 cards with random results was used. These were called Fast Action Cards (FACs), and were used instead of dice, which many similar games utilized. Each card had four results—two per side, one right-side up, one upside-down—which increased the possible number of results. The random numbers utilized an octal (base 8) system (using 1–8) and ran from 11 to 88, excluding numbers ending in 9 or 0 (i.e., 11–18, 21–28 ... 81–88), for a total of 64 numbers. The cards also contained further information used for gameplay (as detailed below).

Additionally, the game included "out" sheets to enable the player to determine how outs were made during a particular at-bat (see below for more detail). Finally, tracking play was done with scorecards, similar to those used to track the results of a real Major League game, but with additional spaces for information necessary for the game.

== Player cards ==
Batter cards contained the following information:

- Name
- Games by position
- Error Rating, by position: E0 (best) through E10
- Throwing Rating: TA (best) through TC for catchers; T2 (worst) through T5 for outfielders
- OBR (Baserunning Ability): A (best) through E
- SP (Base-stealing Ability): A (best) through E
- H&R (Hit & Run Ability): 0 (worst) through 2
- CD (Clutch Defense Ability): 0 (worst) through 2 (pre-1988); 1 (worst) through 4 (1988 and on)
- SAC (Bunting Ability): AA (best) through DD
- INJ (Injury Rating): 0 (fewest games missed) through 8
- BD (Clutch Hitting Ability): 0 (worst) through 2 (pre-1988); individualized chart (1988 and on)
- CHT (type of hitter): R, L, or S (right, left, or switch) plus N or P (normal or power), for six combinations (RN, RP, LN, LP, SN, SP)

In addition, each batter would have ranges for the following results (proportionate to the batter's likelihood of achieving each result):

- 1BF: Infield single
- 1B7: Single to Left-field
- 1B8: Single to Center-field
- 1B9: Single to Right-field
- 2B7: Double to Left-field
- 2B8: Double to Center-field
- 2B9: Double to Right-field
- 3B8: Triple to Center-field
- HR: Home run
- K: Strikeout
- W: Walk
- HBP: Hit by pitch
- Out: Out (consult chart for type)

Pitcher cards contained the following information:

- Name
- Right or Left-handed
- CD (Clutch Defense Ability): 0 (worst) through 2 (pre-1988); 1 (worst) through 4 (1988 and on)
- INJ (Injury Rating): 0 (fewest games missed) through 8
- Games Pitched (total)
- Error Rating: E0 (best) through E10
- PB Range (Skill, based mostly on ERA and wins): 2-5 (worst) through 2–9
- SR (Starting Reduction Value, measuring endurance): 0 (worst) through 20
- RR (Relief Reduction Value, measuring endurance): 0 (worst) through 20
- Appearances (Starting or Relief): number of games pitched in each instance

In addition, each pitcher would have ranges for the following results (proportionate to the pitcher's likelihood of achieving each result):

- 1BF: Infield single
- 1B7: Single to Left-field
- 1B8: Single to Center-field
- 1B9: Single to Right-field
- BK: Balk
- K: Strikeout
- W: Walk
- PB: Passed ball
- WP: Wild Pitch
- Out: Out (consult chart for type)

Originally the game was played with a set of dice and a yellow cardboard square which had result numbers 11–88 as well as results for clutch hitting, pitching, and defense arranged in a circle within the square. A metal spinner was affixed to the center of the square. Play was incorporated by rolling the dice to get a number between 2–12 which would determine if the play result would come from the pitchers card or the batters card. Then the spinner would be spun and the resulting number or other occurrence would give the play result.

== Basic gameplay ==
Much like a real game, a game of Statis Pro Baseball would begin by choosing teams, pitchers, and line-ups. This could be done with two players, each managing a different team, or with one player managing both. In order to simulate a real season, each player card indicated which positions a players was allowed to play, and for how many games during a full season (e.g., a card might indicate a player could play 100 games at shortstop, 30 games at third base, and 10 games at catcher; similarly, a pitcher might indicate 10 games as a starter, and 25 as a reliever).

Each at-bat was simulated the same way. First, a Fast Action Card (FAC) would be drawn to determine a PB number, from 2 to 12. This would be compared to the PB rating on the pitcher's card, which ranged from 2–5 for bad pitchers to 2–9 for great pitchers. If the PB number was "in range", a new FAC would be drawn, and the random number would be compared to the pitcher's card to determine the result of the at-bat. If the PB number was "out of range", the resulting random number would be compared to the batter's card to determine the result.

For example, suppose a PB 2–9 pitcher is in the game, and that the PB number drawn is 6. This is "in range" (that is, between 2 and 9). Next, a random number is drawn—assume that number is 41. Looking at the hypothetical pitcher's card, we see that 41 is a strikeout. Thus, the at-bat is complete. If, however, the original PB number drawn was 10, it would be "out of range" and the random number would be compared to the batter's card. For this hypothetical batter, 41 is a home run. Using this example, it can be seen that the results depend a lot on whether the PB is "in" or "out" of range—simulating whether the pitcher or the batter controls that at-bat. Thus, 2–9 pitchers will be more effective because they control more at-bats than 2–5 pitchers.

Most of the results of any given PB and Random Number draw will be obvious to those who know baseball—1B, 2B, 3B, HR, K, BB are all familiar from boxscores. If, however, the random number falls into the Out range on either the batter or pitcher card, another FAC must be drawn to determine the type of out. Matching the CHT code with the FAC, the type of out could be determined. The outs used standard baseball scorekeeping (1=Pitcher, 2=Catcher ... 9=Right fielder), matched with codes unique to Statis Pro. These codes were then matched with the out charts to determine the exact result, based on number and position of the runners on base. The codes were as follows (using shortstop as an example):

- F6 = Fly ball out to Shortstop (runners hold)
- L6 = Line-drive out to shortstop (runners hold)
- G6 = Groundball out to shortstop (double play, if applicable)
- Gx6 = Groundball out to shortstop (lead runner forced out, if applicable)
- G6A = Groundball out to shortstop (runners advance)

Finally, if the code had an asterisk next to it, a final FAC would be drawn to check for error. This was done by comparing the error range on the FAC to the error rating of the fielder. For example, if the fielder's error rating was E2 and the error rating on the FAC was F8 to F10, then there would be no error.

== Clutch play ==
In order to simulate "clutch" play, every player was assigned rating for BD (clutch hitting) and CD (clutch defense). These situations would be initiated by PB numbers on cards reading either BD or CD.

BD would only apply if runners were on base. In that case, a second FAC would be drawn for the Random Number. For pre-1988 cards, each batter was assigned a BD rating of 0, 1, or 2. The BD rating plus the Random Number would be compared to the BD Chart on the game board, possibly resulting in an extra-base hit. For 1988 and later, each batter had a unique BD rating on his card—the Random Number would be compared to the card, and the Chart could be ignored. If the Random Number fell outside the hit range on either the Chart or the card, play would resume with a new PB number.

If CD was drawn as the PB number, a second FAC would be drawn to determine the position involved. Next, a third FAC would be drawn for a Random Number. Using the CD rating of position player (pre-1988, CD0 through CD2; 1988 and later, CD1 through CD4) and the Random Number, the CD chart would be consulted to determine the outcome of the play.

== Unusual plays ==
Very occasionally, a PB number of Z would be drawn. Z indicated an unusual play, and would result in drawing of a second FAC for the Random Number, and then consulting the Unusual Play Chart. Random Numbers of 11–44 covered unusual plays such as ejections, catcher interference, rainouts, etc. Numbers 44–78 covered unlikely defensive plays, such as triple plays (although many were applicable only if specific combinations of runners were on base). Finally, numbers 81–88 indicated that an injury had occurred. This led to the drawing of another Random Number to determine the result of the play and who was injured. Then, using another Random Number matched with the player's INJ rating, the number of games to be missed could be determined (the fewer games missed in real-life, the fewer games missed in the simulation).

== Advanced gameplay ==
Though an entire game could be played as described above, Statis Pro had a number of advanced features to simulate managerial/coaching decisions such as bunting, base-stealing, hitting-and-running, taking extra bases, playing the infield in, etc. In most cases, these would be done by the manager of the hitting team announcing a decision before the draw of a PB number for a new batter.

In order to steal a base, for example, the manager would announce which runner was stealing. A FAC would be drawn, and the resulting Random Number would be compared to the base-stealing chart on the game board. The results varied based on whether the runner was stealing second, third, or home. Depending on the draw, it might be necessary to consult the runner's SP (base-stealing) rating.

To sacrifice bunt, the process would be the same as for stealing, except that the sacrifice bunting chart would be used. The results would depend on the Random Number and the batter's Sac (sacrifice bunting) rating.

From the pitching side, in order to simulate fatigue, every pitcher would be assigned a two Reduction Ratings (one for starting, one for relief). Each time the pitcher surrendered a hit, walk, run, wild pitch, or hit batsman, his rating would be reduced by one point (e.g., a walk and then a home run would be 4 points - one each for the walk and the hit, and then two for the runs scored). Once a pitcher's Reduction Rating reached zero, a PB number would no longer be drawn for each hitter—instead, all at-bats would begin with a FAC Random Number draw being compared to the hitter's card. Because of this, it was usually advisable to remove a pitcher once his reduction hit zero (or even before).

== Online community ==
Since Avalon Hill ceased production, many players have resorted to creating their own player cards, using the formulas provided in the game instructions. Some have even created new FACs to make the Random Number and PB Number draws more truly random. Others have created new rules in order to add further realism to the game (such as rules for foul balls, special rules for different ballparks, etc.). Market Leader On-Line Forum Link - https://forums.delphiforums.com/statprobaseball/start
