= Dynasty League Baseball =

Board game

Dynasty League Baseball Powered By Pursue the Pennant is a baseball-themed board game first published by Design Depot in 1994. Dynasty League Baseball Online for Mac and Windows OS debuted in 2011.

== Description ==
Dynasty League Baseball is a tabletop game which incorporates ballpark effects, clutch hitting and pitching, and many other nuances of the game.

== Publication history ==
Dynasty League Baseball was first published by Design Depot in 1995, and was designed by Michael Cieslinski. It was originally known as Pursue the Pennant.

== Reception ==
William W. Connors comments: "There's so much detail and careful thought in every aspect of Dynasty League Baseball, it can only be described as a labor of love. And, to my way of thinking, that's what sets great games apart from good games — the certain knowledge that the designer had as much fun creating it as you do playing it."

Dynasty League Baseball won the Games 100 best family strategy game for sports in 1995.
