= Strat-O-Matic =

Sports simulation game company

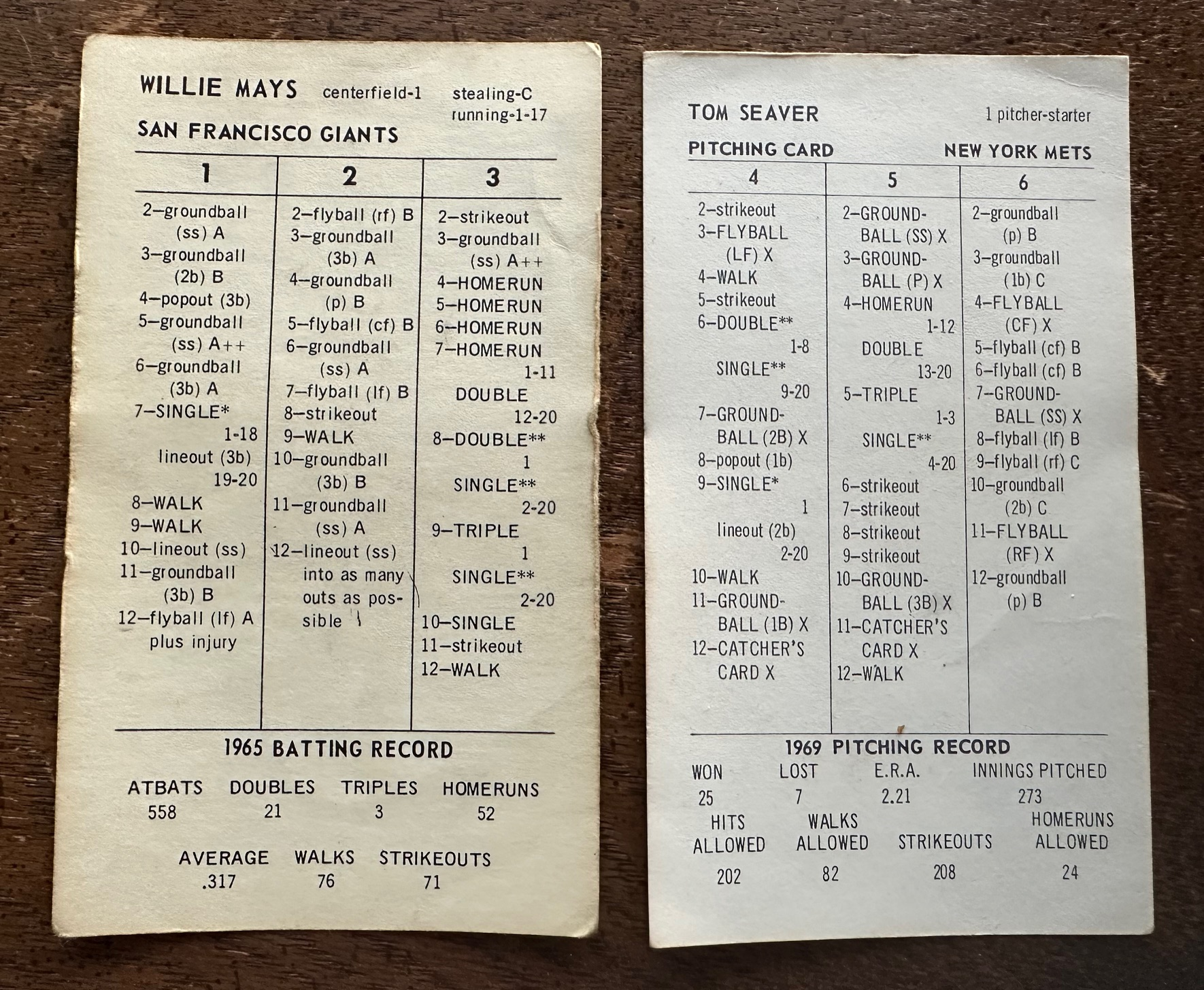
Strat-O-Matic basic version batter and pitcher cards from their baseball game

Strat-O-Matic is a game company based in Glen Head, New York, that develops and publishes sports simulation games. It produces tabletop baseball, American football, basketball, and ice hockey simulations, as well as personal computer adaptations of each, but it is primarily known for its baseball game.

== History ==
Strat-O-Matic began as a company in 1961, when Hal Richman, a Bucknell University mathematics student, began selling an early version of his baseball tabletop game out of his basement, buying advertising space in Sports Illustrated. Richman lost money until 1963, when his decision to release a game containing one card for each player in Major League Baseball resulted in greatly increased sales. Richman later released a football game in 1968, an "advanced" baseball game in 1972, a basketball game in 1973, and a hockey game in 1978.

Strat-O-Matic's statistical research and game development methods are implemented with the intent of replicating athletes' abilities as accurately as possible, giving the gamer the feel of making managerial decisions.

In February 2011, Strat-O-Matic celebrated its 50th anniversary with an opening day event at the Community Church of New York. This was a change from the normal opening day festivities of fans lining up outside the company's headquarters in Glen Head to pick up their new baseball products. At this event, over 500 people attended and heard from panelists including Doug Glanville, Rick Peterson and STATS, Inc. founder John Dewan.

In March 2011, Richman was inducted into the National Jewish Sports Hall of Fame.

== How it works ==
In a Strat-O-Matic game, each athlete is represented by a player card, on which are printed various ratings and result tables for dice rolls. A player, who may play solitaire or against another player, is in charge of making strategic and personnel decisions for their team, while determining the results of in game decisions by cross-referencing dice rolls with a system of printed charts and tables. The basic scheme may be understood in connection with the adjoining images, representing the baseball game. One die selects which column is used on either the batter or the pitcher card, while the other two dice specify the outcome within the column.

The results on the player cards are determined by a combination of the respective athlete's real-life statistics for the previous year and (mostly in the case of the baseball game) independent research of news articles and scouting reports. All Strat-O-Matic games offer a "basic", "advanced", and "super-advanced" version; the more advanced versions give more strategic options to players while taking into account additional nuances of an athlete's abilities (e.g., in baseball, differences in hitting vs. left-handed or right-handed pitchers). The computer adaptations essentially rely on the same algorithms as the tabletop games, but they have the additional advantages of faster play and statistics compilation.

When the new Strat-O-Matic baseball cards are released each year in late January or early February -- an event that hundreds of players commemorate by showing up in the cold at the company's headquarters—controversy soon follows over the deservedness of such statistics. Additionally, there also is an Internet version of the Strat-O-Matic Baseball game. This was formerly hosted by The Sporting News, and is now hosted by the Strat-O-Matic Company.

== Influence ==
Strat-O-Matic games have been played by a wide variety of sports fans, including professional athletes themselves. Former major leaguer Doug Glanville is an avid Strat-O-Matic player and advocate of the company, and his ex-teammate and noted gamer Curt Schilling also plays. Former New York Mets teammates Keith Hernandez and Lenny Dykstra also have proclaimed their devotion. After homering in the ninth inning of Game 3 of the 1986 National League Championship Series, Dykstra said that the last time he had done such a thing was when he played Strat-O-Matic against his brother.

Broadcaster Bob Costas often played Strat-O-Matic in his youth, and credits the game with teaching him about baseball, for instance the importance of on-base percentage and slugging percentage. Author Buzz Bissinger says that "Strat-O-Matic changed my life."

The EMSBL (East Meadow Strat-O-Matic Baseball League), founded in 1972, is believed to be the oldest continuously playing fantasy sports league in the world. The league's 2025 season marked the league's 54th consecutive year of play. Based in East Meadow, N.Y., the league was founded by its first commissioner, Jim Drucker, who later became the commissioner of the Continental Basketball Association (1978–86) and Arena Football League (1994–96).

It was an influence on CompuBox creator and CEO Bob Canobbio.

Games of Strat-O-Matic were shown being played in the Spike Lee film Crooklyn.

Computer sports game designers and producers such as Trip Hawkins and Richard Hilleman have been lifelong Strat-O-Matic players, indirectly influencing the development of rival computer baseball simulation games. In the book Magic the Gathering: The Pocket Players' Guide, it was mentioned that Strat-O-Matic was a strong influence in the game design work of Richard Garfield.

== See also ==
- Strat-O-Matic Football
