= Apple Inc. v. Samsung Electronics Co. =

Apple Inc. vs Samsung Inc.
- Supreme Court of the United States

Argued October 11, 2016 Decided December 6, 2016
- Full case name: Samsung Electronics Co., Ltd., et al. v. Apple Inc.
- Docket no.: 15-777
- Citations: 580 U.S. 53 (more) 137 S. Ct. 429; 196 L. Ed. 2d 363; 120 U.S.P.Q.2d 1749; 85 U.S.L.W. 4019
- Argument: Oral argument

Case history
- Prior: 920 F. Supp. 2d 1079 (N.D. Cal. 2013); 926 F. Supp. 2d 1100 (N.D. Cal. 2013); 786 F.3d 983 (Fed. Cir. 2015); cert. granted, 136 S. Ct. 1453 (2016).
- Subsequent: On remand, 678 F. App'x 1012 (Fed. Cir. 2017).

Holding
- The "article of manufacture," as used in Patent Act provision governing damages for design patent infringement, encompasses both a product sold to a consumer and a component of that product, and components of the infringing smartphones could be the relevant "article of manufacture," although consumers could not purchase those components separately from the smartphones.

Court membership
- Chief Justice John Roberts Associate Justices Anthony Kennedy · Clarence Thomas; Ruth Bader Ginsburg · Stephen Breyer; Samuel Alito · Sonia Sotomayor; Elena Kagan

Case opinion
- Majority: Sotomayor, joined by a unanimous court

Laws applied
- 35 U.S.C. § 289

Apple Inc. v. Samsung Inc., 580 U.S. 53, is the general title of a series of patent infringement lawsuits between Apple Inc. and Samsung Inc. in the United States Court system, regarding the design of smartphones and tablet computers. Between them, the two companies have dominated the manufacturing of smartphones since the early 2010s, and made about 40% of all smartphones sold worldwide as of 2024. In early 2011, Apple initiated patent infringement lawsuits against Samsung, who typically responded with countersuits. Apple's multinational litigation over technology patents became known as part of the phone wars: the colloquial term for extensive litigation and fierce competition in the global market for consumer mobile communications.

By late 2011, Apple and Samsung were litigating about twenty cases in ten countries. By the following year they were still embroiled in more than 50 lawsuits worldwide, with billions of dollars in damages claimed between them. While Apple won a ruling in its favor in the United States, Samsung won rulings in South Korea, Japan, and the United Kingdom. On June 4, 2013, Samsung won a limited ban from the U.S. International Trade Commission on sales of certain Apple products after the commission found Apple had violated a Samsung patent, but this was vetoed by U.S. Trade Representative Michael Froman.

In December 2016, the United States Supreme Court decided 8–0 to reverse a lower court decision that awarded hundreds of millions of dollars to Apple and remanded the case to the Federal Circuit Court court to determine which aspects of American patent law had been used correctly or incorrectly in the previous hearings. The two companies finally reached an out-of-court settlement in the United States in 2018.

== Origin ==
On January 4, 2007, several days before the iPhone was announced, Apple filed applications for four design patents covering the basic shape of the iPhone. These were followed in June of that year with a massive filing of a color design patent covering 193 screenshots of various iPhone graphical user interfaces. It is from these filings—along with Apple's utility patents, registered trademarks and trade dress rights—that Apple selected the particular intellectual property claims to enforce against Samsung, which was one of its own suppliers for components. Apple sued Samsung in 2011, alleging in a 38-page complaint with the United States District Court for the Northern District of California that several of Samsung's Android phones and tablets infringed on Apple's intellectual property: its patents, trademarks, user interface, and style. Apple's complaint included specific federal claims for patent infringement, false designation of origin, unfair competition, and trademark infringement, as well as state-level claims for unfair competition, common law trademark infringement, and unjust enrichment.

Apple submitted to the court side-by-side image comparisons of an iPhone 3GS and an i9000 Galaxy S to illustrate the alleged similarities in packaging and icons for apps. However, the images were later found to have been tampered with in order to make the dimensions and features of the two different products seem more similar, and Samsung accused Apple of submitting misleading evidence to the court.

Samsung countersued Apple, filing complaints in courts in South Korea, Japan, and Germany alleging that Apple infringed Samsung's patents for mobile-communications technologies. By mid-2011, Samsung also filed suits against Apple in the British High Court of Justice and in the United States District Court for the District of Delaware, and filed a complaint with the United States International Trade Commission (ITC).

== United States litigation ==
=== First U.S. lawsuit ===
In two separate lawsuits filed with the Northern California District Court in 2011, Apple accused Samsung of infringing on three utility patents and four design patents. Samsung filed a counterclaim accusing Apple of infringing on four of its own patents. At the heart of the dispute was one design patent regarding the shape of a smartphone, with the infringement accusation from Apple consisting of a one-sentence claim about the ornamental design of an electronic device, accompanied by nine figures depicting a thin rectangular cuboid with rounded corners.

In August 2012, the jury returned a verdict largely favorable to Apple, finding that Samsung had willfully infringed on Apple's design and utility patents and had also diluted Apple's trade dress related to the iPhone. The jury awarded Apple $1.049 billion in damages, and rejected Samsung's counterclaim. The jury found that Samsung infringed Apple's utility patents on the iPhone's "bounce-back effect", "on-screen navigation", and "tap to zoom" functions; and design patents that cover iPhone features such as the home button, rounded corners and tapered edges, and on-screen icons. Apple also asserted U.S. patent 7,657,849, which covered unlocking a device by moving a graphical "unlock image" along a predefined displayed path — the mechanism underlying the iPhone's slide-to-unlock feature. A design patent covering the ornamental design of the iPad was one of the few patents the jury concluded Samsung had not infringed. Several months later, the U.S. Patent and Trademark Office tentatively invalidated Apple's patent on bounce-back and pinch-zoom functionality, possibly contradicting the jury's decision at the trial.

The District Court ruling aroused significant controversy among patent law experts and observers of the telecommunications industry. The jury's decision was described as being "Apple-friendly" by Wired and a possible reason for the increased costs—because of licensing fees to Apple—that subsequently affected Android smartphone users. Questions were also raised about the validity of lay juries in the U.S. patent system, because the qualifications of the jury members were deemed inadequate for a complex patent case. Jury foreman Velvin Hogan generated additional controversy when he stated to interviewers that he was an electrical engineer and patent holder, and used his expertise to help the other jurors reach a verdict. This raised questions about whether the jurors made their decision based solely on the law, rather than on personal interests.

Hogan also stated to interviewers that the jury intended the damages awarded to Apple to be sufficiently high to be painful, but not unreasonable. This contradicts traditional jury instructions that "the damages award should put the patent holder in approximately the financial position it would have been in had the infringement not occurred" and "it is meant to compensate the patent holder and not to punish an infringer." Other questions were raised about the jury's quick decision; the jury was given more than 700 questions, including some on highly technical matters, but reached its verdict and awarded Apple more than $1 billion in damages after less than three days of deliberations. Critics claimed that the nine jurors did not have sufficient time to read the jury instructions. A juror stated in an interview with CNET that the jury had decided after just the first day of deliberations that Samsung was in the wrong.

Based on the verdict, Apple filed a request to stop all sales of Samsung products cited in violation of the US patents, including the Infuse 4G and the Droid Charge. This motion was denied by Judge Lucy H. Koh because Apple's claims of irreparable harm had little merit. Koh also decided that the jury had over-calculated the damages to Apple in its initial assessment and ordered a retrial.

Before the second trial could commence, Apple appealed Koh's refusal to accept the motion to stop sales of infringing Samsung products. The Ninth Circuit Court of Appeals accepted Apple's argument and ordered Koh to issue the requested preliminary injunction. The injunction took effect in June 2012, preventing Samsung from making, using, selling, or exporting the Galaxy Nexus and any of its other products that used the disputed patents into the United States. This injunction was lifted after Samsung prevailed at an appeal proceeding four months later.

In September 2012, Samsung requested a new trial at the District Court, arguing that the August verdict was not supported by evidence or testimony, and that the judge imposed limits on testimony time and the number of witnesses, all of which prevented Samsung from receiving a fair trial. The company also claimed that the jury verdict was unreasonable. Simultaneously, Apple filed a motion requesting another $707 million in damages. This matter was readdressed by the District Court in November 2013, with the damages owed by Samsung ultimately being reduced to $290 million. In yet another hearing on the appropriate damages amount, the District Court adjusted the amount again in May 2018, awarding Apple $539 million.

Meanwhile, in October 2012 Samsung appealed its loss in the first trial to the United States Court of Appeals for the Federal Circuit, which has jurisdiction over patent disputes. Samsung requested that Apple's District Court victory be thrown out, with a claim that Hogan, as the foreman of the jury, had not disclosed that he had been sued by his former employer Seagate Technology Inc., which had a strategic relationship with Samsung, despite having been asked during jury selection if he had been involved in lawsuits on the present topic. Samsung also made a claim of jury misconduct, based on Hogan's previous comments to the media on how he used his expertise at the jury trial. Finally, Samsung claimed that the recent decision by the U.S. Patent and Trademark Office on the validity of some of Apple's patents merited a recalculation of damages owed by Samsung.

In May 2015, the Federal Circuit affirmed parts of the jury's verdict at the District Court, but vacated a percentage of the dollar amount pertaining to trade dress infringement and dilution. This decision was appealed to the Supreme Court of the United States. In December 2016, the Supreme Court decided 8–0 to reverse the decision from the first trial based on the patent law standards that had been considered by the District Court jury. The Supreme Court remanded the case to the Federal Circuit court to define the appropriate legal standard to define the "article of manufacture" because it is not the smartphone itself, but could be just the case and screen to which the design patents relate. This matter eventually became moot when Apple and Samsung agreed to an undisclosed settlement in June 2018.

=== Second U.S. lawsuit ===
While the first lawsuit was in progress at the Northern California District Court, in 2012 Apple filed a second lawsuit at the same court seeking $2 billion in damages from Samsung for infringing on another set of Apple design patents for various components of its iPhone, iPod, and Macbook Pro lines. Samsung countersued for $6 million, claiming that Apple had infringed on one of its patents. This trial commenced in March 2014. Judge Koh referred to the new lawsuit as "one action in a worldwide constellation of litigation between the two companies."

In May 2014, another jury awarded Apple $119.6 million for this patent infringement claim. The Guardian called this victory "pyrrhic" and noted that Apple requested more than ten times this amount may have spent more money litigating its various claims against Samsung than what it was ultimately awarded. The jury also found in favor of Samsung in its counterclaim, but only awarded that company $158,400, also significantly less than what had been requested. Judge Koh also denied a request from Apple to ban the sale of Samsung products that included the infringed patents.

Samsung appealed this jury verdict to a three-judge panel at the United States Court of Appeals for the Federal Circuit in 2015. In February 2016, this panel ruled in favor of Samsung, nullifying the jury verdict because the patents at issue were invalid based on existing prior art. Apple requested an en banc hearing from the full Federal Circuit, which overturned its own three-judge panel and ruled in favor of Apple, restoring the $119.6 million award.

Samsung appealed this Federal Circuit ruling to the United States Supreme Court, but that court rejected the request in November 2017. This resulted in affirmation of the Federal Circuit ruling in favor of Apple, but the matter became moot with the June 2018 settlement between the two companies.

== Other litigation ==
Apple and Samsung have also litigated claims in various other countries in which smartphone design and utility patents are valid for regional sales of the devices. The resulting rulings have been inconsistent and have raised questions about the effectiveness of country-level patent protection for products that are sold internationally and manufactured by companies in various nations.

=== Asia and Australia ===
Samsung filed a patent infringement lawsuit against Apple in 2011 at South Korea's Central District Court. In August 2012, that court issued a split decision, ruling that Apple had infringed upon two Samsung technology patents, while Samsung violated one of Apple's patents. The court awarded minor damages to both companies and ordered a temporary sales halt of the infringing products in South Korea; however, none of the banned products were the latest models for either Samsung or Apple. Apple's claims that Samsung copied the designs of the iPhone and iPad were deemed invalid. The court also ruled that there was "no possibility" that consumers would confuse the smartphones of the two brands.

Also in 2011, Apple filed a claim in Australia that Samsung's infringing product should not be sold in that country. An Australian federal court granted Apple's request for an injunction against Samsung's Galaxy Tab 10.1. Samsung appealed this decision and requested an expedited schedule in the hope that the matter would be resolved before the Christmas shopping season. The lower court's injunction was overturned by the High Court of Australia.

Apple initiated a similar lawsuit against Samsung in Japan in 2012. In August of that year, the Tokyo District Court ruled that Samsung's Galaxy smartphones and tablets did not violate an Apple patent on an application that synchronizes music and videos between devices and servers. The court also ruled that legal costs must be reimbursed to Samsung. Presiding Judge Tamotsu Shoji said, "The defendant's products do not seem like they used the same technology as the plaintiff's products so we turn down the complaints made by [Apple]."

=== Europe ===
Apple and Samsung litigated patent infringement cases in several European nations starting in 2011, with implications for device sales across all of the European Union. In August 2011, the Landgericht Court in Germany granted Apple's request for an EU-wide injunction banning Samsung from selling its Galaxy Tab 10.1 device, on the grounds that Samsung's product infringed on two of Apple's patents. When Samsung claimed that Apple had tampered with pictorial evidence during the initial trial, the court rescinded the EU-wide injunction and granted Apple a lesser injunction that only applied to the German market. While these matters were being litigated, analysts determined that Samsung lost sales of up to half a million units in Germany.

Later in 2011, the German court again ruled in favor of Apple, with a sales ban on the Galaxy Tab 10.1 because Samsung had infringed on Apple's patents. Samsung appealed, and in July 2012 the Oberlandesgericht München appeals court reversed the lower court decision to outlaw sales of the offending Samsung products in Germany, with the judges casting doubt on the validity of Apple's patent ownership claims.

In the meantime, Samsung filed patent infringement claims against Apple in France and Italy, requesting that Apple's products be banned from sale in those countries. Samsung reportedly singled out these two countries as key electronic communications markets in Europe, and by filing suit in those countries, tried to make up for its recent loss in Germany. Conversely, Apple sued Samsung in the Netherlands, and achieved a ban on infringing Samsung products from being sold in that country. This resulted in a countersuit from Samsung, but that company failed to win a requested injunction against sales of Apple's product in that country. A higher appeals court ruled in 2012 that Samsung did not infringe on any of Apple's patents and sales bans were lifted.

Samsung also initiated a lawsuit in the United Kingdom, requesting a judicial order that would require Apple to state publicly that Samsung had not copied its designs; Apple countersued with a request in the other direction. Samsung's request was granted, requiring Apple to make a statement on its website that Samsung tablets had not copied the design of the iPad, and this ruling was upheld on appeal in 2012.

== See also ==
- Apple Inc. litigation
- Smartphone patent wars
- U.S. patent law
- Motorola Mobility v. Apple Inc.
