= Smartphone patent wars =

Litigation between vendors, since 2009

The smartphone wars or smartphone patents licensing and litigation refers to commercial struggles among smartphone manufacturers including Sony Mobile (formerly Sony Ericsson), Google, Apple Inc., Samsung Mobile, Microsoft, Nokia, Motorola, Huawei, LG Electronics, ZTE and HTC, by patent litigation and other means. The conflict is part of the wider "patent wars" between technology and software corporations.

To secure and increase market share, companies that have been granted a patent can sue to prevent competitors from using the methods the patent covers. Since 2010 the number of lawsuits, counter-suits, and trade complaints based on patents and designs in the market for smartphones, and devices based on smartphone OSes such as Android and iOS, has increased significantly.

== Timeline ==
Initial suits, countersuits, rulings, license agreements, and other significant events in italics:

=== 2009 ===
The pattern of suing and countersuing really began in 2009, as demand for smartphones accelerated dramatically with the advent of the modern smartphone, which combined a responsive touchscreen with a modern multitasking operating system. This browser provided full web access and an application store, in the form of the Apple iPhone 3G and the first Android phones.

- 2009, Oct 22: Nokia sues Apple over 10 patents.
- 2009, Dec 11: Apple countersued Nokia over 13 patents.
- 2009, Dec 29: Nokia files a second lawsuit and a U.S. International Trade Commission (ITC) complaint against Apple over 7 more patents.

=== 2010 ===
- 2010, Jan 15: Apple files an ITC complaint against Nokia over 9 patents.
- 2010, Jan 15: Steve Jobs said "I want to destroy Android".
- 2010, Feb 19: Apple drops 4 patents from their countersuit against Nokia that are in their ITC complaint against Nokia.
- 2010, Feb 24: Apple countersues Nokia in Nokia's second lawsuit, over the 9 patents that are in Apple's ITC complaint.
- 2010, Mar 02: Apple sues HTC over 10 patents and files an ITC complaint against HTC over 10 other patents.
- 2010, Apr 26: 5 of the patents in Apple's ITC complaint against Nokia are merged into their ITC complaint against HTC.
- 2010, Apr 27: HTC signs an agreement with Microsoft to license Microsoft patents in return for royalties on HTC's Android-based devices (rumored to be $5 per handset).
- 2010, May 7: Nokia files a third lawsuit against Apple over 5 more patents.
- 2010, May 12: HTC files an ITC complaint against Apple over 5 patents.
- 2010, May 28: S3 Graphics files an ITC complaint against Apple over 4 patents used in the iPhone, iPod Touch, iPad, and Apple computers.
- 2010, Jun 28: Apple countersues Nokia in Nokia's third lawsuit, over 7 more patents.
- 2010, Jul 06: HTC countersues Apple over 3 patents.
- 2010, Jul 21: Nokia drops 1 patent from their ITC complaint against Apple.
- 2010, Aug 12: Oracle sues Google over 7 patents relating to the use of Java in Android. See Oracle v. Google.
- 2010, Sep 17: Nokia adds 2 more patents to their third lawsuit against Apple.
- 2010, Sep 27: Apple sues Nokia in the UK and Germany over 9 patents.
- 2010, Sep 30: Nokia countersues Apple in Germany over 4 patents.
- 2010, Oct 01: Microsoft files an ITC complaint and a lawsuit against Motorola over 9 patents.
- 2010, Oct 06: Motorola sues Apple over 18 patents, and files an ITC complaint against Apple over 6 of them.
- 2010, Oct 08: Motorola files a request for declaratory judgment that they do not infringe 12 Apple patents, and that those patents be declared invalid.
- 2010, Oct 29: Apple sues Motorola over 6 patents, and files an ITC complaint against Motorola over 3 of them.
- 2010, Dec 01: Apple adds the 12 patents to their suit against Motorola that Motorola previously requested a declaratory judgment that they do not infringe.

=== 2011 ===
- 2011, Mar 21: Microsoft sues Barnes & Noble over the Android operating system in the Nook ebook reader.
- 2011, Apr 15: Apple sues Samsung for patent and trademark infringement (7 utility patents, 3 design patents, 3 registered trade dresses, 6 trademarked icons) with its Galaxy line of mobile products, including the Galaxy S smartphone and the Galaxy Tab tablet.
- 2011, Apr 22: Samsung sues Apple in South Korea (5 patents), Japan (2 patents), and Germany (3 patents).
- 2011, Apr 28: Samsung countersues Apple over 10 patents.
- 2011, May 18: Samsung ordered to provide Apple samples of the announced Galaxy S2, Infuse 4G, and Infuse 4G LTE smartphones, as well as the Galaxy Tab 8.9 and Galaxy Tab 10.1 tablets as part of Apple's lawsuit against the company.
- 2011, May 18: Samsung files a court motion for Apple to provide samples of the unannounced iPhone 5 and iPad 3 prototypes.
- 2011, Jun 14: Nokia and Apple settle their litigation with Apple agreeing to pay Nokia an undisclosed one-time payment as well as continuing royalties.
- 2011, Jun 16: Apple amends its lawsuit against Samsung, dropping 2 utility patents and 1 design patent, and adding 3 new utility patents plus 4 trade dress applications, now covering the Samsung Galaxy Tab 10.1.
- 2011, Jun 22: Samsung's motion to be provided samples of Apple's unannounced iPhone 5 and iPad 3 prototypes is denied.
- 2011, Jun 27: General Dynamics Itronix signs an agreement with Microsoft to license Microsoft patents in return for royalties on General Dynamics Itronix's Android-based devices.
- 2011, Jun 29: Velocity Micro signs an agreement with Microsoft to license Microsoft patents in return for royalties on Velocity Micro's Android-based devices.
- 2011, Jun 30: A consortium of companies made up of Apple, EMC Corporation, Ericsson, Microsoft, Research In Motion and Sony win against Google in an auction of over 6,000 Nortel mobile-related telecommunications patents for US$4.5 billion.
- 2011, Jun 30: Onkyo signs an agreement with Microsoft to license Microsoft patents in return for royalties on Onkyo's Android-based devices.
- 2011, Jul 01: Apple files for preliminary injunction against 4 Samsung products: Infuse 4G, Galaxy S 4G, Droid Charge, and Galaxy Tab 10.1 based on 3 design patents and 1 utility patent.
- 2011, Jul 01: ITC rules that Apple infringes on 2 patents held by S3 Graphics, while not infringing on 2 others.
- 2011, Jul 05: Wistron signs an agreement with Microsoft to license Microsoft patents in return for royalties on Wistron's Android-based devices.
- 2011, Jul 06: HTC agrees to purchase S3 Graphics to secure 235 patents for use in its defense against Apple.
- 2011, Jul 06: Microsoft seeks $15 licensing fees from Samsung for a range of claimed patent violations on every Android device.
- 2011, Jul 11: Apple files a second ITC complaint against HTC over 5 more patents, and sues HTC over 4 patents from this second ITC complaint that they weren't already suing HTC over.
- 2011, Jul 11-12: Google acquires 1,029 Patents from IBM for an undisclosed amount.
- 2011, Jul 15: ITC finds HTC infringes on 2 Apple patents.
- 2011, Aug 02: Apple sues Samsung in Australia over 10 patents, resulting in Samsung delaying the launch and halting advertising of the Samsung Galaxy Tab 10.1 tablet in Australia to an indefinite date.
- 2011, Aug 09: A German court issues a preliminary injunction against the Samsung Galaxy Tab 10.1 in Apple's lawsuit against Samsung, which causes its sale to be banned in most of Europe.
- 2011, Aug 15: Google announces its intention to buy Motorola Mobility for US$12.5 billion. Eighteen of Motorola's patents could potentially be used for defense or countersuits against Apple and Microsoft, and may influence the smartphone war. These patents may change the balance of power and force the various players to settle their lawsuits.
- 2011, Aug 16: The Samsung Galaxy Tab 10.1 sales ban in Europe is lifted outside of Germany.
- 2011, Aug 17: Google acquires 1,023 more patents from IBM for an undisclosed amount (not revealed until 13 Sep 2011).
- 2011, Aug 23: Microsoft files a complaint with the ITC requesting a ban on several key Motorola smartphones and devices in the USA based on infringements of 7 patents.
- 2011, Aug 24: A court in the Netherlands rules that Samsung will be banned from selling the Galaxy S, Galaxy S II, and Galaxy Ace in several European countries due to Apple's patent infringement claims.
- 2011, Sep 02: Apple granted a preliminary injunction against Samsung, preventing display of the prototype Samsung Galaxy Tab 7.7 tablet at the IFA trade show in Berlin.
- 2011, Sep 02: Apple court filings assert that Andy Rubin got inspiration for the Android framework while working at Apple before working at General Magic and Danger, Inc.
- 2011, Sep 07: HTC countersues Apple using nine patents from Google. The move is seen as a possible first step for Google, offering direct support in lawsuits involving manufacturers that use Android.
- 2011, Sep 08: Acer and ViewSonic sign patent license agreements with Microsoft regarding their use of Android on smartphones and tablets.
- 2011, Sep 09: Apple's preliminary injunction against sales of the Samsung Galaxy Tab 10.1 in Germany is upheld.
- 2011, Sep 12: Samsung announces a lawsuit against Apple in France that had been filed in July over 3 patents.
- 2011, Sep 12: Apple countersues Samsung in the UK over an unknown number of patents.
- 2011, Sep 13: Google's August 17 acquisition of 1,023 patents from IBM is revealed by the U.S. Patent and Trademark Office.
- 2011, Sep 17: Samsung countersues Apple in Australia over 7 patents.
- 2011, Sep 28: Samsung signs an agreement with Microsoft to license Microsoft patents in return for royalties on Samsung's Android-based devices.
- 2011, Oct 12: An Australian court issues a preliminary injunction against the Samsung Galaxy Tab 10.1 in Apple's lawsuit against Samsung, which prevents its sale in Australia leading up to the 2011 holiday season.
- 2011, Oct 13: Quanta signs an agreement with Microsoft to license Microsoft patents in return for royalties on Quanta's Android and Chrome-based devices.
- 2011, Oct 13: Judge in Apple's U.S. lawsuit against Samsung agrees that Samsung's tablets infringe on Apple's patents, but also that the validity of some of the patents might be questionable.

=== 2012 ===
- 2012, Jan 17: Apple files a lawsuit in Düsseldorf regional court, Germany, against Samsung, claiming the Galaxy S2 infringes on Apple patents.
- 2012, Mar 7: Samsung files a lawsuit in Seoul's Central district court claiming that the iPhone 4S and iPad 2 infringe on three of its patents.
- 2012, Mar 7: Judge Allan Gropper ruled that Apple was disallowed from suing Kodak for patent infringement. arguing that it would be an "inappropriate way forward".
- 2012, May 22: Google Inc. completes acquisition of Motorola Mobility.
- 2012, Jun 10: Apple sues Samsung over its autocorrect patent in San Jose, Calif.
- 2012, Jun 23: Federal Judge Posner throws out Apple-Motorola case with prejudice.
- 2012, Jun 29: Apple is granted an injunction against import of the Samsung Galaxy Tab 10.1.
- 2012, Jun 30: Judge Lucy Koh grants Apple an injunction against the Samsung Galaxy Nexus.
- 2012, Jul 1: Samsung files an appeal against Apple's injunction against the Galaxy Nexus.
- 2012, Jul 2: Nokia claims that the Nexus 7 infringes on its patents.
- 2012, Jul 4: A high court in the UK rules that three of the four patents Apple brought up against HTC are invalid.
- 2012, Jul 6: Google and Samsung are forced to degrade the universal search bar on the Galaxy Nexus and Galaxy S3 as a result of an injunction granted to Apple by Judge Lucy Koh.
- 2012, Jul 6: The ITU announces that it is convening a patent roundtable on October 10 in Geneva to have stakeholders resolve their differences.
- 2012, Jul 9: Samsung wins a patent dispute on the Galaxy Tab against Apple in the UK. Judge Colin Birss stated that Samsung's tablets were "not as cool" as Apple's, and "do not have the same understated and extreme simplicity which is possessed by the Apple design."
- 2012, Jul 12: San Francisco-based EMG Technology sues Google in an East Texas court claiming the mobile version of Chrome infringes on its patent for "apparatus and method of manipulating a region on a wireless device screen for viewing, zooming, and scrolling internet content."
- 2012, Jul 15: RIM is ordered to pay US$147 million to Mformation for infringement of its remote management patent.
- 2012, Jul 18: Apple is granted 'the mother of all smartphone patents' by the USPTO, "encompass[ing] the user interfaces Apple designed for blogging, e-mail, telephone, camera, video player, calendar, browser, widgets, search, notes, maps and most importantly, a multi-touch interface".
- 2012, Jul 18: Apple is forced by UK Judge Birss to publish public apologies to Samsung on their website, stating that Samsung did not copy the iPad.
- 2012, Jul 27: A Mannheim court bans Motorola's Android devices in Germany, ruling that they infringe on Microsoft's FAT patent.
- 2012, Aug 23: A court in Seoul, South Korea, ruled that both Apple and Samsung had infringed each other's patents, and that Samsung had not copied the look and feel of Apple's products.
- 2012, Aug 24: Apple wins patent dispute against Samsung and is awarded $1.049 billion in damages for 6 of the 7 patents brought to bear. Samsung is awarded $0 in counter suit. The jury deliberated for 3 days before coming to a verdict that found among other things that Samsung violated the "scrolling bounce back" patent and "pinch to zoom" patent of Apple.
- 2012, Aug 31: A Tokyo court rules that Samsung's Galaxy smartphones and tablets do not violate an Apple patent on technology that synchronizes music and videos between devices and servers.
- 2012, Oct 11: A U.S. appellate court overturns the sales ban against the Samsung Galaxy Nexus smartphone finding that the district court in California "abused its discretion" in imposing a preliminary injunction on Galaxy Nexus sales and that Apple did not establish cause for a sales ban.
- 2012, Oct 18: The Court of Appeal of England and Wales upheld the High Court Judgement that Samsung's Galaxy Tablet didn't infringe Apple's designs. As part of the ruling, Apple has been instructed to run advertisements in select publications and on its website stating that Samsung didn't copy its tablet designs. This decision is valid throughout the European Union and led Darren Smyth, partner at EIP, to remark, "This will be the end of the line. An appeal to the Supreme Court is in principle possible, but there has been no indication so far that Apple plans such an appeal."
- 2012, Oct 23: In a non-final Office action, the USPTO declares all 20 claims of Apple's rubber-banding patent (U.S. Patent No. 7,469,381) invalid, including claim 19, which Apple successfully asserted against Samsung in the summer trial in California. The claims were rejected on grounds of 'obviousness' and 'lack of novelty'.
- 2012, Nov 5: An Apple lawsuit against Google's Motorola Mobility over alleged patent abuse is thrown out by a US Federal Court.
- 2012, Nov 13: HTC settles with Apple and agrees to pay royalties of an undisclosed sum to Apple Inc.
- 2012, Nov 28: Ericsson, Swedish mobile communication infrastructure manufacturer, sues Samsung over patent infringement on its mobile infrastructure technology in the United States.
- 2012, Dec 7: Preliminary United States Patent and Trademark Office ruling declares the Steve Jobs patent, U.S. Patent No. 7,479,949, invalid on all 20 claims.
- 2012, Dec 13: A US federal jury rules that Apple's iPhone infringed on three mobile device patents belonging to MobileMedia Ideas LLC, a company belonging to Nokia and Sony.
- 2012, Dec 17: Judge Koh denies Apple's motion for permanent injunction against Samsung.
- 2012, Dec 26: Samsung Electronics files a complaint against Ericsson with the United States International Trade Commission (USITC) to ban some Ericsson products from sales in the US.

=== 2013 ===
- 2013, June: ITC rules iPads infringe on Samsung patents.
- 2013, August: ITC ruling from June vetoed, ITC blocks older Samsung phones for violating two Apple patents.
- 2013, Sep 3: Microsoft announced the acquisition of Nokia's phone business (Nokia Devices and Services). Microsoft didn't get the Nokia's patent business (later known as Nokia Technologies).
- 2013, Oct 31: Rockstar Consortium, a consortium owned by companies including Apple and Microsoft, starts legal action against Google, Huawei and Samsung, and other makers of Android phones including Asustek, HTC, LG Electronics, Pantech, and ZTE.
- 2013, December 23: Google initiates legal action against Rockstar Consortium with a countersuit filed in San Jose, California.

=== 2014 ===
- 2014, January: Google sold Motorola Mobility (except the patent business) to Lenovo.
- 2014, February: HTC and Nokia settled all their patent suits, with HTC paying an undisclosed amount to Nokia.
- 2014, March: The $929 million judgment from the US trial Apple vs. Samsung becomes official. Samsung files a formal appeal.

=== 2015 ===
- 14 January: Ericsson sues Apple for breach of contract, seeking a patent-licensing agreement for its mobile technology.
- 9 March: Microsoft sues Kyocera for patent infringement in a U.S. federal court and seeks an import ban on three Android smartphones.

=== 2016 ===
- 18 May: Microsoft sold the feature phone business and the Nokia brand to HMD Global and FIH Mobile.
- 6 December: The SCOTUS decided 8-0 to reverse the decision from the 2012 Apple v. Samsung trial that awarded hundreds of millions to Apple and returned the case to the Federal Circuit court to define the appropriate legal standard to define "article of manufacture" because it is not the smartphone itself, but could be just the case and screen to which the design patents relate.
- 8 July: Case (2016) Yue 03 Min Chu No. 1382 between Samsung and Huawei in China docketed.

=== 2017 ===
- March: IWNCOMM obtain the first SEP injunction in China against Sony.

=== 2018 ===
- 13 April: Samsung obtains an antisuit injunction against Huawei preventing them from enforcing two Chinese SEP injunctions.

=== 2019 ===
- 26 February: Samsung and Huawei submit a motion for stay in the United States Court of Appeals for the Federal Circuit.

=== 2021 ===
- 12 July: Nokia sues OPPO in 4 different countries due to a 4G/5G patent(s)
- 14 September: OPPO countersues Nokia in 9 different countries

== See also ==
- Litigation involving Apple Inc.
- Apple Inc. v. Samsung Electronics Co.
- Google litigation
- Motorola Mobility v. Apple Inc.
- Google LLC v. Oracle America, Inc.
- Microsoft Corp. v. Motorola Inc.
- Samsung v. Huawei
