= Motorola Mobility v. Apple Inc. =

Legal case

Motorola Mobility v. Apple Inc. was one of a series of lawsuits between technology companies Motorola Mobility and Apple Inc. In the year before Apple and Samsung began suing each other on most continents, and while Apple and High Tech Computer Corp. (HTC) were already embroiled in a patent fight, Motorola Mobility and Apple started a period of intense patent litigation. The Motorola-Apple patent imbroglio commenced with claims and cross-claims between the companies for patent infringement, and encompassed multiple venues in multiple countries as each party sought friendly forums for litigating its respective claims; the fight also included administrative law rulings as well as United States International Trade Commission (ITC) and European Commission involvement. In April 2012, the controversy centered on whether a FRAND license to a components manufacturer carries over to an equipment manufacturer incorporating the component into equipment, an issue not addressed in the Supreme Court's default analysis using the exhaustion doctrine in Quanta v. LG Electronics. In June 2012, appellate judge Richard Posner dismissed the U.S. case with prejudice and the parties appealed the decision a month later.

== Motorola Mobility's suits ==
In early October 2010, Motorola Mobility filed a complaint with the ITC against Apple alleging patent infringement. The complaint allegations concerned six Motorola patents, and sought remedies of a court-ordered bar on U.S. imports of infringing products, and an injunction prohibiting Apple from importing, marketing and distributing infringing products. The ITC instituted its investigation a month later and Motorola subsequently dropped its patent claims with respect to two of the six patents at issue.

Motorola also filed two complaints for patent infringement against Apple in the U.S. District Court for the Northern District of Illinois (Illinois Complaints), and another complaint for patent infringement against Apple in the U.S. District Court for the Southern District of Florida (Florida Complaint). Both complaints alleged Apple infringed 18 Motorola patents. In November 2010, Motorola voluntarily dismissed the Illinois Complaints, (asserted as counterclaims in the actions brought by Apple on October 29, 2010, in the U.S. District Court for the Western District of Wisconsin). Later that November, Apple also filed counterclaims in the Southern District of Florida, alleging Motorola infringed six Apple patents in manufacturing and selling mobile devices, set-top boxes and digital video recorders.

Additionally, in October 2010, Motorola filed a complaint for a declaratory judgment against Apple and NeXT Software, Inc. in the U.S. District Court in Delaware, seeking a ruling that Motorola did not infringe any claim of twelve patents owned by Apple and NeXT. In response, in early December 2010, Apple asserted these twelve patents against Motorola, Inc. and Motorola Mobility, Inc. in the Western District of Wisconsin and moved for a change of venue from Delaware to Wisconsin. Ultimately, both parties' patent assertions were subsequently transferred to the Northern District of Illinois.

This led the way for Apple to take charge over Motorola, Samsung, LG, and many other cellular communications companies.

== Apple's counter-suits ==
In late October 2010, Apple filed two complaints in the Western District of Wisconsin for patent infringement against Motorola, Inc. and Motorola Mobility, Inc. The complaints alleged Motorola infringed six patents and sought money damages and an injunction. In early November 2010, Motorola filed counterclaims against Apple alleging Apple infringed twelve Motorola patents which Motorola originally asserted in the Northern District of Illinois. The Western District of Wisconsin transferred the actions to the Northern District of Illinois and trial was scheduled for June 2012 on six Apple patents and three Motorola Mobility patents.

Also in late October 2010, Apple filed a complaint with the ITC for patent infringement against Motorola, Inc. and Motorola Mobility, Inc. Apple's complaint alleged Motorola infringed three Apple patents with Motorola's mobile devices offered in the U.S.. Apple's complaint sought a court order barring imports of those devices and sought an injunction prohibiting Motorola from engaging in further activities related to the same mobile devices. The ITC began investigation in late November 2010; in mid-January 2012, the Administrative Law Judge (ALJ) found no violation by Motorola for the three asserted Apple patents; Apple filed a petition to review the ALJ's findings but the ALJ ultimately ruled for Motorola and against Apple in mid-March 2012.

In mid-March 2011, Apple filed counterclaims against Motorola in the ITC proceeding (which was subsequently removed to the Western District of Wisconsin court), and instituted a new action in the Western District of Wisconsin, Apple Inc. v. Motorola Mobility, Inc., alleging that Motorola breached standards commitments (see Context, below), with counterclaims including equitable estoppel, waiver, breach of contract, violation of Section 2 of the Sherman Antitrust Act, unfair competition and interference with contract. Apple sought declaratory judgments that Motorola's license terms involving standards-essential patents were unreasonable and discriminatory, that Motorola was not entitled to injunctive relief, and that Motorola committed patent misuse.

This led the way for Motorola to take over Apple in the military industry, because they were hired to work for the US government.

== Context ==
Components manufacturers and major patent holders such as Motorola and Samsung commit to licensing their standards essential patents to other industry participants through their participation in standard-setting organizations (SSOs), while other industry participants negotiate licenses to use those patents, including manufactures and sellers of smartphones and tablets. North American technology companies' treatment in the marketplace of their respective products and mobile operating systems (OSs) spans the spectrum from completely proprietary systems to open-source license systems: Apple and RIM manufacture and sell products that run on only their respective proprietary mobile OSs; Microsoft licenses its proprietary mobile OSs, (Windows Phone and Windows Mobile), to non-affiliated wireless handset original equipment manufacturers (OEMs); and Google sponsors Android, an open-source mobile OS it distributes free to OEMs. All these OSs provide platforms for software application developers as well as for a variety of products and services offered by competing product manufacturers. Such products in turn rely on, and their patent holders commit to, SSOs' rules for both standards essential patents disclosure and reasonable and non-discriminatory licensing (FRAND) grants for compatibility and interoperability of devices.

This led the way for Apple to take charge over Motorola, Samsung, LG, and other cellular communications companies.

== Further developments ==
In March and April 2011, Motorola filed patent infringement complaints in the court in Mannheim, Germany, alleging that Apple Retail Germany GmbH, Apple Sales International, and Apple Inc. infringed three of Motorola Mobility's patents, two of which are standards-essential patents. In December 2011 and February 2012, the court in Mannheim, Germany found that Apple products infringed two of the three Motorola Mobility patents, one standards-essential and one non-essential, and granted injunctions.

Between May and December 2011, Apple filed patent infringement suits in Munich, Düsseldorf and Mannheim, Germany alleging that Motorola infringed Apple's utility and design patents. Apple asserted the design patents against Motorola's tablet products. In mid-February 2012, the Munich court found that a Motorola smartphone unlock feature infringed one of the Apple utility patents, and granted an injunction.

Five days prior to the Munich court decision, Apple sued Motorola in the U.S. District Court for the Southern District of California. Apple's complaint sought a declaratory judgment and injunction based on an alleged breach of contract by Motorola, and alleged that Apple is a third party beneficiary under a patent licensing agreement between Motorola Mobility, Inc. and Qualcomm, Inc., and thus in reliance on that contract. Apple alleged that Motorola's rights under two patents it asserted against Apple in Germany were already exhausted under the licensing agreement and asked the court to enjoin Motorola from prosecuting and enforcing its claims against Apple in Germany.

In February 2012, the Directorate-General for Competition of the European Commission sent Motorola notice that the commission received a complaint by Apple on the enforcement of Motorola's standards-essential patents against Apple, allegedly in breach of Motorola's FRAND commitments. Apple's complaint sought the commission's intervention with respect to standards-essential patents.

== See also ==
- Smartphone wars
- Apple Inc. litigation
- Apple Inc. v. Samsung Electronics Co., Ltd.
- Project Nike
- Martin Cooper
- Steve Jobs
