= Microsoft Corp. v. Motorola Inc. =

United States court case about software licensing

Microsoft Corp. v. Motorola, Inc.
- Court: United States Court of Appeals for the Ninth Circuit
- Full case name: Microsoft Corp. v. Motorola, Inc., Motorola Mobility, Inc., and Gen. Instrument Corp.
- Argued: September 11 2012
- Decided: September 28 2012
- Citations: 696 F.3d 872; 104 U.S.P.Q.2d 2000; 12 Cal. Daily Op. Serv. 11, 223; 2012 Daily Journal D.A.R. 13, 619

Case history
- Prior history: 2:10-cv-01823-JLR, 871 F. Supp. 2d 1089 (W.D. Wash. 2012)

Holding
- Temporary anti-suit injunction upheld on interlocutory appeal

Court membership
- Judges sitting: Marsha Berzon, John Clifford Wallace, Sidney R. Thomas

Case opinions
- Majority: Berzon

Microsoft Corp. v. Motorola Inc., 696 F.3d 872 (9th Cir. 2012) was a United States Court of Appeals for the Ninth Circuit case about Reasonable and Non-Discriminatory (RAND) Licensing and foreign anti-suit injunction.

The case was originally filed by Microsoft against Motorola in the Western District Court of Washington on November 9, 2010, claiming that Motorola had violated its reasonable and non-discriminatory licensing agreement to which Microsoft was a third-party beneficiary. The district court ruled that a company's agreement with a standards organization to provide Reasonable and non-discriminatory (RAND) terms of licensing to all other parties constitutes a contract that is enforceable by third parties.

While the U.S. domestic contract litigation had been proceeding, Motorola sued Microsoft in Germany for patent infringement in July 2011. The German district court granted Motorola an injunction prohibiting Microsoft from selling allegedly infringing products in Germany based on German patent law. Then, Microsoft sought an anti-suit injunction against an injunction of patent infringement in Germany.

The district court granted Microsoft an anti-suit injunction that prevented Motorola from enforcing a foreign patent infringement injunction that Motorola had obtained against Microsoft in Germany. After granting to Microsoft this preliminary injunction, the case was brought to the Appellate court in an interlocutory appeal by Motorola. The Ninth Circuit Court of Appeals reviewed the district court's foreign anti-suit injunction for abuse of discretion, and affirmed the District Court's decision.

== Background ==
Motorola was the holder of patents that were deemed essential to the 802.11 and H.264 industry standards, meaning that it would be necessary to use the ideas embodied in these patents if one were to create a device that would meet these standards. Many standards setting organizations, to reduce the possibility of the patent holdup and increase competition, asked that the holders of any standard-essential patents agree to license these patents on a fair, non-restrictive basis. Motorola had indicated its willingness to license these patents on RAND terms on a worldwide, non-discriminatory basis in letters to both the Institute of Electrical and Electronics Engineers (IEEE) and International Telecommunication Union (ITU). Microsoft had several products that utilized these standards, most notably the Xbox 360 and personal computers running Microsoft Windows.

On October 21 and 29, 2010 Motorola sent letters to Microsoft offering to license its standards-essential patents for the 802.11 and H.264 standards respectively. The offer asked for a 2.25% royalty rate on the price of all end products Microsoft sold utilizing the technologies protected by these patents. Microsoft regarded these terms as blatantly unreasonable and responded by filing a breach of contract case against Motorola, claiming that Motorola had violated its agreement with the IEEE and ITU to provide reasonable and non-discriminatory terms of licensing to all potential licensees on a global scale.

In July 2011, Motorola responded by filing patent infringement cases against Microsoft in Germany for many products that employed the standards owned by Motorola. Motorola's RAND contracts were directly between Motorola and a standard-setting organization; Microsoft as a third party was not recognized as an involved party by German patent law.

On the other hand, in the U.S., on February 27, 2012, the Western District Court of Washington held that Motorola's letters of assurance to the IEEE and ITU which stated that Motorola would provide RAND terms on a global basis to all potential licensees established a contract between Motorola and the standards-setting organizations. Additionally, because the language of the contract did not indicate adding conditions to be eligible for RAND terms, Motorola's claims that a licensee would have to negotiate to be eligible for RAND terms were disregarded. On March 28, 2012, Microsoft moved the district court for a temporary restraining order and preliminary injunction to enjoin Motorola from enforcing any German injunctive relief it might obtain.

On May 2, 2012, Motorola won its case in Germany and obtained an injunction against Microsoft's selling infringing products in Germany. The German injunction was not self-enforcing; to enforce the judgment, Motorola would need to pay a security bond to cover Microsoft's potential damages, should the infringement ruling be reversed on appeal.

== Court proceedings ==
=== Plaintiff's claims ===
Microsoft claimed that Motorola's licensing offers breached its agreement to provide reasonable and non-discriminatory terms to all potential licensees. Microsoft contended that the 2.25% royalty rate was blatantly unreasonable and that a royalty rate based on the final products' price was unfair for products that were not centered around incorporating the relevant standards. If Motorola initially offered blatantly unreasonable terms—irrespective of whatever terms were eventually agreed upon—then it would be acting in bad faith with regards to its obligation to provide reasonable terms of licensing on a non-discriminatory basis and breaching its contracts with the IEEE and ITU.

==== Preliminary injunction motion ====
Microsoft sought for anti-suit injunction arguing that the injunctive relief in Germany was inappropriate because:

- Motorola's October 21 and 29 letters sought monetary payments for a worldwide license to Motorola's patents related to the 802.11 and H.264 standards demonstrated that monetary relief would suffice as an alternative remedy to an injunction.
- Microsoft sought to obtain a license for Motorola's patents, was entitled to a RAND license as a third-party beneficiary, and such a RAND licensing arrangement would eventually take place between the parties either through negotiation or by the court setting the terms.

=== Defendant's claims ===
In the original suit, Motorola defended that its terms were reasonable, as they were the standard terms of licensing that many other licensees had agreed to. Additionally, Motorola argued that its agreement to provide RAND terms was contingent upon a licensee contacting Motorola and negotiating terms of a license, while Microsoft's interpretation was that all potential licensees were granted RAND terms by default. Because Microsoft had failed these conditions necessary to be eligible for RAND licensing terms, Motorola claimed that it was not under any obligations to give RAND terms and thus could not have breached any contract.

==== Defense against preliminary injunction motion ====
Against Microsoft's motion for a preliminary anti-suit injunction, Motorola maintained as follows:

- It was improper that the court determined the RAND rate at least before the patent licenser and licensee had failed to produce a rate with good-faith bargaining.
- The German litigation couldn't be described as "vexatious" because the German court had ruled in Motorola's favor.
- The anti-suit injunction offends comity intolerably because its German patent claims have merit under German law, and because German courts, which had different legal opinions from the U.S. court, did not interpret the RAND commitment to creating a contract with third parties.
- The anti-suit injunction had disabled Motorola from enforcing its German patents in the only forum in which the patents can be enforced.

=== Court ruling ===
==== The District Court ====
On May 14, 2012, the district court granted Microsoft the anti-suit injunction in Germany, along with the anti-suit injunction framework from E. & J. Gallo Winery v. Andina Licores S.A., 446 F.3d 984 and Applied Medical v. The Surgical Company, 587 F.3d 909, which included three factors:

- Whether or not the parties and the issues are the same in both the domestic and foreign actions, and whether the first action is dispositive of the action to be enjoined.
- Whether the foreign litigation would (1) frustrate a policy of the forum issuing the injunction; (2) be vexatious or oppressive; (3) threaten the issuing court's jurisdiction over things (such as property); or (4) where the proceedings prejudice other equitable considerations.
- Whether the injunction's impact on comity is tolerable.

Along with the framework, the court held as follows:

- The case on the contract, including Motorola's RAND commitment to ITU, at U.S. court, would be dispositive of the German court's decision. The district court found that Microsoft's contract-based claims would encompass the patent case and injunctive relief in Germany.
- Judging from the timing of the filing in Germany and the circumstances that Motorola claimed over only two of the amount of a hundred of its standard-essential patents, Motorola's German litigation raised the concern of forum shopping and vexatious or oppressive effect on Microsoft. Moreover, the district court concluded that Motorola's action had frustrated the district court's ability to properly adjudicate the contract lawsuit.
- The anti-suit injunction's impact on comity would be tolerable because the German action was filed after the U.S. action, the scope of the anti-suit injunction did not affect Motorola's legal except for the injunctive relief of the alleged patent infringement, and U.S. court had a strong interest in the case because both companies were U.S. based and disputed on the contract which took place within the U.S.

==== The Ninth Circuit ====
The ninth circuit adopted the same framework, and reviewed the district court's decision for abuse of discretion. On September 28, 2012, after reciting the factual and procedural history of the parties' lawsuits in the U.S. and Germany, the court reaffirmed Microsoft's anti-suit injunction claim, stopping Motorola from preventing sales of many Microsoft products in Germany. In its holding, the court discussed each of Motorola's arguments above, and rejected them as follows:

- An injunction banning sales was not the only remedy consistent with the contractual commitment to license users of ITU standard-essential patents.
- Litigation still might be "vexatious" even if there were some merit. Motorola's action was able to be interpreted as a maneuver by the district court.
- The mere fact that different jurisdictions answered the same legal question differently did not generate an intolerable comity problem.
- The scope of the anti-suit injunction was on only the injunctive remedies that Motorola had obtained in Germany, and Motorola was able to continue litigating its German patent except for its granted injunction.

As the anti-suit injunction was only meant to stop Microsoft from suffering damages while the case was decided, it was only in effect until a final decision was made and only stopped Motorola from enforcing the injunction from the German patent infringement case. After the ninth circuit reaffirmed that the anti-suit injunction was within the court's jurisdiction and necessary to protect Microsoft, the entire case was then returned to the district court to be concluded.

== Following proceedings and impact ==
In the district court, Motorola's letters of assurance to the IEEE and ITU were seen as forming a contract that stated that Motorola would eventually have RAND terms of licensing with its licensees. The contract made no guarantee that any initial offers to license would include RAND terms; however, if Motorola were to offer blatantly unreasonable terms then it would act in bad faith by not wanting to eventually reach RAND terms with its licensees. As the qualifications for RAND terms is inherently different from company to company, the court made no immediate decision as to whether or not Motorola's initial offer was blatantly unreasonable and a breach of contract. The court did rule that Motorola was prohibited from further action against Microsoft based on patent infringement related to the 802.11 and H.264 standards, and that Microsoft and Motorola were to reach an agreement on RAND terms for licensing the same patents. Subsequently, Microsoft and Motorola filed several claims and counterclaims on the same issue, with Microsoft claiming that Motorola had offered blatantly unreasonable terms and Motorola claiming that its offer was reasonable. As of September 4, 2013, Microsoft won its claims that Motorola's requested royalties were unreasonable and won approximately $14.5 million in damages.

Several subsequent cases cited Microsoft v. Motorola as precedent that an agreement with a standard-setting organization to provide RAND terms to licensees constituted a contract, and that patent-infringement injunctions should be avoided in favor of negotiating a RAND licensing agreement.

== See also ==
- Patent ambush
- Reasonable and non-discriminatory licensing
- Conflict of laws
- Smartphone patent wars
