= Samsung v. Huawei =

In 2011, Huawei and Samsung began negotiating cross-licenses for their patent portfolios, which includes SEPs.

Because both parties are SEP holders, they had mutual obligations to offer each other FRAND licenses. However, they failed to reach an agreement after years of negotiating. Having reached a deadlock, Huawei filed lawsuits against Samsung in the US on 24 May 2016 and China on 25 May 2016. In retaliation, Samsung filed lawsuits against Huawei in the US and China, along with various counterclaims and requests for patent invalidations. As of 13 April 2018, the parties were involved in 42 patent infringement actions in China.

== Timeline ==
2011

- Negotiations begin.

2018

- 4 January: Judgement issued by Shenzhen Intermediate Peoples' Court granting an injunction against Samsung. The US District Court of Northern California have stated this date to be 11 January 2018 based on Xie Decl. ¶ 7; Jan. 11, 2018 Shenzhen Court Civil Judgment, certified translation (“Shenzhen Order”)(Stake Decl. ¶ 37, id., Ex. 36, Dkt. No. 277-5[under seal]).
- 26 January: Samsung files a notice of appeal at the Shenzhen Intermediate People's Court.
- 1 February: Samsung files a motion for an antisuit injunction in the US District Court of Northern California.
- 13 April: Antisuit injunction granted in favour of Samsung by Judge William H. Orrick.

2019

- A joint motion for stay is lodged in Case 16-cv-02787-WHO.

== Case (2016) Yue 03 Min Chu No. 1382, Shenzhen Intermediate People’s Court ==
On 4 January 2018, the Shenzhen Intermediate People's Court issued a judgment which was not made available to the public due to confidentiality to the parties. On 21 March 2018, the Court released a non-confidential version of its judgment to the public. The judgement was broadcast live.

=== Injunction ===
The court held that because in their view Samsung had maliciously delayed negotiations it had more fault in the negotiations. The court also found that Huawei's owned a patent is a 4G LTE SEP and that Samsung had infringed Huawei's SEP. Because of this the court granted an injunction against Samsung and ordered Samsung to cease infringement.

== Case 16-cv-02787-WHO, U.S. District Court for the Northern District of California ==
Samsung Answer to Complaint

=== Antisuit Injunction ===
Judge Orrick applied the following legal standards in his determination of whether an antisuit injunction should be granted:

“A federal district court with jurisdiction over the parties has the power to enjoin them from proceeding with an action in the courts of a foreign country, although the power should be ‘used sparingly.’” Seattle Totems Hockey Club, Inc. v. Nat'l Hockey League, 652 F.2d 852, 855 (9th Cir. 1981). “Such injunctions allow the court to restrain a party subject to its jurisdiction from proceeding in a foreign court in circumstances that are unjust.” E. & J. Gallo Winery v. Andina Licores S.A., 446 F.3d 984, 989 (9th Cir. 2006)(“Gallo”). The Ninth Circuit employs “a three-part inquiry for assessing the propriety of such an injunction.” Microsoft Corp. v. Motorola, Inc., 696 F.3d 872, 881 (9th Cir. 2012)(“Microsoft II”); see also Gallo, 446 F.3d at 990 (establishing framework for determining whether to issue anti-suit injunction). First, we determine whether or not the parties and the issues are the same in both the domestic and foreign actions, and whether or not the first action is dispositive of the action to be enjoined. Second, we determine whether at least one of the so-called Unterweser factors applies. Finally, we assess whether the injunction’s impact on comity is tolerable. Microsoft II, 696 F.3d at 881 (citations and internal quotation marks omitted); see id. at 882 7 1 2 3 4 5 6 7 8 9 10 11 12 13 14 15 16 17 18 19 20 21 22 23 24 25 26 27 28 United States District Court Northern District of California (referring to three-part inquiry as the “Gallo framework”).

After a review of the facts and circumstances in light of the law, Judge Orrick decided:

“In accordance with the foregoing, Samsung’s motion to enjoin Huawei from enforcing the injunction orders issued by the Shenzhen court is GRANTED. Huawei should not seek to enforce those orders until I have the ability to determine the breach of contract claim it chose to present in this action prior to filing the Chinese actions”

Scott Graham use the headline “Judge Blocks Huawei's Chinese Injunctions Against Samsung”. Strictly speaking that headline is inaccurate as the US anti-suit injunction only prevents Huawei from enforcing the Chinese judgment. It does not affect the judgment of the Chinese court in any way.
