= Chirp (service) =

Book discovery service

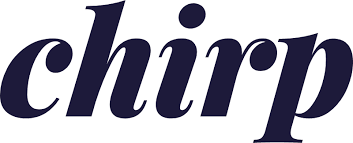
- Company type: Private
- Founded: 2019
- Industry: Publishing; Audiobooks
- Website: https://www.chirpbooks.com

Chirp is a U.S. based audiobook retail service. It allows users to and stream audiobooks directly from the website or in the app, and is an a la carte retailer, not a subscription based model. The company does not rely on monthly subscriptions and provides discounted prices to its users.

As of May 2021, Chirp is available in the United States and Canada. Chirp audiobooks can be accessed via the Chirp app and can be used on Android or iOS.

Chirp's parent company, Pubmark Inc., is headquartered in Cambridge, Massachusetts.

== History ==
Chirp was launched in 2019, and is owned and operated by the founders of BookBub, an online book discovery service. Built in Boston named BookBub and Chirp one of its 21 Boston companies to watch in 2021.
