= BookBub =

Book discovery service

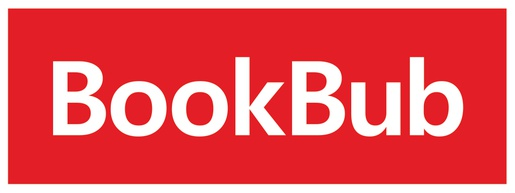
- Company type: Private
- Founded: January 2012; 14 years ago
- Headquarters: Cambridge, Massachusetts
- Founders: Josh Schanker; Nicholas Ciarelli
- Industry: Publishing; E-books; Audiobooks
- Employees: 120
- Website: bookbub.com
- Registration: Optional
- Users: 15 million

BookBub is a book discovery service that was created to help readers find new books and authors. The company features free and discounted ebooks selected by its editorial team, as well as book recommendations, updates from authors, and articles about books. The service is free for readers and includes a website and personalized email newsletters. The Guardian called BookBub the “Groupon of e-books.”

BookBub has millions of users in the United States, United Kingdom, Canada, and Australia. For publishers and authors, BookBub provides marketing tools that are intended to help them reach readers and sell more books. The company also operates an audiobook retailer called Chirp and a website-builder for authors, Author Websites.

The company is headquartered in Cambridge, Massachusetts.

== History ==
BookBub was founded in January 2012 by Josh Schanker and Nicholas Ciarelli.

In May 2014, BookBub raised $3.8 million in a Series A round led by NextView Ventures and Founder Collective, and joined by Avalon Ventures and Bloomberg Beta.

In September 2014, BookBub launched in the UK.

In May 2015, BookBub raised $7 million in new equity and debt financing from its existing investors.

In 2019, BookBub had 120 employees, tens of millions of subscribers, and launched an audiobook division called Chirp.

== Business model ==
The newsletter is free to customers, but authors and publishers pay to be featured in the newsletter. Authors and publishers use BookBub to gain exposure with the intention to increase future sales. The cost to have a book featured depends on the genre and price of the book. In 2014, the cheapest slot was $40 to advertise a free book of African-American interest. BookBub rejects about 80 to 90 percent of requests for eBooks to be featured.
