= Nicholas Ciarelli =

American journalist

Nicholas M. Ciarelli (born September 5, 1986) is an American journalist and was Editor-In-Chief of Think Secret, a website he started in 1999 at the age of thirteen and ceased publishing on December 20, 2007 after reaching a settlement with Apple. Prior to January 2005, although his identity was widely known within the Mac journalism world, Ciarelli was known publicly only by the pen name "Nick dePlume" (a pun on "Nom de Plume", a term of Victorian English coinage, mimicking French, meaning "pen name") that he used on his website. When news spread that Apple Computer had filed a lawsuit against Think Secret, followers of the Mac rumors community began to wonder who 'dePlume' actually was. On January 10, 2005, the night before the Macworld Conference & Expo, a blogger posted an article revealing dePlume as an undergraduate at Harvard University, where he was a reporter for The Harvard Crimson. Two days later, The Harvard Crimson covered the story of Nick Ciarelli, one of the paper's own news editors.

The Wall Street Journal has called Think Secret "one of the most influential Web sites" about Apple. Ciarelli's ongoing legal battle with Apple has been covered by The New York Times, The Washington Post, The Boston Globe, and the Associated Press, among other news outlets.

Ciarelli grew up and attended public school in Cazenovia, NY, where he excelled in academics, achieving salutatorian upon graduation. Ciarelli was an active participant in the stage crew for the high school musical and could often be found in the A/V room broadcasting on the school's closed-circuit television network.

Ronald Luteran, Ciarelli's high school math teacher and a longtime family friend, called his former student an "extraordinary kid with a very good sense of humor." He said the boy was an avid reader by age 5, an accomplished pianist and a keen Mac fan.

Ciarelli was a contributor to The Daily Beast, the current affairs magazine site launched by former Vanity Fair editor Tina Brown.

In 2012, Ciarelli and Josh Schanker co-founded BookBub, an ebook discovery service for readers, headquartered in Cambridge, Massachusetts
