= Patent ambush =

A patent ambush occurs when a member of a standard-setting organization, while participating in development and setting a standard, withholds information about a patent that they or their company owns, has pending, or intends to file (and which is relevant to the standard), and the company subsequently asserts that it is infringed by use of the standard as adopted.

Standards-setting organizations, such as the IEEE and ANSI, typically require each member of their standard-setting committees to file letters with them that either deny knowledge of company patents that are relevant to the standard, or identify the patents they do know about. When an organization is advised of relevant patents, it will often either seek to use a different technology for the standard, or obtain a commitment from the patent owner that it will license users of the standard on fair reasonable and non-discriminatory (FRAND) terms.

Once the proposed standard has been adopted, companies wishing to implement the standard may be forced to pay substantial royalties to the patent holder, creating barriers to entry that distort competition within the market. Consequently, the practice has been considered to be in breach of antitrust or competition law in the United States and the European Union and has resulted in several lawsuits and other actions.

In the United States, a patent ambush may involve the filing of a continuation application with claims targeting a standard or the exploitation of a submarine patent, that is, a patent application which has been filed but has not yet been made public years after the filing.

== See also ==
- Essential patent, a patent which is essential for implementing e.g. a standard
- Patent misuse
- Patent thicket
