= Orange-Book-Standard =

German court decision

Orange-Book-Standard (Az. KZR 39/06) is a decision issued on May 6, 2009 by the Federal Court of Justice of Germany (German: Bundesgerichtshof, BGH) on the interaction between patent law and technical standards, and more generally between intellectual property law and competition law. The Court held that a defendant, accused of patent infringement and who was not able to obtain a license from the patentee, may defend himself, under certain conditions, by invoking an abuse of a dominant market position.

The name "Orange-Book-Standard" comes from the Orange Book that contained the format specifications for CD-Rs, the technology at issue in the case that led to the Orange-Book-Standard decision.

== See also ==
- Essential patent
- European Union competition law
- Rainbow Books, the collection of standards defining the formats of Compact Discs, including the Orange Book standard
- Reasonable and non-discriminatory licensing (RAND)
