= Proview International Holdings =

Chinese manufacturer of computer monitors

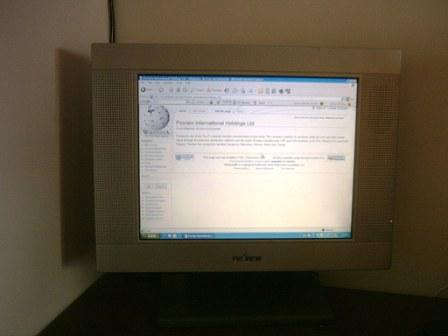
A Proview CRT monitor

Proview International Holdings Ltd (SEHK: 334; Chinese: 唯冠) was a Hong Kong–based manufacturer of computer monitors and other media devices. The company marketed its products under its own and other brand names through its extensive distribution network over the world. Proview manufactured CRT and LCD monitors, LCD TVs, plasma TVs and DVD players. Proview had production facilities located in Shenzhen and Wuhan in China, as well as in Brazil and Taiwan.

Proview held the "iPad" trademark for China and sued Apple for US$1.6 billion in damages. Apple countered that the suit was a shakedown to prop up the company due to its significant debt and impending collapse. Apple ended the dispute with a $60 million payment to Proview.

Proview has been delisted from the stock market and the surviving group have not been able to return to business as of May 2023. Their website is no longer online.
