= Patent war =

Battle to secure patents for litigation

A patent war is a competition or rivalry between corporations or individuals to secure patents for litigation, whether offensively or defensively. There are ongoing patent wars between the world's largest technology and software corporations. Contemporary patent wars are a global phenomenon, fought by multinational corporations based in the United States, China, Europe, Japan, Korea and Taiwan. Patent wars have occurred in a wide range of technologies, both in the past and in the present.

== History ==
Patent wars are not a new phenomenon. In the Wright brothers patent war, the Wright brothers, attributed with the invention of the airplane, sought to prevent competitors from manufacturing airplanes through litigation, stifling the development of the American airline industry. Alexander Graham Bell, credited with inventing the telephone, was dragged into a patent war against his rivals, which involved, in just 11 years, 600 lawsuits. One notable case was Bell's lawsuit against Western Union. Western Union was backed by Elisha Gray, also credited with inventing the telephone.

The occurrence of patent wars has been shaped by the digital age, as the rapid pace of innovation makes much of the patent system obsolete. In the 1980s, technology corporations in the United States and Japan engaged in a patent war, creating a scenario where companies were forced to "fight patent with patent." This bilateral patent war, partly exaggerated by the media, subsided by the mid 1990s.

Exacerbating the frequency of patent wars was the advent of patent trolling. The term "patent troll" was coined in the 1990s by the employees of Intel and popularized by Intel's Peter Detkin. According to Detkin, Intel was "sued for libel for the use of the term 'patent extortionists' so I came up with 'patent trolls...a patent troll is somebody who tries to make a lot of money off a patent that they are not practicing and have no intention of practicing and in most cases never practiced."

During the 1990s, federal courts began reversing earlier decisions made by the patent office that restricted the patenting of software. In 1997, software companies Trend Micro, Integralis, McAfee and Symantec fought a patent war over antivirus software. In 1999, a patent for "one-click ordering technology" led to a patent war between Amazon.com and Barnes & Noble. In 2004, Sony and Kodak engaged in a patent war over digital cameras, a dispute which lasted until 2007.

The current smartphone wars started in the late 2000s. According to PC Magazine, Apple brought the patent wars to the smartphone market by its desire to "go thermonuclear war" on Google's competing Android operating system for mobile devices. This triggered a "war" between major technology companies in the mobile market. Apple has been accused of having links to the company Digitude Innovations, which has been labeled as a patent troll.

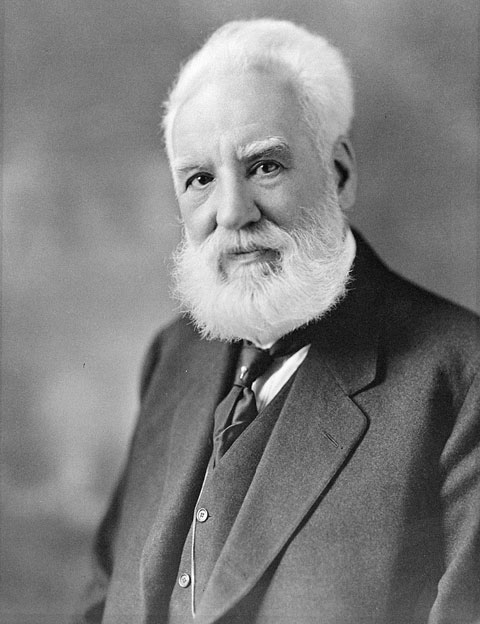
Alexander Graham Bell was involved in a patent war over the invention of the telephone.

== Effects and response ==
Patents are intended to protect intellectual property and encourage innovation, granting innovative companies a temporary competitive advantage over their rivals; however, patents have been used offensively through threats of litigation. This forces companies to allocate time and money that could have been better spent on research and development. Businessweek has written that "only lawyers win in patent wars."

There are numerous proposals aimed at reducing the risk of patent wars. Twitter announced in 2012 an "Innovator's Patent Agreement" promising not to use its patents opportunistically and without the consent of the company's employees. There have been commentators favoring abolishing patents entirely, outside of the industries that require them.
