= VirnetX =

Company described as a patent troll

- Traded as: NYSE: VHC; Russell 2000 Component
- Founded: 1 January 2005
- Headquarters: 308 Dorla Court, Suite 206 Zephyr Cove, Nevada
- Key people: Kendall Larsen (CEO)
- Number of employees: 20
- Subsidiaries: National Research Corporation - Japan, Ltd. VirnetX Inc.

VirnetX (NYSE: VHC) is a publicly traded Internet security software and technology company based in Zephyr Cove, Nevada. Founded in 2005, its patent portfolio includes U.S. and international patents in areas such as DNS and network communication.

Since 2010, VirnetX has been in patent licensing and intellectual property litigation with companies, including Apple, Cisco, and Microsoft.

== History ==
Robert Dunham Short and Victor Larson co-invented a protocol in 1998 that encrypts real-time audio and video transmissions, which was then sought by Apple for their FaceTime app.

In 1999, Dr. Short, Edward Munger, Vic Larson, and Mike Williamson invented a protocol to automatically create hidden Internet connections using DNS.

In December 2002, Short, Munger, Larson, Williamson, and Douglas Schmidt invented a method for assigning unique IP addresses to form secure connections with biometric verification.

VirnetX was incorporated in 2005.

In 2007, Short became Chief Scientist, and the company went public on the American Stock Exchange in December of that year.

In May 2010, Microsoft and VirnetX settled patent disputes for $200M. The following month, Short took over as Chief Technology Officer (CTO).

In 2014, Microsoft and VirnetX settled patent disputes over Skype technology for $23 million. In their Apple case, VirnetX worked together with SAIC, and was awarded $368 million in damages for FaceTime infringement. That ruling was partially vacated in August 2014, but two patents were confirmed to be infringed by the United States Court of Appeals for the Federal Circuit.

In December 2014, VirnetX opened access to their Gabriel platform, which builds upon their patents, and is implemented as small to medium-sized business enterprise collaboration software.

In February 2016, an East Texas jury unanimously ruled in federal court that Apple had willfully violated 13 VirnetX patents. The jury said Apple must pay VirnetX $625.6 million for infringing four of the patents, and the court was considering ongoing royalty rates and punitive damages. The first retrial, conducted from September 26 to September 30, 2016, resulted in another unanimous jury verdict for VirnetX. The verdict re-affirmed patent violations enabling FaceTime and iMessage and awarded $439.7 million to VirnetX. The remaining two patents were tried separately.

In 2018, Apple was ordered to pay $502.6 million to VirnetX. That order was vacated in 2019, but Apple was still found by the jury to be infringing two patents. In February 2020, the U.S. Supreme Court did not consider an appeal made by Apple. The jury awarded VirnetX $502.8 million in 2020 after a separate jury determined that Apple's iPhones and iPads infringed patents related to virtual private networks. Apple's request for a new trial was overturned in January 2021.

In July 2020, VirnetX transferred the listing of its common stock from NYSE American to the New York Stock Exchange (NYSE).

Victor Larson was appointed as CTO in 2021. In March 2021, the patent and trial appeal board ruled that two of VirnetX's patents were invalid in its dispute with Apple.

VirnetX Matrix, which secures private access to Internet applications and infrastructure, and War Room, a security video conferencing product, were both launched in 2022.

In March 2023, the city of Bridgeport, West Virginia, deployed VirnetX's Matrix to secure internet-based applications and infrastructure after the city experienced a ransomware attack. On March 31, 2023, the U.S. Court of Appeals for the Federal Circuit overturned the 2018 verdict following the U.S. Patent Trial and Appeal Board's cancellation of the patents that VirnetX had accused Apple of infringing.

VirnetX announced a partnership with Samsung in May 2023 to resell Samsung's digital display products, including the Samsung Interactive Pro, for hybrid workspaces using the VirnetX One family suite, including War Room and VirnetX Matrix.

In March 2024, VirnetX and Samsung announced an extension of their partnership, working together to provide technology to scientifically document and analyze unidentified aerial phenomena for History Channel’s The Secret of Skinwalker Ranch.

== Products ==
VirnetX has developed products including VirnetX One, War Room, VirnetX Matrix and Gabriel Connection Technology.

VirnetX One is a secure communication platform which utilizes Zero Trust Network Access (ZTNA) to enable private, encrypted networks between user and devices. The VirnetX One Security Platform secures HTTPS, HTTP, RDP, VNC, and SSH. VirnetX One is cross-platform and runs on Microsoft Windows, Mac, iOS, Android and Linux.

War Room is a security product which validates and certifies access to select users, securing domains and authenticated devices prior to enabling access to a secure video conferencing platform. The product is backed by over 194 patents to protect critical data.

Launched in 2022, VirnetX Matrix was originally designed to protect and secure communications for the United States Intelligence Community. VirnetX’s Secure Domain Name Technology removes users’ public internet communications from the public domain, making applications protected by VirnetX Matrix only visible and accessible to authorized users and their authenticated devices

Gabriel Connection Technology facilitates communications on Internet-based applications, such as instant messaging, Voice over IP, and file transfers, using secure domain names.
