= Think Secret =

1998–2008 website specializing in Apple Inc. information

- Website type: News
- Available in: English
- Website: thinksecret.com
- Launched: 1998
- Current status: Offline

Think Secret, founded in 1998, was a web site which specialized in publishing reports and rumors about Apple Inc. The name of the site was a play on Apple's one-time advertising slogan, "Think Different". Think Secret's archives reached as far back as May 3, 1999. On December 20, 2007, it was announced that the site would eventually shut down as part of a legal settlement. The site officially shut down on February 14, 2008, and now shows the statement "The publication Think Secret is no longer in operation." when trying to access it.

== Predicted Mac Mini release ==
In December 2004, Think Secret published rumors of a new Mac and a new piece of word-processing software.

== Apple files suit ==
Apple subsequently sued Think Secret editor "Nick dePlume", claiming that the site's reports violated trade secret law. The rumors were confirmed on January 11, 2005, at Macworld in San Francisco when Apple's CEO Steve Jobs introduced the Mac mini and the iWork productivity suite.

== Editor identified ==
Prior to Think Secret's legal troubles, the identity of its editor was unknown outside the Mac journalism community, as he had always written under the pen-name "Nick dePlume". It was later discovered by bloggers at Black Vortex that he was Nicholas Ciarelli.

== Suit settled, site to discontinue publishing ==
The lawsuit with Apple was settled on December 20, 2007. The site said that, "as part of the confidential settlement, no sources were revealed and Think Secret will no longer be published." Think Secret was officially shut down on February 14, 2008, giving a Forbidden error upon entering the site.

== See also ==
- Apple community
