= Samsung Galaxy S 4G LTE =

Android smartphone model

- Manufacturer: Samsung Electronics
- Type: Touchscreen smartphone
- Series: Galaxy
- First released: United States May 14, 2011 (Verizon Wireless)
- Related: Samsung Galaxy S
- Compatible networks: Dual band CDMA2000; EV-DO Rev. A 800/1900 MHz; LTE 750 MHz
- Form factor: Slate
- Dimensions: 122.4 mm (4.82 in) H 64.2 mm (2.53 in) W 9.9–14 mm (0.39–0.55 in) D.
- Operating system: Android 2.2.1 with TouchWiz 3.0, upgradeable to 2.3.6 Gingerbread
- CPU: Samsung Hummingbird S5PC110 (ARM Cortex A8), 1 GHz
- GPU: PowerVR SGX 540
- Memory: 512 MB
- Storage: 2 GB Internal
- Removable storage: micro-SD 32 GB Preinstalled (up to 32 GB supported)
- Battery: Li-Po 1600 mAh
- Rear camera: 8 megapixel with auto focus; 720p HD video; self-, action, panorama, and smile shot; stop motion; add me Front-facing camera (some models)
- Display: 4.3-inch (110 mm) Super AMOLED Plus; 480x800 px (217 ppi)
- Connectivity: Wi-Fi (802.11b/g/n); Bluetooth 3.0; USB 2.0, DLNA
- Data inputs: Multi-touch display, 6-axis Accelerometer, 3-axis gyroscope, digital compass, proximity and light sensors, and Swype
- Hearing aid compatibility: M4/T4
- Other: TV out, integrated messaging Social Hub, Android Market, Samsung Apps, A-GPS, video messaging. Exchange ActiveSync, offline, voice command, RSS reader, widgets

The Samsung Galaxy S 4G LTE also known as the Droid Charge (Verizon), Galaxy S Aviator (U.S. Cellular) and Galaxy S Lightray 4G (MetroPCS, includes DyleTV), was an Android-based smartphone manufactured by Samsung. It has a 1 GHz "Hummingbird" processor, front and rear cameras, and CDMA and 4G LTE radios. It was announced at CES 2011 under the name Samsung Galaxy S 4G LTE device.

== Specifications ==
=== Hardware ===
The Samsung Galaxy S 4G LTE has the Samsung S5PC110 system-on-chip that is manufactured on a 45 nm process and combines 1 GHz ARM Cortex-A8 based CPU core with a PowerVR SGX540 GPU made by Imagination Technologies; the GPU supports OpenGL ES 1.1/2.0 and is capable of up to 90 million triangles per second. The CPU core, code-named "Hummingbird", was co-developed by Samsung and Intrinsity.

The Samsung Galaxy S 4G LTE uses Swype technology as well as the standard QWERTY input methods.

The Samsung Galaxy S 4G LTE incorporates a rear-facing 8-megapixel camera as well as a front-facing 1.3-megapixel camera.

The Samsung Galaxy S 4G LTE uses a 4.3-inch (110 mm) Super AMOLED Plus touch screen covered by Gorilla Glass, a special crack and scratch resistant material. The screen is a standard RGB stripe display manufactured by Samsung. It has WVGA resolution (480x800 pixels resolution).

=== Software ===
The Samsung Galaxy S 4G LTE runs on Android 2.2.1 Froyo with Samsung's user interface TouchWiz out of the box. In early June 2011, the EE4 update was released to fix some minor bugs within the device. In early December 2011, Android 2.3.6 Gingerbread is started to be pushed out to devices with the "EP4" update. Subsequent updates were codenamed "FP5" and "FP8". Gingerbread was the last Android version to appear on the Galaxy S 4G LTE; Samsung never released newer versions of Android stating that an update (with TouchWiz) would not fit on the Galaxy S 4G LTE's ROM.

== See also ==
- Galaxy Nexus
- List of Android devices
