= Samsung Infuse 4G =

Smartphone model

Samsung Infuse 4G (SGH-i997)
- Manufacturer: Samsung Electronics
- First released: 15 May 2011
- Successor: Samsung Galaxy S II
- Related: Samsung Galaxy S
- Compatible networks: GSM/EDGE 850/900/1800/1900; UMTS 850/1900/2100; UMTS 900/AWS/2100; HSDPA 21.1 Mbit/s; HSUPA 5.76 Mbit/s; GPRS Class 10
- Form factor: Slate
- Dimensions: 132 mm (5.2 in) H 71 mm (2.8 in) W 9 mm (0.35 in) D
- Weight: 129 g (4.6 oz); 94 g (3.3 oz) without battery
- Operating system: Android 2.3.6 "Gingerbread" on AT&T, 2.3.3 on Rogers Wireless
- CPU: Single-core ARM Cortex-A8 Samsung Hummingbird S5PC110, 1.2 GHz
- GPU: PowerVR SGX540
- Memory: 512 MBRAM, actual RAM shown on device is 429 MB
- Storage: 16 GB (Flash NAND memory) + microSD (up to 32 GB supported)
- Battery: 1750 mAh Internal Rechargeable Li-ion; Talk Time: 8 hours Standby : 400 hours
- Rear camera: 8 Megapixel with auto focus, 720p HD video, self shot, action shot, panorama shot, stop motion, smile shot, add me
- Front camera: 1.3 MP
- Display: 4.5-inch 480 × 800 px WVGA super Super AMOLED Plus at 207 ppi
- External display: mini HDMI via micro USB slot
- Data inputs: Multi-touch capacitive touchscreen display, 3-axis accelerometer, 3-axis gyroscope, digital compass, proximity & light sensors, Swype
- SAR: Head: 0.2 W/kg 1 g Body: 1.26 W/kg 1 g Hotspot: 1.260 W/kg 1 g

The Samsung Infuse 4G was an Android smartphone that was released by Samsung in May 2011. It has a 1.2 GHz Hummingbird processor with 8–16 GB internal Flash memory, a 4.5 inch 480×800 pixel Super AMOLED Plus capacitive touchscreen display, an 8-megapixel camera and a 1.3-megapixel front-facing camera.

This is the third phone released in AT&T's HSDPA+ range. In 2011, the Samsung Infuse 4G passed FCC certification. On 5 May, Samsung, at their conference in New York, announced that the phone would be available to market on 15 May. Due to the era of Android smartphones, Samsung collaborated with Rovio to make an exclusive version of Angry Birds only on Samsung Infuse 4G.

== Availability ==
=== In the United States ===
The Samsung Infuse 4G phone was released in the United States on 15 May 2011.

==== AT&T ====
A version of the Samsung Infuse with support for UMTS 850/1900/2100 MHz was first made available on 15 May 2011. These UMTS bands are used by AT&T in the U.S. and Rogers in Canada. This version remained SIM locked stock, it can be unlocked with third party tools.

=== In Canada ===
==== Rogers ====
An updated Samsung Infuse 4G was announced for Canada. Coming shipped with Android 2.3.3 Gingerbread and capable of 720p video recording, the release date was 26 July 2011 and pricing was $0.01 with contract, and $549 without a contract.

== Hardware ==
The Samsung Infuse is powered by the Hummingbird (also known as S5PC110 and Exynos 3110) system-on-chip manufactured on a 45 nm process and comprising a 1.2 GHz ARM Cortex-A8 CPU and a PowerVR SGX540 GPU. It comes with 512 MB RAM and 16 GB internal storage.

The phone has a 4.5 inch Super AMOLED Plus screen with a resolution of 480x800 pixels (WVGA) and a capacitive touchscreen that supports multi-touch gestures. Unlike most of the other Samsung phones with AMOLED display, the display of the Infiuse 4G uses the conventional RGB matrix rather than the PenTile matrix. According to Samsung, use of the RGB matrix improves contrast and outdoor visibility.

The phone has an 8.0-megapixel camera with a single LED flash and autofocus on the rear and a 1.3-megapixel camera on the front with digital zoom. The rear camera is capable of 720p video recording at 30 fps.

The phone allows for full 1080p video playback, with a built in hardware decoder for H.263, H.264 and MPEG-4 video; it can also play MP3, AAC+, AMR, Ogg Vorbis, WAV, MIDI, FLAC and WMA audio. It has a Micro-B USB port at the bottom which conforms to the GSMA Universal Charging Solution. HDMI output is available through the Micro USB port using an adapter. A 3.5mm stereo jack is also included on the top of the phone, adding control functionality as well to the stereo headphones.

The storage included is a built-in 16 GB NAND Flash chip, and the phone has an expandable microSD card slot allowing up to an additional 32 GB card to be installed. The device comes with a 2 GB MicroSD card.

=== Cellular ===
There are two versions of the Samsung Infuse 4G. The first to be released is AT&T's Infuse which is SIM locked. The second is with the Canadian Rogers network. The Infuse can be unlocked in a matter of minutes with third party tools. It supports most H+ GSM and 3G providers in the US, Europe and Asia. The GSM radio frequencies covered are 850 MHz, 900 MHz, 1800 MHz, 1900 MHz, 2100 MHz. It supports UMTS, HSDPA, HSUPA, 2G (Edge), 3G and pseudo 4G (enhanced 3g) via HSDPA Category 14 supporting up to 21.1 megabits per second. This is the third HSDPA+ phone in AT&T's range, after the Motorola Atrix and HTC Inspire 4G, though this is the first one rated at the full 21 Mbit/s bandwidth of its limited available backhauled (fiber) network. The phone supports quad-band frequencies.

== Software ==
As of September 27, 2011, the Infuse was supplied with Android 2.2 Froyo customized with Samsung's TouchWiz 3.0 UI, with an updated Home Screen Launcher application.

Samsung applications included are a special version of Angry Birds, Allshare, MediaHub, Memo, Mini Diary, My Files, Quick Office and Write and Go.

Bloatware on the AT&T supplied phone, which may not be removed in stock form includes, AT&T Navigator, AT&T Code Scanner, AT&T Family Map, My AT&T, Live TV and YPmobile.

Software bundled from Google: Android Market, Gmail, Google Talk, Google Latitude, Facebook, Email and YouTube.

=== Android 2.3.6 Gingerbread update ===
Anyone who purchased a 2011-released Android phone, which included the Samsung Infuse 4G, was eligible to receive an update to Android 2.3.x ("Gingerbread").

On 14 September 2011, AT&T rolled out a 14.5 MB maintenance update that, according to Samsung, improves the auto-brightness setting on the phone, enables warnings to display when in Download Mode and enhances GPS functionality and call quality. Google Books was also added. Firmware 2.2.1, Baseband I997UCKH1, Kernel 2.6.32.9, Build FROYO.UCKH1.

Kies Mini for the Infuse was released on 18 January 2012. It was available to download on the main downloads page for the phone on Samsung's website.

On 1 February 2012, AT&T announced that Android 2.3.6 Gingerbread had been released for the phone and posted a change log of the new features. The update required connecting the phone to a Windows computer with Kies Mini (not Kies) installed; Apple computers and OTA were not supported. On 3 February 2012, the update went live on Kies Mini, but in the following days, many users reported having difficulty downloading the update. Since then, Samsung has released a working version of Kies Mini.

== Legal battle ==
- Samsung and Apple have filed at least 30 lawsuits against each other in ten countries. The San Jose, California, court, refused Apple's lawsuit request to block sales of Samsung's Infuse 4G and Galaxy Tab 10.1.

== See also ==
- Galaxy Nexus
- List of Android smartphones
