= Essential patent =

Patent covering a technical standard

An essential patent or standard-essential patent (SEP) is a patent that claims an invention that must be used to comply with a technical standard. Standard-setting organizations (SSOs) normally require their members to agree to license their essential patents on fair, reasonable and non-discriminatory terms. Determining which patents are essential to a particular standard can be complex.

== See also ==
- Patent ambush, a situation in which patents are withheld during development of a proposed standard
- Patent infringement, the commission of a prohibited act with respect to a patented invention
- Patent thicket, a negatively connoted term for an overlapping set of patent rights
- Orange-Book-Standard, a German decision on the interaction between patent law and technical standards
- Standardization, the process of creating technical standards

== Further reading and viewing ==
- "Potential Antitrust Liability Based on a Patent Owner's Manipulation of Industry Standard Setting", Proceedings of ABA Antitrust Section Spring Meeting (2003) by Janice M. Mueller.
- "Patent Misuse Through the Capture of Industry Standards", 17 Berkeley Tech. L.J. 623 (2002) by Janice M. Mueller.
- Mossoff, Adam; Contreras, Jorge; Kulbaski, James J. (November 30, 2012). Standards-Essential Patents: Where Do IP Protections End and Antitrust Concerns Begin? (video). Washington Legal Foundation. Archived from the original (ASX) on March 3, 2016.
- Vidal, Kathi (10 April 2022). "Standard essential patent policy and practices: We want to hear from you!". www.uspto.gov.
