= Reasonable and non-discriminatory licensing =

Patenting methodology intended to produce a technical standard

Reasonable and non-discriminatory (RAND) terms, also known as fair, reasonable, and non-discriminatory (FRAND) terms, denote a voluntary licensing commitment that standards organizations often request from the owner of an intellectual property right (usually a patent) that is, or may become, essential to practice a technical standard. Put differently, a F/RAND commitment is a voluntary agreement between the standard-setting organization and the holder of standard-essential patents. U.S. courts, as well as courts in other jurisdictions, have found that, in appropriate circumstances, the implementer of a standard—that is, a firm or entity that uses a standard to render a service or manufacture a product—is an intended third-party beneficiary of the FRAND agreement, and, as such, is entitled to certain rights conferred by that agreement.

A standard-setting organization is an industry group that sets common standards for its particular industry to ensure compatibility and interoperability of devices manufactured by different companies. A patent becomes standard-essential when a standard-setting organization sets a standard that adopts the technology that the patent covers.

Because a patent, under most countries' legal regimes, grants its owner an exclusive right to exclude others from making, using, selling, or importing the invention, a standard-setting organization generally must obtain permission from the patent holder to include a patented technology in its standard. So, it will often request that a patent holder clarify its willingness to offer to license its standard-essential patents on FRAND terms. If the patent holder refuses upon request to license a patent that has become essential to a standard, then the standard-setting organization must exclude that technology. When viewed in this light, the FRAND commitment serves to harmonize the private interests of patent holders and the public interests of standard-setting organizations. Many scholars have written about these topics, as well as a variety of other legal and economic issues concerning licensing on F/RAND terms.

== F/RAND as a contract ==
Standard-setting organizations commonly adopt policies that govern the ownership of patent rights that apply to the standards they adopt (the patent policy). In the United States, the patent holder's agreement to adhere by the patent policy creates a legally binding contract, as the Court of Appeals for the Ninth Circuit ruled in Microsoft v. Motorola. One of the most common policies is to require a patent holder that voluntarily agrees to include its patented technology in the standard to license that technology on "reasonable and non-discriminatory terms" (RAND) or on "fair, reasonable, and non-discriminatory terms" (FRAND). The two terms are generally interchangeable; FRAND seems to be preferred in Europe and RAND in the U.S.

Some commentators argue that standard-setting organizations include the FRAND obligation in their bylaws primarily as a means of enhancing the pro-competitive character of their industry. They are intended to prevent members from engaging in licensing abuse based on the monopolistic advantage generated as a result of having their intellectual property rights (IPR) included in the industry standards. Once an organization is offering a FRAND license they are required to offer that license to anyone (wishing to access the standard), not necessarily only members of the organization. Without such commitment, members could use monopoly power inherent in a standard to impose unfair, unreasonable and discriminatory licensing terms that would damage competition and inflate their own relative position.

On the other hand, commentators stress that the FRAND commitment also serves to ensure that the holder of a patent that becomes essential to the standard will receive royalties from users of the standard that adequately compensate the patent holder for the incremental value that its technology contributes to the standard. The development of a patented technology typically requires significant investment in research, and contributing that technology to a standard is not the only option by which a patent holder can recoup that investment and thus monetize its invention. For example, a patent holder has the option to monetize that invention through exclusive use or exclusive licensing. Technology owners might have insufficient incentives to contribute their technologies to a standard-setting organization without the promise of an adequate royalty. The promise of a F/RAND royalty address that problem: the patent holder will typically agree to contribute its technology to the standard, thus forgoing the exclusive use or the exclusive licensing of its technology, in exchange for the assurance that it will receive adequate compensation in reasonable royalties.

In 2013, court decisions and scholarly articles cited FRAND commitments 10 times more often than in 2003.

== Definitions ==
While there are no legal precedents to spell out specifically what the actual terms mean, it can be interpreted from the testimony of people like Professor Mark Lemley from Stanford University, in front of the United States Senate Committee on the Judiciary that the individual terms are defined as follows:

Fair relates mainly to the underlying licensing terms. Drawing from anti-trust/competition law; fair terms means terms which are not anti-competitive and that would not be considered unlawful if imposed by a dominant firm in their relative market. Examples of terms that would breach this commitment are: requiring licensees to buy licenses for products that they do not want in order to get a license for the products they do want or requiring licensees to take licenses to certain unwanted or unneeded patents to obtain licenses to other desired patents (bundling); requiring licensees to license their own IP to the licensor for free (free grant backs); and including restrictive conditions on licensees' dealings with competitors (mandatory exclusivity).

Reasonable refers mainly to the licensing rates. According to some, a reasonable licensing rate is a rate charged on licenses which would not result in an unreasonable aggregate rate if all licensees were charged a similar rate. According to this view, aggregate rates that would significantly increase the cost to the industry and make the industry uncompetitive are unreasonable. Similarly, a reasonable licensing rate must reward the licensor with adequate compensation for contributing its essential patents to a standard. Compensation is adequate if it provides the licensor with the incentive to continue investing and contributing to the standard in future time periods. A licensor which has several different licensing packages might be tempted to have both reasonable and unreasonable packages. However having a reasonable "bundled" rate does not excuse having unreasonable licensing rates for smaller unbundled packages. All licensing rates must be reasonable.

Non-discriminatory relates to both the terms and the rates included in licensing agreements. As the name suggests this commitment requires that licensors treat each individual licensee in a similar manner. This does not mean that the rates and payment terms cannot change dependent on the volume and creditworthiness of the licensee. However it does mean that the underlying licensing condition included in a licensing agreement must be the same regardless of the licensee. This obligation is included in order to maintain a level playing field with respect to existing competitors and to ensure that potential new entrants are free to enter the market on the same basis.

The most controversial issue in RAND licensing is whether the "reasonable" license price should include the value contributed by the standard-setting organization's decision to adopt the standard. A technology is often more valuable after it has been widely adopted than when it is one alternative among many; there is a good argument that a license price that captures that additional value is not "reasonable" because it does not reflect the intrinsic value of the technology being licensed. On the other hand, the adoption of the standard may signal that the adopted technology is valuable, and the patent holder should be rewarded accordingly. That is particularly relevant when the value of the patent is not clearly known before the adoption of the standard.

Some interpretations of "non-discriminatory" can include time-oriented licensing terms such as an "early bird" license offered by a licensor where terms of a RAND license are better for initial licensees or for licensees who sign a license within the first year of its availability.

== Excluding costless distribution schemes ==
RAND terms exclude intangible goods which the producer may decide to distribute at no cost and where third parties may make further copies. Take for example a software package that is distributed at no cost and to which the developer wants to add support for a video format which requires a patent licence. If there is a licence which requires a tiny per-copy fee, the software project will not be able to avail of the licence. The licence may be called "(F)RAND", but the modalities discriminate against a whole category of intangible goods such as free software and freeware.

This form of discrimination can be similarly caused by common licence terms such as only applying to complete implementations of the licensed standard, limiting use to particular fields, or restricting redistribution. The Free Software Foundation suggests the term "uniform fee only" (UFO) to reflect that such "(F)RAND" licenses are inherently discriminatory.

== Related licenses ==
Related to RAND licenses are RAND-Z (RAND with zero royalty) or RAND-RF (RAND Royalty Free) licensing, in which a company promises to license the technology at no charge, but implementers still have to get the licenser's permission to implement. The licenser may not make money off the deal but can still stop some type of products or require some type of reciprocity or do more subtle things like drag out the licensing process.

== Negotiating process ==
The negotiating process for FRAND licenses places requirements on the patent owner and the envisioned patentee. The terms for these negotiations were set in German case law in a case regarding the Orange-Book-Standard, and these terms are often used in licensing negotiations. In 2015, the European Court of Justice interpreted FRAND licensing terms in case Huawei v ZTE (C170/13, ECLI:EU:C:2015:477 significantly diverging from the Orange-Book-Standard.

== See also ==
- EU law
