= Krinsky v. Doe 6 =

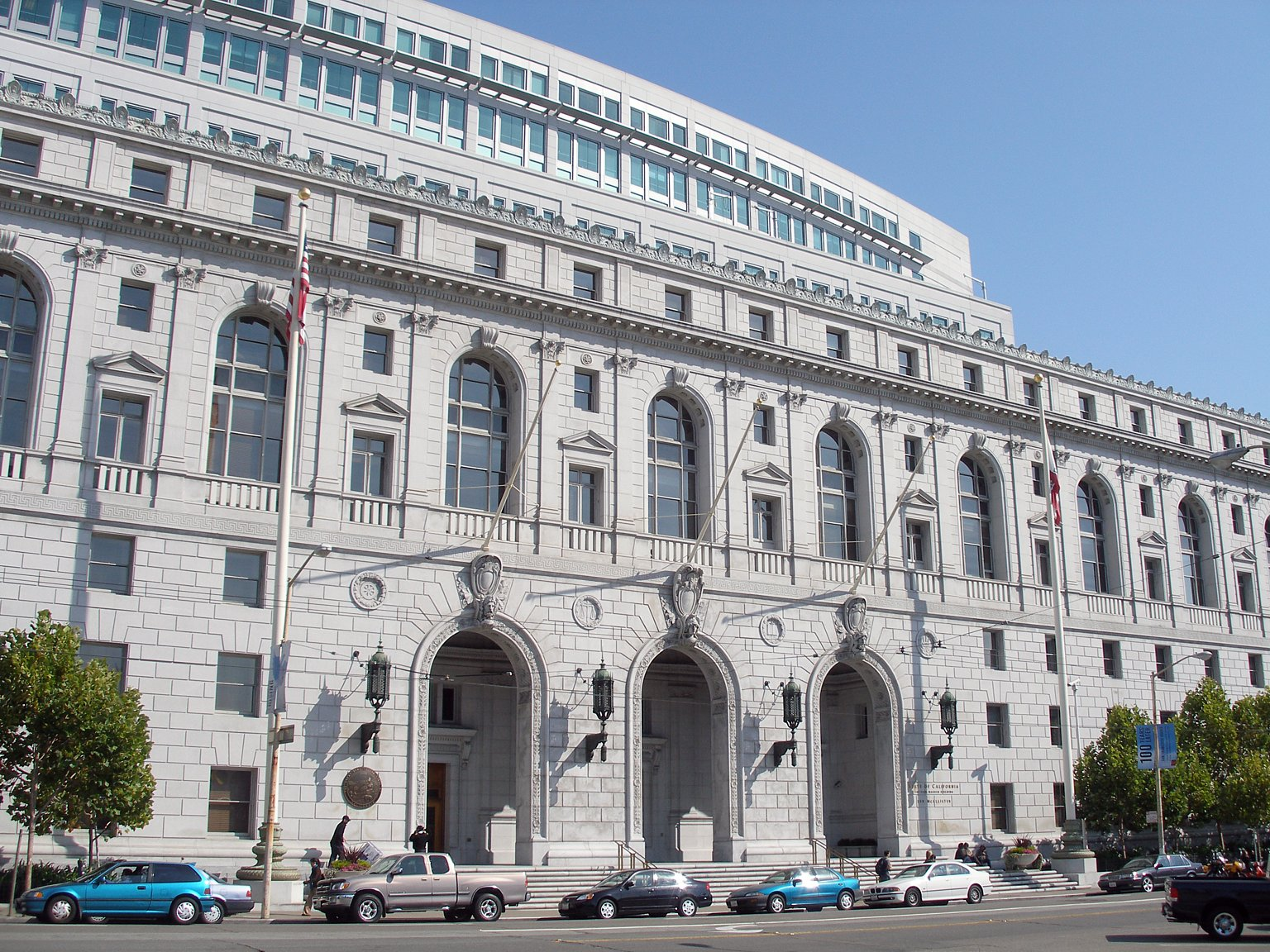
- Court: California Courts of Appeal
- Decided: Feb 6, 2008
- Citation: 159 Cal.App.4th 1154

Case history
- Prior action: Santa Clara Superior Court denied Doe 6's motion to quash the subpoena for his identity.

Court membership
- Judges sitting: Franklin D. Elia, Conrad L. Rushing and Eugene M. Premo

Case opinions
- Applying the prima facie standard, the Court held that Doe 6's anonymous speech was protected under the First Amendment and upheld Doe 6's motion to quash the disclosure of his identity.

Keywords
- Defamation, Anonymous speech, Internet speech

Krinsky v. Doe 6, was a decision by the California Court of Appeal, Sixth District, addressing the evidentiary standard required of plaintiffs seeking the identification of anonymous Internet posters. The case addressed defamation and the right to anonymous speech on the Internet. Plaintiff Lisa Krinsky sued Doe 6, an anonymous poster to Yahoo! message boards, for defamation. Krinsky served a subpoena to Yahoo! for Doe 6's identity. Doe 6 filed a motion to quash the subpoena, "contending that he had a First Amendment right to speak anonymously on the Internet."

While the court declined to adopt more stringent unmasking standards used by other courts, the Appellate Court nonetheless held that the language of Doe 6's posts were not actionable defamatory statements because they did not assert objective facts about the plaintiff. Rather, it held that Doe 6's posts "fall into the category of crude, satirical hyperbole which, while reflecting the immaturity of the speaker, constitute protected opinion under the First Amendment."

== Facts of the case ==
Plaintiff Lisa Krinsky sued 10 anonymous "Doe" defendants after reading posts they made on online message boards hosted by Yahoo!, Inc. Krinsky was the president, chairman of the board, and chief operating officer of SFBC International., Inc, a publicly traded company. The 10 Does had made allegedly defamatory remarks about Krinsky and other SFBC executives on the Yahoo! Finance message boards. Under the pseudonym "Senor_Pinche_Wey", Doe 6 made the following remarks on the Yahoo! message boards:

- Called Jerry Seifer, a SFBC executive, a "mega scum bag" and a "cockroach", and suggested that other executives were also "cockroaches."
- Referred to Krinsky and two other SFBC executives as "boobs, losers, and crooks."
- Posted a mocking list of "Jerry 'Lew' Seifer's New Year's resolutions," including a statement referring directly to Krinsky, "I will reciprocate felatoin [sic] with Lisa even though she has fat thighs, a fake medical degree, 'queefs', and has poor feminine hygiene."

Krinsky sued Doe 6 for defamation and "intentional interference with a contractual and/or business employment relationship." She served a subpoena to Yahoo! to identify the 10 anonymous posters. Defendant "Doe 6" filed a motion to quash the subpoena.

=== Initial ruling ===
The trial court recognized that First Amendment protection applied to anonymous Internet speech. However, the court did not decide whether Doe 6's statements on the message boards were protected speech. The trial court denied the motion based on "the totality of the circumstances." Doe 6 appealed, claiming a First Amendment right to anonymous speech.

== California Court of Appeal Opinion ==
The California Court of Appeal reversed the trial court's order denying Doe 6's motion to quash the subpoena and upheld Doe 6's right to remain anonymous. The Court recognized that while the First Amendment right applied to Internet speakers, this right must be weighed against plaintiffs' interest in identifying the speakers in order to pursue their claims. In determining circumstances under which an anonymous online speaker may be unmasked, the Court reviewed several standards applied in previous cases.

The Court rejected the "good faith" standard applied in In re Subpoena Duces Tecum to America Online on the basis that it offered "no practical, reliable way to determine the plaintiff's good faith and leaves the speaker with little protection." The Court also rejected the four-part test applied in Dendrite International, Inc. v. Doe No. 3. The Court reasoned that the four-part test "required too much" of plaintiffs and it was aim to ensure plaintiffs did not use discovery to "harass, intimidate or silence critics in the public forum opportunities presented by the Internet." The Court reviewed the summary judgement standard applied in Doe v. Cahill but did not agree that plaintiffs were required to publish notice on the same message board where the allegedly defamatory statement was posted.

Finally, the Court adopted the standard requiring a plaintiff to make a prima facie showing that she has a valid claim against the anonymous defendant before she can discover the defendant's identity. Under this standard, plaintiff Krinsky would need to produce evidence that was accessible to her in order to support each element of her defamation and interference with contract claims.

=== Defamation ===
The key issue was whether Doe 6's posts constitute facts or opinions. A statement was defamatory only if it asserted objective facts about the plaintiff, instead of opinions that were constitutionally protected.

The Court reasoned that Doe 6's posts cannot be interpreted as asserting objective facts because nothing in the posts suggested that the author was imparting knowledge of facts to the reader. Also, no reasonable reader would have taken the posts seriously and "comprehend harsh language and belligerent tone as anything more than an irrational, vituperative expression of contempt for the three officers of SFBC."

Therefore, the Court held that the language of Doe 6's posts were not actionable defamatory statements. Rather, "they fall into the category of crude, satirical hyperbole which, while reflecting the immaturity of the speaker, constitute protected opinion under the First Amendment."

=== Interference with Contractual/Business Relationships ===
With regard to the accusation of interference with a contractual/business relationship, the court agreed with Doe 6's argument that "the applicability of the First Amendment to his speech on the message board forecloses on [Krinsky's] claim", that is, that the accusation of interference with a business relationship was irrelevant given that Doe 6's speech was protected by the US Constitution.

== See also ==
- Anonymity on the Internet
- Anonymous post
- Doe v. Cahill
- Anonymous Online Speakers v. United States District Court for the District of Nevada
- Dendrite International, Inc. v. Doe No. 3
- Reunion Industries, Inc. v. Doe 1
- Best Western, International, Inc. v. Doe
- Brendan L. Smith (January 1, 2010), "Meet John Doe" ABA Journal (American Bar Association)
