= Paul Alan Levy =

American attorney

- Education: Reed College; University of Chicago (J.D.)
- Occupation: Attorney
- Employer: Public Citizen
- Known for: litigating Internet-related free speech cases

Paul Alan Levy is an American attorney specializing in Internet-related free speech issues. From December 1977 until June 2026, he was a staff attorney at Public Citizen. He has litigated cases in state and federal courts throughout the United States about the identification of anonymous Internet speakers, and argued four cases in front of the US Supreme Court. His amicus curiae brief in Dendrite International, Inc. v. Doe No. 3 proposed a four-prong test that was adopted by the New Jersey Superior Court, Appellate Division and has become the model for other cases in which plaintiffs demand the unmasking of an anonymous Internet speaker.

== Background ==
His Internet practice also includes the defense of trademark and copyright claims brought as a means of suppressing critical web sites. His cases in this area, such as Bosley Medical, Inc. v. Kremer, Lamparello v. Falwell, and Jenzabar v. Long Bow Group, have established the right to create Internet "gripe sites" that include the trademark names of companies in their domain names and meta tags.

According to Eugene Volokh of the Washington Post, Levy, who is one of Public Citizen's leading public interest lawyers, is a reliable source when it comes to figuring out what is going on in matters such as the case of Brett Kimberlin. According to Reason magazine, Levy has been very helpful when it comes to the conduct within media and how commenting user names are presented.

Levy had legal action taken against him by Arthur Alan Wolk in relation to a blog post he made.

== Education and career ==
Levy earned his bachelor’s degree from Reed College in 1973, Phi Beta Kappa, and a J.D. from the University of Chicago in 1976, cum laude, Order of the Coif. After working as a law clerk to Wade H. McCree at the United States Court of Appeals for the Sixth Circuit and Special Assistant to McCree as Solicitor General, Levy joined Public Citizen Litigation Group in 1977 to represent workers in rank-and-file labor law cases, largely representing dissident union members in cases involving union governance. Until his 2026 retirement, he remained with the Litigation Group, with the exception of a sabbatical in 1983–1984, when he taught at the Benjamin N. Cardozo School of Law. From 1984 to 1999 he was outside general counsel for Teamsters for a Democratic Union.

He is also, since 1983, a member of the board of directors of the Association for Union Democracy, and for several years chair of the American Bar Association Section of Intellectual Property Law, Special Committee on Online Issues, Domain Name Subcommittee. From 1980 to 2006 he was a member of the steering committee, Labor and Employment Committee, National Lawyers Guild.

Levy gives a continuing education course on Practical Considerations in Litigating Online Free Speech Cases, and serves on the Legal Review Committee for the American Civil Liberties Union for the District of Columbia, and until 2026 served on the Board of Directors of the Bel Cantanti Opera/

== Publications and cases ==
Levy has argued scores of cases in United States Courts of Appeal, and in the United States Supreme Court, as well as writing briefs for parties in seven other cases.

In Smith v. Wal-Mart Stores, he defended the right of a parodist to make fun of Wal-Mart's trademarks. In arguing against the issuance of prior restraint in Bank Julius Baer v. Wikileaks, he had the insight that the case had been filed without subject-matter jurisdiction. His work in such cases as Lee v. Makhnevich and Prestigious Pets v. Duchouquette, opposing the enforcement of non-disparagement clauses in consumer contracts, presaged the adoption of the federal Consumer Review Fairness Act that made such clauses illegal. In Dimondstein v. Postal Workers, he established that the right of intra-union candidates to have campaign literature distributed to union’s list of membership addresses included the right to send literature by email. In Smith v. Garcia, he established the right of Internet speakers to oppose orders compelling the "delisting" of their blogs from search engines. He has litigated cases under anti-SLAPP laws in several different states and advocated the adoption of new laws of this type as well as toughening existing ones.

Levy’s most significant freedom of speech case is Dendrite International, Inc. v. Doe No. 3, in which he formulated a four-pronged test for determining whether an anonymous speaker should be unmasked. Courts adopting Levy's test in Dendrite include the Maryland Court of Appeals, the US District Court for the Western District of Washington, the New York Supreme Court, Appellate Division, the Arizona Court of Appeals in Mobilisa, Inc. v. Doe, the California Court of Appeal for the Sixth Circuit, and many others. In Doe v. Cahill, the Supreme Court of Delaware adopted two of Dendrite's four prongs.

Levy's work on cases involving anonymity is discussed in Jeff Kosseff's 2022 book The United States of Anonymous. A summary of the cases addressing this issue appears on Public Citizen's website.

A number of cases in the last several years of his career were devoted to the problems caused by copyright trolls.
