= Bates v. City of Little Rock =

- Supreme Court of the United States

Argued November 18, 1959 Decided February 23, 1960
- Full case name: Bates et al. v. City of Little Rock et al.
- Citations: 361 U.S. 516 (more) 80 S. Ct. 412; 4 L. Ed. 2d 480; 1960 U.S. LEXIS 1601

Case history
- Prior: Certiorari to the Supreme Court of Arkansas
- Subsequent: 229 Ark. 819, 319 S. W. 2d 37, reversed.

Holding
- State governments cannot compel the disclosure of an organization's membership lists when it inhibits freedom of association.

Court membership
- Chief Justice Earl Warren Associate Justices Hugo Black · Felix Frankfurter; William O. Douglas · Tom C. Clark; John M. Harlan II · William J. Brennan Jr. Charles E. Whittaker · Potter Stewart

Case opinions
- Majority: Stewart, joined by unanimous
- Concurrence: Black & Douglas

Laws applied
- U.S. Const. amend. I and XIV

Bates v. City of Little Rock, 361 U.S. 516 (1960), was a case in which the Supreme Court of the United States held that the First Amendment to the U.S. Constitution forbade state governments from compelling the disclosure of an organization's membership lists via a tax-exemption regulatory scheme.

This was a companion case to NAACP v. Alabama (1958), which also held that NAACP membership records are protected by First Amendment freedom of association, and Talley v. California (1960), which held that Talley, a civil rights activist, could not be fined for an anonymous flyer. These cases help establish the right to privacy under the First Amendment, expanded on in Roe v. Wade (1973) and Brown v. Socialist Workers '74 Campaign Committee (1982).

The court, citing De Jonge v. Oregon and NAACP v. Alabama, compared freedom of association to other First Amendment rights that were incorporated: "[It] is now beyond dispute that freedom of association for the purpose of advancing ideas and airing grievances is protected by the Due Process Clause of the Fourteenth Amendment from invasion by the States."

== See also ==
- List of United States Supreme Court cases, volume 361
