= Doe v. 2themart.com Inc. =

Doe v. 2TheMart: Anonymity upheld online

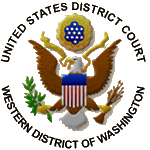
- Court: United States District Court for the Western District of Washington
- Decided: April 26, 2001
- Citation: 140 F. Supp. 2d 1088

Holding
- The court held that 2TheMart.com (TMRT) failed to show that the identities of these anonymous Internet users were directly and materially relevant to the core defense in the litigation, and thus the subpoena should not be issued. Therefore, Doe's motion to quash the subpoena was granted.

Court membership
- Judge sitting: Thomas S. Zilly

Keywords
- Anonymous post, Doe subpoena

Doe v. 2themart.com Inc., 140 F. Supp. 2d 1088 (2001), was a federal case decided by United States District Court for the Western District of Washington, on the issue of an individual's First Amendment right to speak anonymously on the Internet and a private party's right to disclose the identity of the anonymous Internet user by enforcing a civil subpoena. The court held that 2TheMart.com (TMRT) failed to show that the identities of these anonymous Internet users were directly and materially relevant to the core defense in the litigation, and thus the subpoena should not be issued. Therefore, Doe's motion to quash the subpoena was granted.

== History ==
In a previous case, the shareholders of 2TheMart.com (TMRT) brought a class action against the company, alleging fraud on the market. To establish a defense that the defendant did not cause any injury to the plaintiff, TMRT issued a subpoena to the tech stock discussion website Silicon Investor and its then owner InfoSpace, Inc. (InfoSpace) on which TMRT has an Internet bulletin board, seeking to obtain the identities of twenty-three users who have posted on the TMRT bulletin board unfavorable messages about the company. InfoSpace Informed these users of receipt of the subpoena. One of the users moved to quash the subpoena under a pseudonym John Doe (Doe), alleging that enforcement of the subpoena would violate his or her First Amendment right to speak anonymously. This motion to quash is the subject of the present case.

This motion to quash raised an important issue on the First Amendment right of an Internet user, that is, whether and on what basis can a private party seek to discover the identity of anonymous Internet users who might be third-party witnesses in the litigation through the enforcement of a civil subpoena?

== District Court ruling ==
Doe's motion to quash the subpoena was granted. In other words, the court supported Doe's contention that TMRT had no right to discover the identity of the anonymous users on the InfoSpace website.

Although the court did not find suitable federal court authority on the issue of a third-party seeking through a civil subpoena to reveal the identities of anonymous Internet users, the court maintained that the anonymity of Internet speech is protected by the First Amendment. Therefore, when requesting to identify anonymous users, the litigants are required to show that the need for the users' identification information outweighs the users' First Amendment rights.

In the case that the anonymous Internet user whose identity is being subpoenaed is also the defendant of the underlying litigation, the plaintiff is required to show that they are bringing the lawsuit in good faith, as well as the compelling need for the discovery of the identifying information. See also the previous cases Columbia Ins. Co. v. Seescandy.com 185 F.R.D. 573 and In re Subpoena Duces Tecum to America Online, Inc. 2000 WL 1210372(Va. Cir. Ct. 2000)

Since in this case the anonymous user is not the defendant, but is instead a non-party witness in the underlying litigation, the court chose to set a higher standard for disclosing the identity of the anonymous non-party. In particular, the court considered the following four factors to decide whether the subpoena should be issued:

1. Was the subpoena brought in good faith? There is no clear evidence to show that TMRT brought the subpoena in bad faith or for an improper purpose. The reason that TMRT brought the subpoena was to defend against a shareholder class action lawsuit. However, the information that the original subpoena sought for discovery was extremely broad, which required to disclose not only personal emails but also other personal information that has no relation with the lawsuit. Therefore, this disregard for privacy protection and First Amendment right of the Internet users weighs against TMRT.
2. Is the claim or defense for which the information is sought deemed core to the case? No. The information sought by TMRT is associated with only one of 27 defenses. Also, this single defense goes far from the core of the matter. Therefore, the second factor weighs against TMRT as well.
3. Is the identity information of the anonymous user directly and materially relevant to that claim or defense? No. TMRT failed to show that the identity of the anonymous InfoSpace users is directly and materially related to any core defense. Their identity is not necessary to further the litigation to proceed.
4. Is there any other source from which the required information is available? Yes. TMRT may obtain the required information by reading the archived chat room documents and comparing the timing of the relevant statements with the timing of fluctuations in the TMRT stock price. In other words, TMRT can obtain the information in another way without invading the Internet users' First Amendment rights.

After analyzing and weighing these four factors, the court held that TMRT failed to show that the identities of these anonymous Internet users were directly and materially relevant to the core defense in the litigation, and thus the subpoena should not be issued. Therefore, Doe's motion to quash the subpoena was granted.

== Tests ==
A different line of cases addresses the issue whether a civil subpoena can be issued to discover the identities of Internet anonymous users so that the internet users can be sued for their speech. Several states courts have set forth different tests, each attempting to balance the First Amendment right of the users to speak anonymously and the plaintiff's right to remedy wrongful behavior on the Internet.

1. Cahill test, called the Summary Judgment standard. The plaintiff must state the exact defamatory statements, and the trial court must balance the defendant's First Amendment rights against the strength of the plaintiff's case.
2. Dendrite test. A multi-part test:(1) the plaintiff must make good faith efforts to notify the poster and give the poster a reasonable opportunity to respond; (2) the plaintiff must specifically identify the poster's allegedly actionable statements; (3) the complaint must set forth a prima facie cause of action; (4) the plaintiff must support each element of the claim with sufficient evidence; and (5) "the court must balance the defendant's First Amendment right of anonymous free speech against the strength of the prima facie case presented and the necessity for the disclosure of the anonymous defendant's identity."
3. Mobilisa test. When deciding this case, the court set forth a new three-part test by considering both of the Dendrite and Cahill tests: (1) the requesting party shows the anonymous speaker has been given adequate notice and a reasonable opportunity to respond to the discovery request; (2) the requesting party must demonstrate that it would survive a motion for summary judgment on the elements, not dependent on knowing the speaker's identity, and (3) the court need balance the strength of the requesting party's case against the need for disclosure of the anonymous poster's identity.
