= Doe v. Reed =

- Supreme Court of the United States

Argued April 28, 2010 Decided June 24, 2010
- Full case name: Doe et al v. Reed, Washington Secretary of State, et al.
- Docket no.: 09-559
- Citations: 561 U.S. 186 (more) 130 S. Ct. 2811; 177 L. Ed. 2d 493; 2010 U.S. LEXIS 5256

Case history
- Prior: 661 F. Supp. 2d 1194 (W.D. Wash. 2009); 586 F.3d 671 (9th Cir. 2009); cert. granted, 558 U.S. 1142 (2010).

Holding
- Disclosure of referendum petitions does not as a general matter violate the Petition Clause of the First Amendment.

Court membership
- Chief Justice John Roberts Associate Justices John P. Stevens · Antonin Scalia; Anthony Kennedy · Clarence Thomas; Ruth Bader Ginsburg · Stephen Breyer; Samuel Alito · Sonia Sotomayor

Case opinions
- Majority: Roberts, joined by Kennedy, Ginsburg, Breyer, Alito, Sotomayor
- Concurrence: Breyer
- Concurrence: Alito
- Concurrence: Sotomayor, joined by Stevens, Ginsburg
- Concurrence: Stevens (in part), joined by Breyer
- Concurrence: Scalia (in judgment)
- Dissent: Thomas

Laws applied
- U.S. Const. amend. I

Doe v. Reed, 561 U.S. 186 (2010), is a United States Supreme Court case which holds that the disclosure of signatures on a referendum does not violate the Petition Clause of the First Amendment to the United States Constitution.

== Background ==
The Washington State Constitution contains provisions for a referendum system whereby citizens resident in the state may challenge state law. For a challenge to be added to the ballot, a petition must be submitted to the Secretary of State of Washington containing the signatures of registered voters equivalent to 4% of those who voted in the last gubernatorial election. For a signature to be considered valid, the signor must not only be a registered voter but also provide his address as well as the county in which he was registered to vote.

Following a proposed bill to extend the rights afforded to those in domestic partnerships (so that they would be looked upon by the law as if they were married) in Washington, Protect Marriage Washington, an anti-gay marriage group, led a campaign to have the proposal brought forth as a referendum. This effort succeeded, however the referendum narrowly came out in favour of the bill to expand the rights afforded to those in a domestic partnership. Subsequent to this, a number of individuals requested the signature lists used to bring the question to referendum, as these were historically considered matters of public record relating to the passage of legislation. Protect Marriage Washington filed to block the release of these signatures due to the highly charged nature of the topic. The United States District Court for the Western District of Washington granted a preliminary injunction blocking the release of the signature lists, which was reversed by the United States Court of Appeals for the Ninth Circuit.

The issue was moved to the Supreme Court when Justice Anthony Kennedy issued a temporary injunction barring the release of the signatures on October 19, 2009. The arguments were heard on April 28, 2010, with the June 24, 2010 decision seeing the constitutionality of the Washington Public Records Act (PRA) under which the request for signatures had been made in an 8–1 decision, with Justice Clarence Thomas dissenting.

== Opinion ==
The Court found, with only Justice Clarence Thomas dissenting, that the law in Washington State allowing for public disclosure of petition signatures for ballot initiatives was "subject to review under the First Amendment," but that it was subject to a standard of review lower than strict scrutiny, which the Court defined as "exacting scrutiny." Exacting scrutiny "requires a 'substantial relation' between the disclosure requirement and a 'sufficiently important' government interest."

The PRA survived exacting scrutiny because the Court felt the state had a sufficiently important government interest in "preserving electoral integrity." The Court noted that the state was not only protecting against fraud, but also "simple mistake, such as duplicate signatures or signatures of individuals who are not registered to vote in the State." Even though the Washington Secretary of State is charged with reviewing the signatures, he only reviews 3 to 5% of them. "Public disclosure can help cure the inadequacies of the verification and canvassing process." Ultimately, the Court concluded that "public disclosure of referendum petitions in general is substantially related to the important interest of preserving the integrity of the electoral process."

The Court did clarify that the broad ruling in this case does not preclude a narrower holding in a future case in which a plaintiff can show "'a reasonable probability that the compelled disclosure [of personal information] will subject them to threats, harassment, or reprisals from either Government officials or private parties.'” Buckley, supra, at 74, 96 S.Ct. 612; see also Citizens United, 558 U.S., at ––––, 130 S.Ct., at 915. However, in most cases referendums have to do with subjects such as "'tax policy, revenue, budget, or other state law issues'. . . Voters care about such issues, some quite deeply—but there is no reason to assume that any burdens imposed by disclosure of typical referendum petitions would be remotely like the burdens plaintiffs fear in this case." In this case, plaintiffs failed to provide any specific evidence to show that people who voted on this referendum would face such obstacles.

The Court "conclude[d] that disclosure under the PRA would not violate the First Amendment with respect to referendum petitions in general and therefore affirm[ed] the judgment of the Court of Appeals."

Justice Clarence Thomas, in the lone dissenting opinion, argued that the PRA severely burdens the First Amendment right to free speech and "chills participation in the referendum process."

== See also ==
- List of United States Supreme Court cases, volume 561
- James Bopp

=== Related Cases ===
- NAACP v. Alabama
- Brown v. Socialist Workers ’74 Campaign Committee
- McIntyre v. Ohio Elections Commission
