= Miller Music Corp. v. Charles N. Daniels, Inc. =

- Supreme Court of the United States

Argued February 24–25, 1960 Decided April 18, 1960
- Full case name: Miller Music Corp. v. Charles N. Daniels, Inc.
- Citations: 362 U.S. 373 (more) 80 S. Ct. 792; 4 L. Ed. 2d 804; 125 U.S.P.Q. 147

Case history
- Prior: 158 F. Supp. 188 (S.D.N.Y. 1957); affirmed, 265 F.2d 925 (2d Cir. 1959); cert. granted, 361 U.S. 809 (1959).

Holding
- The executor of a copyright holder's will is eligible to renew that copyright.

Court membership
- Chief Justice Earl Warren Associate Justices Hugo Black · Felix Frankfurter; William O. Douglas · Tom C. Clark; John M. Harlan II · William J. Brennan Jr. Charles E. Whittaker · Potter Stewart

Case opinions
- Majority: Douglas, joined by Warren, Black, Clark, Brennan
- Dissent: Harlan, joined by Frankfurter, Whittaker, Stewart

Miller Music Corp. v. Charles N. Daniels, Inc., 362 U.S. 373 (1960), was a United States Supreme Court case in which the Court held the executor of a copyright holder's will is eligible to renew that copyright.
