= Emagic =

Former German music software and hardware company

- Type: Private (GmbH)
- Industry: Music software, Music technology
- Founded: September 1, 1992; 34 years ago in Rellingen, Germany
- Founders: Gerhard Lengeling, Chris Adam
- Defunct: June 12, 2006; 20 years ago
- Fate: Acquired by Apple Computer, Inc.
- Headquarters: Rellingen, Germany
- Key people: Gerhard Lengeling; Chris Adam; Sven Junge
- Products: Logic
- Number of employees: 80+ (2004)
- Website: emagic.de at the Wayback Machine (archived 2004-04-01)

Emagic GmbH was a music software and hardware company founded in Rellingen, Germany in 1992 by Gerhard Lengeling and Chris Adam, joined later by Sven Junge. The company was best known for its digital audio workstation software, Logic. The company was acquired by Apple Computer, Inc. on July 1, 2002, and its Windows-based product offerings were discontinued on September 30. Apple eventually phased out Emagic branding, releasing Logic Pro 7 under the Apple brand on September 29, 2004. Apple continues to develop and offer Logic Pro as their flagship DAW for Mac.

== History ==
=== C-Lab beginnings ===
Gerhard Lengeling, a University of Hamburg medical student, began developing MIDI software with Chris Adam. They approached a Hamburg music store to establish a licensing agreement, and the store owners established C-Lab to enable Lengeling and Adam to distribute their products. Sven Junge joined as Sales Manager. In 1985 they released the SoftTrack 16+ and SuperTrack MIDI sequencing software for the Commodore 64. The following year, ScoreTrack, also for the C64, added notation functionality.

=== Creator and Notator ===
In 1987, C-Lab released Creator, a sequencer for the Atari ST, followed by Notator the following year.

In late 1992 following a dispute with the owners, Lengeling, Adam, and Junge parted ways with C-Lab and founded a new company, Emagic Soft- und Hardware GmbH. The Emagic brand name was created by combining the words 'Electronic' and 'Magic'. In early 1993, they released Notator Logic for the Apple Macintosh, later followed by versions for Atari ST and Windows.

=== Logic ===
The "Notator" was dropped from the name and the product was redesigned from the ground up, and the product became known under the name "Emagic Logic". Original copies of Emagic's Logic software retailed for US$699 (equivalent to $1,604 in 2025), and with plugins ranging from $99 to $299.

The other major software product that Emagic offered was SoundDiver, an editor/librarian for hardware synthesizers. It communicated via MIDI and offered easy patch and sound management. While there was a beta version for Mac OS X, production of SoundDiver was discontinued in 2005.

Emagic formerly offered a line of audio interface hardware, the Audiowerk PCI cards, as well as USB units. A potential post-acquisition successor to these products, the unreleased Asteroid FireWire interface, was the subject of the Apple v. Does trade secret litigation.

=== Acquisition by Apple ===
Emagic was acquired by Apple in July 2002. The announcement included the news that development of the Windows version would no longer continue, rendering Logic 5.5.1 as the final version available for Windows. This announcement caused controversy in the recording industry with an estimated 70,000 users having invested in the Windows route not wishing to reinvest in a complete new system. Despite much speculation in various Pro Audio forums however, exactly how many users may have abandoned Logic upon its acquisition by Apple, or abandoned the Windows platform for the Mac version, remains unknown, but Apple Pro Apps revenue has steadily increased since Apple's acquisition of Emagic, (roughly $2 billion a year as of Q1 2014).

Logic 6 was released in February 2003, serving as the first major release of Logic following Apple's acquisition of Emagic. The following year, it released Logic Pro 6, which replaced Logic Platinum and consolidated over 20 different Emagic products, including all instrument and effect plug-ins, Waveburner Pro (CD Authoring application), and Pro Tools TDM support, into a single product package. Apple also released a scaled down version of Logic called Logic Express, replacing Logic Silver and Logic Gold.

Logic Pro 7 was released on September 29, 2004, the first version of Logic to be released under the Apple brand, with technical support being provided through Apple instead of Emagic. As Emagic's products had been transferred to its parent company, it discontinued all of its older products, but continued to provide technical support until late 2005. Emagic became defunct on June 12, 2006.

Lengeling remains Apple's Senior Director of Software Engineering of Musical Applications, where his team continues to develop and offer Logic Pro as their flagship DAW for Mac.

== Products ==
=== C-Lab software ===
- SuperTrack (for Commodore 64) – MIDI sequencer
- ScoreTrack – scorewriting
- Creator (for Atari ST) – MIDI sequencer
- Notator (for Atari ST) – MIDI sequencer and scorewriter
- Notator Alpha (for Atari ST) – cut-down educational version of Notator
- Aura (for Atari ST) – ear training
- Explorer 1000 – patch editor
- Explorer 32 – patch editor
- Explorer M1 – patch editor
- Midia – MIDI monitor/educational tool
- Polyframe – patch editor
- SoftLink
- Xalyser (for Atari ST) FM synthesizer

=== C-Lab hardware ===
- Unitor (for Atari) – SMPTE/EBU synchroniser
- Unitor 2 (for Atari) – SMPTE synchroniser/MIDI interface
- Combiner (for Atari) – cartridge expansion interface
- Export (for Atari) – MIDI interface
- Falcon mk I, mk II and mk X
- Steady Eye – SMPTE/VITC synchroniser
- Human Touch – Audio synchroniser

=== Emagic software ===
- Logic
- MicroLogic
- Sound Diver
- Waveburner
- Epic TDM
- Guitar Tuner
- Space Designer
- HearMaster – music theory training
- ZAP – audio file compression

==== Software instruments ====
- ES1 synthesizer
- ES2 synthesizer
- EVP73 Fender Rhodes VST instrument
- EVP88 electric piano
- EXS24 sampler
- EXSP24 sample player
- EVB3 Hammond B3 instrument
- EVD6 Hohner Clavinet instrument
- EVOC20 vocoder

=== Emagic hardware ===
- LOG3 (for Atari ST) – MIDI interface
- LOG2mac – MIDI interface
- LOG2PC (c.1991) – ISA 1×1 MIDI interface card (rebranded Midiman MM-401 card)
- Audiowerk II – PCI soundcard
- Audiowerk8 – PCI soundcard
- Unitor 8 – 1U rackmount 8×8 MIDI interface
- AMT8 – 1U rackmount 8×8 MIDI interface
- MT4 – 2×4 MIDI interface
- EMI 6|2m – USB audio interface
- EMI 2|6 – USB audio interface
- Logic Control
