= McIntyre v. Ohio Elections Commission =

- Supreme Court of the United States

Argued October 12, 1994 Decided April 19, 1995
- Full case name: Joseph McIntyre, executor of Estate of Margaret McIntyre, deceased, petitioner v. Ohio Elections Commission, et al.
- Docket no.: 93-986
- Citations: 514 U.S. 334 (more) 115 S. Ct. 1511; 131 L. Ed. 2d 426; 1995 U.S. LEXIS 2847
- Argument: Oral argument
- Opinion announcement: Opinion announcement

Case history
- Prior: 67 Ohio St. 3d 391, 618 N.E.2d 152 (1993); cert. granted, 510 U.S. 1108 (1994).
- Subsequent: On remand, 72 Ohio St. 3d 1544, 650 N.E.2d 903 (1995).

Holding
- Ohio's prohibition of the distribution of anonymous campaign literature abridges the freedom of speech in violation of the First Amendment.

Court membership
- Chief Justice William Rehnquist Associate Justices John P. Stevens · Sandra Day O'Connor; Antonin Scalia · Anthony Kennedy; David Souter · Clarence Thomas; Ruth Bader Ginsburg · Stephen Breyer

Case opinions
- Majority: Stevens, joined by O'Connor, Kennedy, Souter, Ginsburg, Breyer
- Concurrence: Ginsburg
- Concurrence: Thomas (in judgment)
- Dissent: Scalia, joined by Rehnquist

Laws applied
- U.S. Const. amend. I

McIntyre v. Ohio Elections Commission, 514 U.S. 334 (1995), is a case in which the Supreme Court of the United States held that an Ohio statute prohibiting anonymous campaign literature is unconstitutional because it violates the First Amendment to the U.S. Constitution, which protects the freedom of speech. In a 7–2 decision authored by Justice John Paul Stevens, the Court found that the First Amendment protects the decision of an author to remain anonymous.

On April 27, 1988, Margaret McIntyre stood outside of a middle school in Westerville, Ohio, and passed out anonymous leaflets that opposed a proposed school district tax levy. The Ohio Elections Commission fined McIntyre $100 for violating a state law that prohibited the distribution of any kind of political or campaign literature that does not have the name and address of the person responsible for its contents. With the help of the American Civil Liberties Union, McIntyre appealed the fine in court. The county court reversed the fine, holding that because McIntyre did not attempt to mislead the public, the Ohio statute was unconstitutional as it applied to her actions. However, the state court of appeals reinstated the fine, referring to a 1922 decision by the Ohio Supreme Court as precedent, and the Ohio Supreme Court affirmed.

The U.S. Supreme Court reversed the Ohio Supreme Court on April 19, 1995. As precedent, the Court referred to its decision in Talley v. California (1960), in which the Court found a similar law prohibiting anonymous leafletting unconstitutional, as well as the role of anonymous political literature throughout history, one example being The Federalist Papers. The Court's majority opinion emphasized the importance of anonymous speech, describing it as "not a pernicious, fraudulent practice, but an honorable tradition of advocacy and of dissent". The effect of the Court's opinion on anonymous speech has been analyzed in the contexts of television and radio advertisements, campaign finance, and the Internet.

== Background ==
=== Ohio statute and prior case law ===
The First Amendment to the United States Constitution prevents the federal government from abridging the freedom of speech, and the Fourteenth Amendment extends this prohibition to state governments under the incorporation doctrine. Section 3599.09(A) of the Ohio Revised Code forbade the creation and distribution of any kind of publication "... designed to promote the adoption or defeat of any issue, or to influence the voters in any election ..." unless the publication contains the name and address of the person responsible for the content of the publication." Previously, in a case called State v. Babst (1922), the Supreme Court of Ohio, the state's highest court, upheld the constitutionality of the "statutory predecessor" of section 3599.09(A). However, in Talley v. California (1960), the Supreme Court of the United States held that a similar Los Angeles city ordinance prohibiting all anonymous leafletting was unconstitutional because it violated the First Amendment. (Note: A relevant distinction between McIntyre and Talley is that in Talley, the issue was a city ordinance which prohibited all anonymous leafletting, whereas in McIntyre, the issue was a state statute that was limited solely to campaign literature.)

The U.S. Supreme Court has also discussed whether disclosure of an anonymous individual's identity is permissible in certain situations. In Buckley v. Valeo (1976), the Court upheld, among other things, a part of the Federal Election Campaign Act that required the public disclosure of political campaign contributions above a certain dollar amount. Applying a standard of exacting scrutiny, the Court determined that the government's interest in providing the electorate with information about campaign contributions outweighed the First Amendment concerns in the case of Buckley. In First National Bank of Boston v. Bellotti (1978), the Court invalidated a Massachusetts law that made it a crime to use corporate funds to influence the voters of an election. As part of its analysis, the Court commented that "identification of the source of advertising may be required as a means of disclosure, so that the people will be able to evaluate the arguments to which they are being subjected".

=== Facts of the case ===
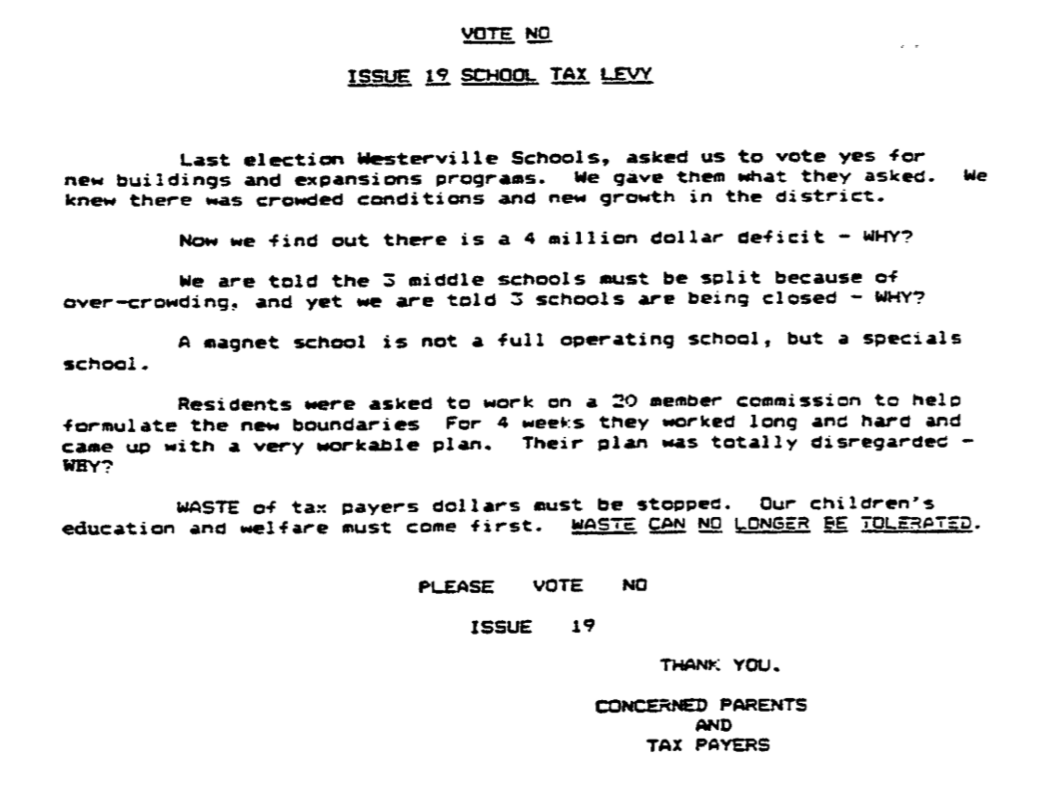
One of the anonymous leaflets passed out by Margaret McIntyre which became the subject of McIntyre v. Ohio Elections Commission

On the evening of April 27, 1988, the superintendent of Westerville City School District held a public meeting at Blendon Middle School in Westerville, Ohio, to discuss a new school district tax levy. On the same day, an Ohioan named Margaret McIntyre stood outside the school and distributed leaflets to meeting attendants, asking them to vote no on the tax levy issue. Some of the leaflets did not identify her as the author, instead identifying the message as coming from "concerned parents and tax payers".

While she was distributing the leaflets, a school official who supported the tax proposal warned McIntyre that her anonymous leaflets were unlawful. Despite the warning, McIntyre continued to distribute the leaflets at a meeting the next day. The tax levy issue failed to pass on its first try. In November 1988, in the third election on which the issue was presented, the tax levy was finally approved. Five months after the levy passed, the same school official who warned McIntyre about her anonymous leaflets filed a complaint with the Ohio Elections Commission, accusing McIntyre of violating section 3599.09(A) of the Ohio Revised Code. The commission found her guilty and fined her $100.

=== Lower court proceedings ===
McIntyre appealed the fine to the Franklin County Court of Common Pleas, which reversed the fine, holding that because McIntyre "did not 'mislead the public nor act in a surreptitious manner'", section 3599.09(A) was unconstitutional as it applied to her actions. McIntyre was represented by David Goldberger, an attorney for the American Civil Liberties Union. The Ohio Court of Appeals reversed that court, putting back the fine. In a divided vote, the majority of the judges felt bound by the precedent set in State v. Babst (1922) by the Supreme Court of Ohio, which upheld the "statutory predecessor" of section 3599.09(A). The judge who dissented from the opinion argued that the U.S. Supreme Court's intervening decision in Talley v. California (1960) "compelled the Ohio court to adopt a narrowing construction of the statute to save its constitutionality". The Ohio Supreme Court affirmed the Court of Appeals, also by a divided vote. The majority of the state supreme court justices felt that the Ohio statute was different from the city ordinance in Talley, finding that section 3599.09(A) "has as its purpose the identification of persons who distribute materials containing false statements". In a dissenting opinion, Justice J. Craig Wright wrote that section 3599.09(A) "'is not narrowly tailored to serve a compelling state interest and is, therefore, unconstitutional as applied to McIntyre.'"

== Supreme Court ==
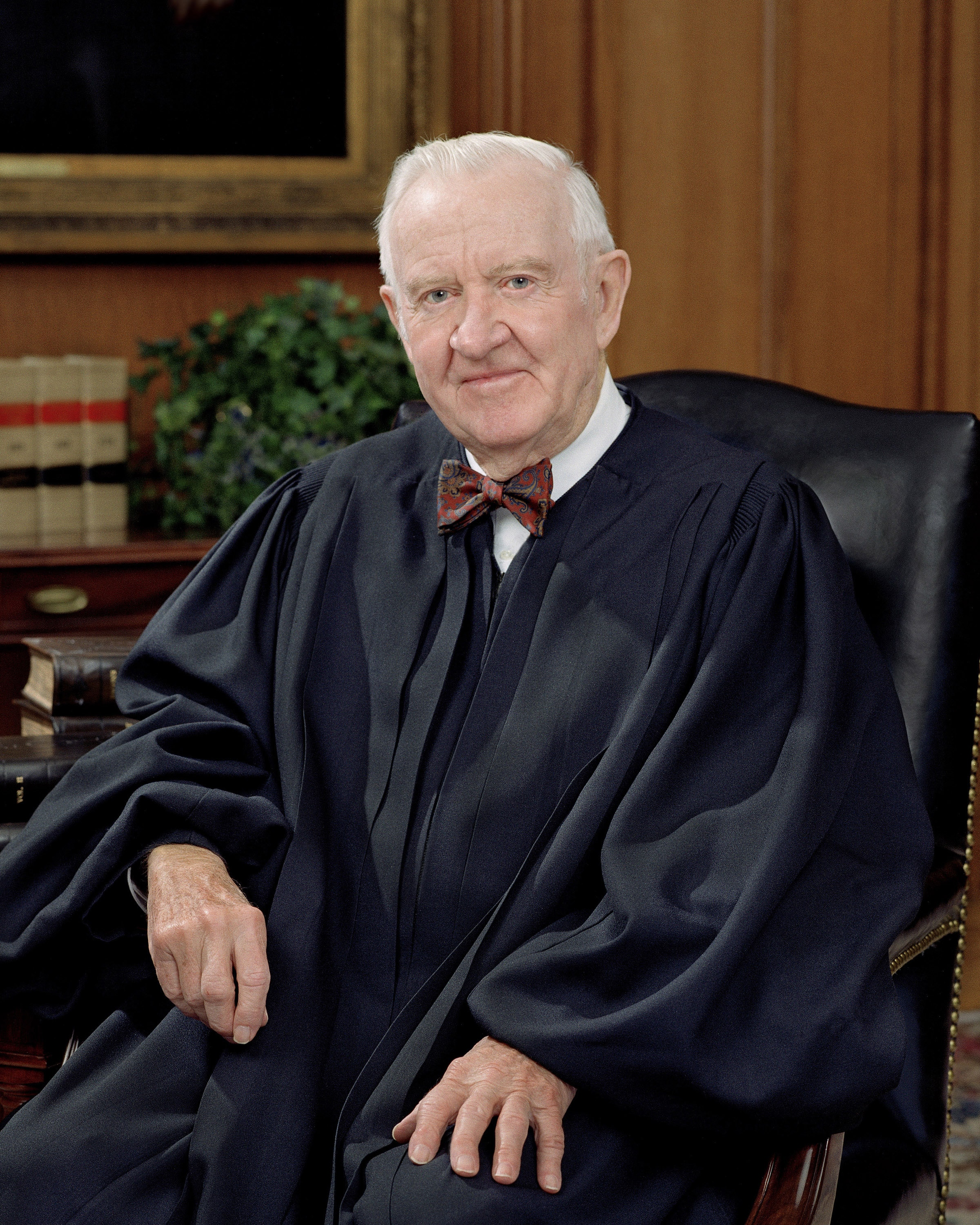
Justice John Paul Stevens, the author of the majority opinion in McIntyre v. Ohio Elections Commission

Margaret McIntyre died while the case was still being litigated in the state courts. On behalf of Joseph McIntyre, the executor of McIntyre's estate, the American Civil Liberties Union filed a petition for a writ of certiorari with the Supreme Court of the United States, which the Court granted on February 22, 1994. Justice Stevens later wrote, "Even though the amount in controversy is only $100", the Court's grant of certiorari "reflects our agreement with [the executor's] appraisal of the importance of the question presented".

=== Opinion of the Court ===
Justice John Paul Stevens delivered the opinion of the Court on April 19, 1995, reversing the Ohio Supreme Court in a 7–2 decision. Stevens emphasized that the First Amendment protects a right to anonymity, referring to Talley as precedent, and stated that Ohio's interests in preventing fraud and informing the electorate were insufficient to justify the sweeping scope of its statute. Stevens also rejected the argument that the Court's prior decisions in Bellotti and Buckley compel the Court to uphold the Ohio statute.

==== Freedom to publish anonymously ====
Under our Constitution, anonymous pamphleteering is not a pernicious, fraudulent practice, but an honorable tradition of advocacy and of dissent. Anonymity is a shield from the tyranny of the majority. It thus exemplifies the purpose behind the Bill of Rights, and of the First Amendment in particular: to protect unpopular individuals from retaliation—and their ideas from suppression—at the hand of an intolerant society. The right to remain anonymous may be abused when it shields fraudulent conduct. But political speech by its nature will sometimes have unpalatable consequences, and, in general, our society accords greater weight to the value of free speech than to the dangers of its misuse.

— Justice John Paul Stevens, McIntyre v. Ohio Elections Commission, 514 U.S. 334 at 357 (citations omitted).

Stevens began his First Amendment analysis by quoting Talley v. California, where the Court wrote: "Anonymous pamphlets, leaflets, brochures and even books have played an important role in the progress of mankind." Stevens noted various well-known authors throughout literary history who had opted to publish either anonymously or under a pseudonym, including Mark Twain, O. Henry, Benjamin Franklin, and Voltaire. He then stated that the "freedom to publish anonymously extends beyond the literary realm", referring to the decision in Talley, as well as The Federalist Papers, a collection of anonymous essays written by Alexander Hamilton, James Madison, and John Jay to promote the ratification of what is now the U.S. Constitution.

In justifying a First Amendment right to anonymity, Stevens wrote that while curiosity might cause a reader to inquire about an author's identity, an author's "decision in favor of anonymity may be motivated by fear of economic or official retaliation, by concern about social ostracism, or merely by a desire to preserve as much of one's privacy as possible". Stevens added that anonymity "provides a way for a writer who may be personally unpopular to ensure that readers will not prejudge her message simply because they do not like its proponent". Stevens concluded that Talley's reasoning "embraced a respected tradition of anonymity in the advocacy of political causes", stating that "this tradition is perhaps best exemplified by the secret ballot, the hard-won right to vote one's conscience without fear of retaliation".

==== Exacting scrutiny standard ====
Because Ohio's law was "a regulation of pure speech" as opposed to a regulation of merely "the mechanics of the electoral process", Stevens applied a standard of "exacting scrutiny", a more rigorous standard of scrutiny than the Ohio Supreme Court had applied. Under this standard, the Court may uphold Ohio's law "only if it is narrowly tailored to serve an overriding state interest". Specifically, Ohio must demonstrate that its stated interests "in preventing fraudulent and libelous statements" and "in providing the electorate with relevant information" are sufficient to justify its law against anonymous campaign literature.

Stevens stated that the interest of "informing the electorate" is "plainly insufficient to support the constitutionality of its disclosure requirement", writing that "the identity of the speaker is no different from other components of the document's content that the author is free to include or exclude". (Note: In rejecting the "informational interest", Stevens also cited the case Miami Herald Publishing Co. v. Tornillo (1974), in which the Court held that the "State may not compel a newspaper that prints editorials critical of a particular candidate to provide space for a reply by the candidate".) On the other hand, Stevens acknowledged that the fraud and libel prevention interest "carries special weight during election campaigns when false statements, if credited, may have serious adverse consequences for the public at large". However, Stevens also commented that Ohio's election laws include "detailed and specific prohibitions against making or disseminating false statements during political campaigns" and that "Ohio's prohibition of anonymous leaflets plainly is not its principal weapon against fraud". Stevens concluded that while Ohio's prohibition may "serve as an aid to enforcement of the specific prohibitions and as a deterrent to the making of false statements by unscrupulous prevaricators", these "ancillary benefits" do not justify the Ohio statute's "extremely broad prohibition", particularly because it "encompasses documents that are not even arguably false or misleading".

==== Bellotti and Buckley ====
Stevens concluded that neither of the Court's prior decisions in First National Bank of Boston v. Bellotti and Buckley v. Valeo is "controlling" in McIntyre. With respect to Bellotti, Stevens clarified that "although we commented in dicta on the prophylactic effect of requiring identification of the source of corporate advertising, that footnote did not necessarily apply to independent communications by an individual like Mrs. McIntyre". Additionally, while Buckley "concerned contributions to [a political] candidate or expenditures by the candidate or his responsible agent", Stevens wrote that the case "had no reference to the kind of independent activity pursued by Mrs. McIntyre".

=== Dissent and concurrence ===
Justice Clarence Thomas filed an opinion concurring in the judgment only. Thomas agreed with the majority opinion that the Ohio law prohibiting anonymous campaign literature was unconstitutional because it violated the First Amendment, but would have applied "a different methodology to this case". Rather than analyze the "tradition" and "value" of anonymous speech in American history, Thomas stated that the Court should instead "determine whether the phrase 'freedom of speech, or of the press,' as originally understood, protected anonymous political leafletting". After analyzing historical evidence, Thomas concluded that the original intent of the First Amendment included a protection of anonymous speech and criticized the majority for adopting "an analysis that is largely unconnected to the Constitution's text and history".

Justice Antonin Scalia filed a dissenting opinion, in which Chief Justice William Rehnquist joined. Scalia rejected the Court's opinion that the First Amendment protects a "right-to-be-unknown while engaging in politics". Responding to the majority and to Justice Thomas, Scalia stated that "to prove that anonymous electioneering was used frequently is not to establish that it is a constitutional right", concluding that there was a scarcity of historical evidence that "anonymous electioneering" was regarded as such by the Framers of the Constitution. In the absence of such evidence, Scalia looked towards "the widespread and longstanding traditions of our people", commenting that laws similar to Ohio's exist in every U.S. state except California and that the history of these laws extends to the nineteenth century. Scalia also concluded that prior case law would also justify upholding Ohio's statute. Specifically, previous cases support that "protection of the election process justifies limitations upon speech that cannot constitutionally be imposed generally" and reject that "a 'right to anonymity' is such a prominent value in our constitutional system that even protection of the electoral process cannot be purchased at its expense". (Note: Scalia cited the cases Wesberry v. Sanders (1964) and Eu v. San Francisco County Democratic Central Committee (1989) to support the view that "no justification for regulation is more compelling than protection of the electoral process". Scalia also stated that the Court had previously rejected "a generalized right of anonymity" in the case Lewis Publishing Co. v. Morgan (1913).) Scalia further stated that "the prohibition of anonymous campaigning is effective in protecting and enhancing democratic elections".

Justice Ruth Bader Ginsburg filed a concurring opinion, in which she responded to Scalia's dissent, emphasizing the narrow scope of the majority's decision: "We do not thereby hold that the State may not in other, larger circumstances, require the speaker to disclose its interest by disclosing its identity."

== Analysis and impact ==
McIntyre has been referred to in analyses of the relationship between anonymous speech and the First Amendment. In an article published in the North Carolina Law Review, Richard K. Norton wrote that the majority opinion in McIntyre "left the jurisprudential door slightly cracked, suggesting the possibility that some kind of acceptable proscription on anonymous speech exists, but gave no indication what such a proscription might look like". Norton argued that McIntyre's "legal analysis does not provide a satisfying exposition of the concerns truly driving the debate, nor does it offer a satisfactory guide for predicting how the Court will rule on future anonymous political speech questions". Responding to Norton's claim, Amy Constantine wrote in a Connecticut Law Review article that "McIntyre nonetheless is an important decision that recognizes a de minimis exception to campaign literature disclosure statutes". Constantine added that "in a broader context, the decision affirms this country's historical commitment to protecting core political speech and protection of the marketplace of ideas metaphor" and "has tremendous ramifications for the forty-eight states, including Connecticut, that have similar disclosure statutes for political campaign literature".

=== Political campaign advertisements ===
At the beginning of 1995, the year the Supreme Court decided McIntyre, all U.S. states (plus the District of Columbia) except California had laws similar to the Ohio law prohibiting anonymous campaign literature. In an analysis published in the Catholic University Law Review, Rachel J. Grabow concluded that "because some of the Court's language in McIntyre is unclear, and the decision leaves unanswered questions, McIntyre's future is difficult to predict". Grabow cited Scalia's dissenting opinion, stating that Scalia had "posited that it was impossible to know whether McIntyre invalidated other existing identification statutes" and that "it would take decades to flesh out the scope of the right to distribute anonymous campaign literature".

Grabow criticized the Court's decision, arguing that "the majority opinion fails to fully consider Ohio's strong interests in preventing fraudulent campaign-related statements and providing information to its electorate". Grabow disagreed with the Court's use of the exacting scrutiny standard in striking down Ohio's law, arguing that other state regulations on the electoral process are reviewed at a lower standard and that "subjecting all election regulations to exacting scrutiny would substantially hinder the states' ability to ensure fair elections". Grabow also argued that even under the exacting scrutiny standard, "the Court underestimated the strength of Ohio's interest in an informed electorate".

==== Television and radio advertisements ====
At the time the Supreme Court decided McIntyre, thirty-one states had laws that required sponsors of political television and radio advertisements to identify themselves in the advertisement. In an analysis published in 1996 by the University of Chicago Law Review, Thomas Dupree Jr. wrote that because of the McIntyre decision "the constitutionality of these statutes has been cast into doubt". However, Dupree qualified that statement by saying that the "precise scope of McIntyre is far from clear" and that "the Court offered little guidance as to the decision's applicability to statutes that regulate a narrower class of speakers—such as candidates for political office—or a communications medium other than print". Dupree stated that he "advocates a narrow interpretation of McIntyre", arguing that "state disclosure laws, narrowly tailored to include only candidates or their agents communicating via broadcast media, remain constitutional after McIntyre". According to Dupree, "Historically, the Court has applied lighter First Amendment scrutiny to restrictions on broadcast communication than to restrictions on print communication". Additionally, Dupree argued that while the Ohio law in question in McIntyre was "overly broad" because it regulated political speech "by all citizens", a narrower statute limited only to political candidates would leave "untouched anonymous speech by private individuals like Mrs. McIntyre, without clearing the way for candidates to engage in anonymous warfare over the airwaves".

=== Campaign finance ===
In an article published in the William & Mary Bill of Rights Journal, legal scholar Richard Briffault commented that even though McIntyre invalidated a disclosure law on constitutional grounds, the decision did not undermine "the Court's general support for the public dissemination of campaign finance information". Briffault commented that in McConnell v. FEC (2003), "the Court easily upheld the extension of disclosure requirements to electioneering communications". According to Briffault, "Justice Thomas's contention in his McConnell dissent that McIntyre changed the constitutional analysis of disclosure and required that disclosure requirements be subject to strict judicial scrutiny was given short shrift by the rest of the Court".

The Court would further distinguish disclosure laws from the Ohio law in McIntyre in subsequent cases such as Citizens United v. FEC (2010) and Doe v. Reed (2010). According to Briffault, "Citizens United also dealt with—and strongly upheld—some of the disclosure provisions of federal campaign finance law, thus, confirming once again that even campaign spending that cannot be limited may be subject to disclosure". In Doe, the Court held that requiring disclosure of signatures on a referendum does not violate the First Amendment.

=== Internet anonymity ===
McIntyre has been cited in cases involving defamation by anonymous Internet users (sometimes described as "cybersmears"). In an analysis published in the Washington and Lee Law Review, Caroline Strickland wrote that although the Court's decision in McIntyre "emphasized a general respect for the anonymous advocacy of political causes, it did not contemplate anonymous unlawful speech such as the Internet postings challenged in cybersmear lawsuits". Strickland stated that "public interest groups, court documents, and legal practitioners often cite McIntyre v. Ohio Elections Commission as an authority for the protection of anonymous Internet speech", but also wrote that "many citations to McIntyre presuppose that its rationale applies in the cybersmear context and fail to address the distinctions between Mrs. McIntyre's speech and alleged cybersmear". Specifically, Strickland stated that the "most blatant misapplications of McIntyre fail to address the fact that McIntyre did not directly contemplate fraudulent, libelous, or otherwise unlawful, anonymous speech". Strickland ultimately concluded that because of these and other distinctions, "neither the First Amendment nor McIntyre protects the intentionally false speech challenged in some cybersmear lawsuits".

Strickland compared McIntyre to two subsequent cases, both concerning requests for a process called "expedited discovery", by which a court can attempt to "facilitate efforts to identify and to serve an unknown defendant". The first was a 2000 case in which a Virginia Circuit Court "used McIntyre in its First Amendment analysis to extend the protection of anonymous speech to the Internet context", but "maintained, however, that the right was not absolute and did not extend to unlawful Internet statements". (Note: Called In re Subpoena Duces Tecum to America Online Inc., the case concerned a corporation that sued five anonymous individuals for allegedly posting defamatory statements about the corporation on the website of AOL, an Internet company based in Virginia. A Virginia Circuit Court issued a subpoena duces tecum to AOL for the defendants' identities, but AOL moved to quash the subpoena, arguing that revealing the defendants' identities would violate the First Amendment. In its decision, the Virginia court held that disclosure would be constitutional "if the plaintiff presented satisfactory pleadings, offered evidence of a legitimate claim, and demonstrated the need for the identity information". Applying this standard, the court "reasoned that Indiana's interest in protecting companies from the potentially severe consequences of actionable Internet communications outweighed the interest in innocent Internet users' First Amendment rights".) The second was Dendrite International, Inc. v. Doe No. 3 (2001), a case in which a New Jersey court denied expedited discovery of the identities of two anonymous individuals. According to Strickland, "The court noted the factual distinctions of McIntyre, yet stated that its general principle – that the First Amendment protects anonymous speech – nevertheless applied".

Jasmine McNealy, an assistant professor at the S. I. Newhouse School of Public Communications at Syracuse University, responded to Strickland's article in a paper published in the First Amendment Law Review, stating that Strickland's conclusion "does not recognize, however, that plaintiffs are asking for the discovery of the defendant's identity before there is an actual adjudication of whether the comments at issue are truly defamatory". McNealy stated that "McIntyre can be viewed as supporting anonymous online speech". However, in an analysis of various anonymous online speech cases that cite McIntyre, McNealy found that "most of the courts citing McIntyre used it as a reference citation, and not as a decision that must be followed or explained". McNealy concluded, "In sum, the influence of the U.S. Supreme Court's decision in McIntyre has not been as significant as thought possible with respect to online anonymous speech."

== See also ==
- National Association for the Advancement of Colored People v. Alabama
- Citizens for Tax Reform v. Deters
- Anderson v. Celebrezze
- Apple v. Does
- Hard Drive Productions, Inc. v. Does 1-1,495
