= United States v. Raines =

- Supreme Court of the United States

Argued January 12, 1960 Decided February 29, 1960
- Full case name: United States v. James Griggs Raines, Dixon Oxford, Roscoe Radford, Registrars of Terrell County, Georgia, F. Lawson Cook, Sr. and Mrs. F. Lawson Cook, Sr., Deputy Registrars
- Citations: 362 U.S. 17 (more) 80 S. Ct. 519; 4 L. Ed. 2d 524

Case history
- Prior: Ruling for plaintiff, 172 F. Supp. 552 (M.D. Ga. 1959)

Holding
- As applied, § 131 of the Civil Rights Act of 1957 is constitutional; the Federal Government can bring civil actions against state officials, insofar as discrimination is concerned.

Court membership
- Chief Justice Earl Warren Associate Justices Hugo Black · Felix Frankfurter; William O. Douglas · Tom C. Clark; John M. Harlan II · William J. Brennan Jr. Charles E. Whittaker · Potter Stewart

Case opinions
- Majority: Brennan, joined by unanimous
- Concurrence: Frankfurter, joined by Harlan

United States v. Raines, 362 U.S. 17 (1960), was a United States Supreme Court decision relating to civil rights. The Court overturned the ruling of a U.S. District Court, which had held that a law authorizing the Federal Government to bring civil actions against State Officials for discriminating against African-Americans citizens was unconstitutional.

Attorney General brought suit to enjoin (issue injunction) against Raines and other Georgia public officials from discriminating against African Americans wanting to vote. District court dismissed the complaint from Raines, et al. because this could be brought by private citizens.

== See also ==
- List of United States Supreme Court cases, volume 362
- Civil Rights Act of 1957
