= United States v. Alabama =

- Supreme Court of the United States

Argued May 2, 1960 Decided May 16, 1960
- Full case name: United States v. Alabama
- Docket no.: 398
- Citations: 362 U.S. 602 (more)

Case history
- Prior: United States v. State of Alabama, 267 F.2d 808 (5th Cir. 1959), United States v. State of Alabama, 171 F. Supp. 720 (M.D. Ala. 1959)

Holding
- A subsequent Civil Rights Act of 1960 of the Civil Rights Act of 1957 allows for the United States to seek relief against unlawful voting practices by states, and thus a district court has jurisdiction even if it previously did not.

Court membership
- Chief Justice Earl Warren Associate Justices Hugo Black · Felix Frankfurter; William O. Douglas · Tom C. Clark; John M. Harlan II · William J. Brennan Jr. Charles E. Whittaker · Potter Stewart

Case opinion
- Per curiam

Laws applied
- Civil Rights Act of 1957, Civil Rights Act of 1960

United States v. Alabama, 325 U.S. 602 (1960), was a Supreme Court case in which the court held that, after the Civil Rights Act of 1960 was signed by President Dwight D. Eisenhower on May 6, 1960, the U.S. District Court for the Middle District of Alabama now had jurisdiction to hear a challenge against Alabama for violations of the Civil Rights Act of 1957. This came about after both the district court and the U.S Court of Appeals for the Fifth Circuit dismissed the case because the Civil Rights Act of 1957 did not authorize the United States to seek relief against a state.

== Historical Context ==
This case begins on February 5, 1959, the United States filed a lawsuit against the Board of Registrars of Macon County, Grady Rogers and E.P. Livingston in their capacity as member of the Board, and the state of Alabama for violations of the Civil Rights Act of 1957. The case was filed in the U.S. District Court for the Middle District of Alabama, but was dismissed on March 6, 1959, by Judge Frank M. Johnson because, among other reasons, 42 U.S. Code § 1971 (which has since been moved) did not apply to the State of Alabama or to the "Board of Registrars" because it states,

"Whenever any person has engaged or there are reasonable grounds to believe that any person is about to engage in any act or practice which would deprive any other person of any right or privilege..."

The argument being, the statute says person, instead of "state" or "entity", although the Board of Registrars also argued it was not a suable entity regardless. There was also considerable argument and consideration on the point that since both Rogers and Livingston resigned, they could not be sued in an official capacity. Johnson on the previous point, said,

"The Court must presume, therefore, that Congress in using only the word "person" deliberately restricted the authority of the Attorney General to institute such actions."

=== Court of Appeals ===
The United States appealed the district court's to the U.S. Court of Appeals for the Fifth Circuit (which at that point included Alabama), which accepted the case released its decision on June 16, 1959. Chief Judge Joseph C. Hutcheson wrote the opinion, in which Judge Benjamin F. Cameron and Judge Warren Jones joined, in which the court affirmed the district court's decision. The opinion can be summarized as follows,

"[I]t is sufficient for us to simply say that, under the principle which has been, and still is, controlling upon the federal courts, whatever congress might or could do in providing in a civil rights action for conferring federal court jurisdiction over a state, it has never heretofore done so..[and] [a]bsent such specific conferring of jurisdiction, a federal court would not, indeed could not assume jurisdiction over a sovereign state without a precedent determination...Reading the statute as one will, such an implication cannot be found in it. For it cannot be reasonably contended that the congress intended in a situation of this kind."

"We thus come to the second specification of error that, though, as the district judge expressly found, the two sued as board members, had, some two months before the suit was brought, in good faith resigned their offices and each has taken another state office, they can and should be treated as still members of the board..we are of the clear opinion that the reasons given by the district judge for rejecting this contention of plaintiff-appellant are sound, indeed unanswerable, and that we approve and adopt them."

"Of the third and final specification, that the Board of Registrars, without members to be sued or served, constituted a legal entity which must stand in judgment in this suit...[S]uing a board having no members is as inconceivable in law as suing, as members of a board, persons who are not such."

The United States subsequently filed a petition for a writ of certiorari with the Supreme Court of the United States, which was granted.

== Supreme Court Decision ==
The United States Supreme Court proceeded to hold oral arguments on May 2, 1960, and released its opinion on May 16, 1960. However, only four days later, President Dwight D. Eisenhower signed into law the Civil Rights Act of 1960, which amended the Civil Rights Act of 1957 to remedy the grounds upon which the suit was originally dismissed. It accomplished this by adding the following text to the statute,

"Whenever, in a proceeding instituted under this subsection any official of a State or subdivision thereof is alleged to have committed any act or practice constituting a deprivation of any right or privilege secured by subsection (a), the act or practice shall also be deemed that of the State and the State may be joined as a party defendant and, if, prior to the institution of such proceeding, such official has resigned or has been relieved of his office and no successor has assumed such office, the proceeding may be instituted against the State."

The Supreme Court based its opinion based upon this fact, stating in the syllabus that the "amendment, which is to be applied to this case, the District Court now has jurisdiction to entertain this action against the State." The per curiam decision appeared to take the case to largely vacate the previous proceedings, stating,

"Because of the importance of the issues involved, we brought the case here...Under familiar principles, the case must be decided on the basis of law now controlling, and the provisions of § 601(b) are applicable to this litigation. We hold that, by virtue of the provisions of that section, the District Court has jurisdiction to entertain this action against the State. "

This point is further reinforced by the fact the court refused to make any decision as to the actual merits of the case, stating,

"In so holding, we do not reach, or intimate any view upon, any of the issues decided below, the merits of the controversy, or any defenses, constitutional or otherwise, that may be asserted by the State."
