= Hard Drive Productions, Inc. v. Does 1–1,495 =

- Court: United States District Court for the District of Columbia
- Decided: DISMISSED on December 21, 2012.
- Defendant: John Does 1–1,495
- Prosecution: Hard Drive Productions, Inc.
- Citation: Civil Action No. 11-1741 (JDB/JMF)

Holding
- The defendants could not proceed anonymously.

Court membership
- Judges sitting: John D. Bates, John M. Facciola

Keywords
- BitTorrent, First Amendment, Right to anonymous speech

Hard Drive Productions, Inc. v. Does 1–1,495, Civil Action No. 11-1741 (JDB/JMF), was a United States District Court for the District of Columbia case in which the court held that anonymous users of the peer-to-peer file sharing service BitTorrent could not remain anonymous after charges of copyright infringement were brought against them. The court ultimately dismissed the case, but the identities of defendants were publicly exposed.

== Background ==
Hard Drive Productions, Inc., is an adult film studio with a history of suing anonymous "John Doe" defendants for copyright infringement. On September 27, 2011, Hard Drive Productions sued 1,495 anonymous defendants for copyright infringement in Hard Drive Productions, Inc. v. Does 1–1,495. Hard Drive Productions claimed that the defendants had used BitTorrent to illegally download and distribute its movie "Amateur Alleur—MaeLynn."

A prominent feature of this case the defendants' right to anonymous speech. Hard Drive Productions knew the IP addresses assigned to each defendant by their Internet service provider (ISP), however the plaintiff had no information about the true identities of these individuals. Hard Drive Productions moved to compel the ISPs by subpoena to disclose the true identities of the defendants. The court granted the motion, which would force the ISPs to disclose the defendants' identities. The defendants moved to quash this subpoena. For administrative reasons, some of the defendants submitted their name and address with their motions to quash. These were filed under seal to protect their identities from the public.

Subsequently, the Electronic Frontier Foundation (EFF), an organization that advocates internet users' anonymity and other rights in the digital world, sent an amicus curiae and requested an emergency stay—a motion that would halt action so that the order could be reconsidered. The EFF mainly argued that the order did not consider the defendants' First Amendment right to anonymous speech. The court eventually denied the EFF's motion for emergency stay and reconsideration and ordered unsealing of all sealed motions to quash. Thus, the identities of the defendants were disclosed to the public.

== Opinion of the Court ==
=== On Hard Drive Productions's motion to compel ===
On August 13, 2012, the court held that the defendants could not proceed anonymously. The court noted that there was no privilege recognized by law that would protect the identity of the Does from being disclosed to the plaintiff for the purposes sought, and that without the ability to obtain the Does' identities, the copyright holders would have been left without a means of identifying the individuals who violated its rights.

The plaintiff was seeking subscriber information for particular IP addresses, and the use of that information had already been restricted by the court: "Any information disclosed to Hard Drive in response to the Rule 45 subpoenas may be used by Hard Drive solely for the purpose of protecting its rights as set forth in the Complaint, and Hard Drive may not publicly disclose the names of the defendants."

The defendants filed motions to quash the subpoena, but they were denied for multiple reasons. First, because the defendants moved anonymously, their motions could not officially become part of the Court file. According to Rule 5.1 of the court's local rules, "The first filing by or on behalf of a party shall have in the caption the name and full residence address of the party." Second, since the subpoena was for the defendants' ISPs and not the defendants themselves, the defendants had no standing to quash the subpoena. Third, the court argued that, at the time, the movants were not yet considered as defendants.

=== On the EFF's stay motion ===
The court released a memorandum regarding the EFF's amicus curiae and denied its stay motion on September 26, 2012.

In this opinion, court applied the 5-part balancing test adopted in Sony Music Entertainment, Inc. v. Does 1–40, 326 F. Supp. 2d 556 (S.D.N.Y. 2004) and found that all five factors supported the disclosure of the defendants' identities:

1. Plaintiff's concrete showing of a prima facie claim of copyright infringement—Hard Drive Productions made a concrete showing of a prima facie claim of copyright infringement.
2. Specificity of the plaintiff's discovery request—Hard Drive Productions's discovery request was sufficiently specific to gain only the information needed to identify the defendants and nothing more.
3. Absence of alternative means to gain the information plaintiff seeks—subpoenaing the ISPs appeared to be the only way for the plaintiff to obtain the defendants' identities because only the ISPs have records of the IP addresses assigned to users on the date and at the time of each allegedly infringing act.
4. Plaintiff's need for the information to advance its claim—without the defendants' identifying information, the plaintiff could not name or serve process on the defendants and hence cannot advance its claims of copyright infringement.
5. Defendants' expectation of privacy—defendants had little expectation of privacy in the subscriber information that they had already given to their ISPs.

Because all of the five Sony factors supported disclosure of the defendants' identities, the court found that the plaintiff's need for the defendants' identities in pursuit its claims outweighed the defendants' First Amendment interest in anonymity.

== Subsequent developments ==
On December 21, 2012, the case was dismissed in its entirety without prejudice, but the plaintiff could still file a new lawsuit in other jurisdictions until the statute of limitation has expired.

Eric Goldman criticized the court for allowing copyright plaintiffs to unmask the identities of the defendants too easily. As a result of the disclosure, the defendants lost their essential due process rights. In practice, once the plaintiff knew the identities of defendants, it could take advantage of substantial extrajudicial remedies such as public humiliation in porn copyright cases. Goldman claimed that this ruling unfairly favored the plaintiff over the anonymous defendants.

After the case was dismissed, Hard Drive Productions was involved in another lawsuit related to this case. On February 16, 2013, Nathan Abshire, one of the defendants in Hard Drive Productions, Inc. v. Does 1–1,495, filed a new lawsuit (MND 13-cv-00380) against Hard Drive Productions. Abshire alleged that after the disclosing of the Does' identities in September 2012, Hard Drive Productions, Inc. began harassing Nathan over the phone and continued to propose various unacceptable settlement proposals. The complaint primarily requested that the court issue an order declaring that Abshire not be liable for copyright infringement, that Hard Drive Productions's purported copyright on its work was unenforceable or invalid. It also requested that Abshire be awarded costs, disbursements, and expenses, including reasonable attorney fees.

== See also ==
- McIntyre v. Ohio Elections Commission
- Apple v. Does
