= Thompson v. City of Louisville =

- Supreme Court of the United States

Argued January 11–12, 1960 Decided March 21, 1960
- Full case name: Sam Thompson v. City of Louisville, et al.
- Citations: 362 U.S. 199 (more) 80 S. Ct. 624; 4 L. Ed. 2d 654; 1960 U.S. LEXIS 1448; 80 A.L.R.2d 1355

Holding
- On the record in this case, Thompson's conviction for loitering and disorderly conduct was so totally devoid of evidentiary support as to be invalid under the Due Process Clause of the Fourteenth Amendment.

Court membership
- Chief Justice Earl Warren Associate Justices Hugo Black · Felix Frankfurter; William O. Douglas · Tom C. Clark; John M. Harlan II · William J. Brennan Jr. Charles E. Whittaker · Potter Stewart

Case opinion
- Majority: Black, joined by unanimous

Laws applied
- U.S. Const. amend. XIV

Thompson v. City of Louisville, 362 U.S. 199 (1960), was a decision of the United States Supreme Court in which the Court unanimously held that it is a violation of due process to convict a person of an offense when there is no evidence of his guilt. It is one of the rare instances of the Supreme Court's granting certiorari to review a decision of a court so insignificant (the Police Court of Louisville, Kentucky) that state law does not provide any mechanism for appeals from its judgments.

The case is sometimes referred to as the "Shuffling Sam" case, because the petitioner Sam Thompson was known locally as "Shuffling Sam." The Court noted, "There is no evidence that anyone else in the cafe objected to petitioner's shuffling his feet in rhythm with the music of the jukebox."

Associate Justice Hugo Black delivered the opinion of the court. The case was briefed and argued for Thompson by several notable former Supreme Court law clerks.

== Background ==
=== Arrest and proceedings in lower court ===
As stated in the opinion of the Supreme Court, Sam Thompson went into the Liberty End Café in Louisville on a Saturday evening. Two policemen came into the café and observed Sam "out there on the floor dancing by himself." The officers accosted Thompson and asked him what he was doing, "and he said he was waiting on a bus." The officers then arrested him for loitering, and took him outside. Thompson remonstrated – he "was very argumentative – he argued with us back and forth, and so then we placed a disorderly conduct charge on him." That was the entire record that the prosecution put on at the trial, except for a record showing a total of 54 previous arrests.

The Louisville city ordinance under which petitioner was convicted of loitering reads as follows:

"It shall be unlawful for any person . . . , without visible means of support, or who cannot give a satisfactory account of himself, . . . to sleep, lie, loaf, or trespass in or about any premises, building, or other structure in the City of Louisville, without first having obtained the consent of the owner or controller of said premises, structure, or building; . . ."

Thompson's counsel unsuccessfully sought dismissal of the charges on the ground that a judgment of conviction on this record would deprive Thompson of property and liberty without due process of law under the Fourteenth Amendment, in that there was no evidence to support findings of guilt.

Thompson then put in evidence that he was waiting for a bus to his home that was due in an hour or less, that he was a regular customer at the café, and that he was not unwelcome in the café. There was no evidence that "anyone else in the café objected to [Sam's] shuffling his feet in rhythm with the music of the jukebox, or that his conduct was boisterous or offensive to anyone present."

The Police Court found Thompson guilty of both charges and fined him $10 on each charge.

=== Procedural issues concerning appellate review ===
Police court fines of less than $20 on a single charge are not appealable or otherwise reviewable in any other Kentucky court. Thompson's counsel therefore asked the police court to stay the judgments so that he might have an opportunity to apply for certiorari to the U.S. Supreme Court to review the due process contentions he raised. The police court suspended judgment for 24 hours, during which time a longer stay from the Kentucky Circuit Court was sought. That court, after examining the police court's judgment and transcript, granted a stay, concluding that "there appears to be merit" in the contention that "there is no evidence upon which conviction and sentence by the Police Court could be based."

The city then sought to appeal, and the Kentucky Court of Appeals held that the Circuit Court lacked the power to grant the stay that it had granted, but the Court of Appeals sua sponte granted its own stay, because Thompson "appears to have a real question as to whether he has been denied due process under the Fourteenth Amendment of the Federal Constitution, yet this substantive right cannot be tested unless we grant him a stay of execution because his fines are not appealable and will be satisfied by being served in jail before he can prepare and file his petition for certiorari. Appellee's substantive right of due process is of no avail to him unless this court grants him the ancillary right whereby he may test same in the Supreme Court." The U.S. Supreme Court then granted certiorari.

== Opinion of the Court ==
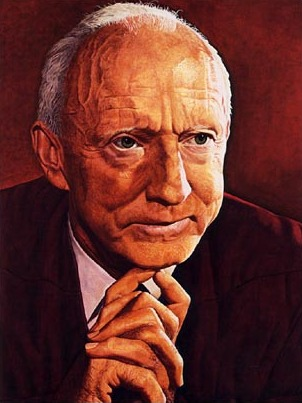
Justice Hugo Black delivered the unanimous opinion of the Court that it violated due process to convict and punish Shuffling Sam without any evidence of his guilt

The Supreme Court reviewed the evidentiary record and found "no evidence whatever in the record to support these convictions." It then held that it is "a violation of due process to convict and punish a man without evidence of his guilt." The Supreme Court did not state whether the state's action violated procedural or substantive due process, but it is generally considered that the Court found a violation of substantive due process.

== Subsequent developments ==
A commentator criticized the Court's opinion as "mak[ing] a deep incursion upon basic principles of federalism" by re-characterizing evidence of conduct that the Court deemed protected activity as "no evidence" of crime.

According to Court Listener, this case has been cited approximately 16,000 times as of July 2015.
