= Smith v. California =

- Supreme Court of the United States

Argued October 20, 1959 Decided December 14, 1959
- Full case name: Eleazar Smith, et al. v. State of California
- Citations: 361 U.S. 147 (more) 80 S. Ct. 215; 4 L. Ed. 2d 205

Case history
- Prior: Defendant found criminally liable for possessing obscene books, violating city ordinance

Holding
- Ordinance violated Due Process Clause of Fourteenth Amendment because it did not contain any element of the scienter

Court membership
- Chief Justice Earl Warren Associate Justices Hugo Black · Felix Frankfurter; William O. Douglas · Tom C. Clark; John M. Harlan II · William J. Brennan Jr. Charles E. Whittaker · Potter Stewart

Case opinions
- Majority: Brennan
- Concurrence: Black
- Concurrence: Frankfurter
- Concurrence: Douglas
- Dissent: Harlan

Laws applied
- U.S. Const. Amend. XIV

Smith v. California, 361 U.S. 147 (1959), was a U.S. Supreme Court case upholding the freedom of the press. The decision deemed unconstitutional a city ordinance that made one in possession of obscene books criminally liable because it did not require proof that one had knowledge of the book's content, and thus violated the freedom of the press guaranteed in the First Amendment. Smith v. California continued the Supreme Court precedent of ruling that questions of freedom of expression were protected by the Due Process Clause of the Fourteenth Amendment from invasion by state action. It also established that in order for one to be criminally liable for possession of obscene material, there must be proof of one's knowledge of the material. It described that by requiring booksellers to know the contents of all of the books that they sell, this would lead to the government compelling booksellers to self-censor thereby restricting the public's access to books which the State could not constitutionally suppress directly.

== Background ==
=== Historical context ===
In the 1950s, many cases that dealt with freedom of expression came to the Supreme Court. The social and cultural effects of the Cold War had infringed upon, if not taken away, many of these freedoms, as all kinds of literature and other forms of expression were being carefully monitored. The era saw the rise of McCarthyism, where techniques as undemocratic as guilt by association, indiscriminate violation of privacy and unsupported accusations were used to censor the general population. It also saw the beginnings of the similar HUAC, or House Un-American Activities Committee, which carried out thousands of investigations into potentially communist activity in America. Many of its methods were highly unconstitutional, and the HUAC was responsible for the creation of the Hollywood blacklist. The material in question in Smith v. California did not have to do with matters of foreign affairs, but with obscenity. The outcome of Smith v. California was one that further supported the protection of freedom of the press guaranteed in the constitution. This trend in Supreme Court decisions would influence the coming Civil Rights Movement.

=== Case background ===
Eleazar Smith, proprietor of a Los Angeles bookstore, was convicted of violating a city ordinance that made it unlawful "for any person to have in his possession any obscene or indecent writing, [or] book ... in any place of business where ... books ... are sold or kept for sale." California municipal and superior courts contended that Smith was criminally liable because of the possession of the obscene material, even though he had no knowledge of the contents of the book; in the law's definition there was no acknowledgement of the scienter (intent or knowledge of criminal activity), and so the ordinance imposed a strict criminal liability. The appellant appealed on the grounds that if the law were in fact constructed this way, it would come into conflict with the Due Process Clause in the Fourteenth Amendment of the United States Constitution.

== Supreme Court opinion ==
=== Summary of majority opinion ===
The court found that the city ordinance that held Mr. Smith criminally liable was in violation of the freedom of the press, which was protected under the Due Process Clause of the Fourteenth Amendment.

The court held that the free publication and distribution of books are protected under the constitution's guarantee of freedom of the press, and that a bookseller, such as Eleazar Smith, plays a key role in this publication and distribution. The court also cited that legal doctrines and devices are not capable of application under the constitution if they would have the effect of inhibiting freedom of expression by making citizens afraid or reluctant to exercise that freedom.

Further, although the constitution does not protect obscene material, the court deemed that the ordinance imposed an unconstitutional limitation on access to constitutionally protected material. This opinion was based on the belief that if booksellers were to be criminally liable without knowledge of content, they would restrict the books they sold to those that they had personally inspected. This would inevitably decrease the number of books being sold, and thus a limitation of public access would be imposed by States on books that were not obscene as well as obscene material. The court also was of the opinion that the ordinance contained no acknowledgement of the scienter, which was necessary for one to be criminally liable for possessing obscene material.

The court's decision concluded that constitutional barriers may exist to restrict a State's power to prevent distribution of obscene materials. Further, the court found that the higher difficulty of restricting distribution of obscene material (because the bookseller is not criminally liable) was not reason enough to require a different decision. It closed saying that it was of great importance to protect freedom of speech and press from State interference, and the ordinance in question was exactly that, and thus it was deemed unconstitutional.

=== Concurring opinion ===
The court made it clear that the issue of obscenity did not factor into its decision. What mattered was that the ordinance made booksellers criminally liable for the mere possession of obscene books in their stores, without having proof that the bookseller had knowledge of the contents. This was found to be in violation of the Due Process Clause of the Fourteenth Amendment.

It also stated that it consented to the fact that having obscene material could be seen as a criminal offense, but not without proof of the scienter. What constitutes proof of the scienter was something that troubled the court, but it was established that it would be a topic for another time.

=== Influence of previous Supreme Court decisions ===
In Near v. Minnesota, a similar 1931 case, Chief Justice Charles E. Hughes concluded that the first amendment alone did not fully protect a citizen's right to freedom of expression from invasion by state action, and that these liberties were protected by the Due Process Clause in the Fourteenth Amendment. This became the opinion of the court in subsequent cases involving freedom of expression. Joseph Burstyn, Inc. v. Wilson (1952), and Grosjean v. American Press Co. (1936) affirmed that the free publication of books or other forms of printed word also fell under the protection of the Due Process Clause.

Dennis v. United States (1951) found that "The existence of a mens rea is the rule of, rather than the exception to, the principles of Anglo-American criminal jurisprudence." Wieman v. Updegraff (1952) supported that the Due Process Clause requires that individuals have scienter. Lambert v. California (1957) deemed that in order for a defendant to be punished for a crime, there must be a probability of his knowledge of the law before committing the crime.

Thornhill v. Alabama (1940) concluded that the separability of constitutional and unconstitutional applications of statutes may not apply if their effect is to leave a statute capable of having many unconstitutional applications.

Roth v. United States (1957) stated that obscene speech and writings are not protected under the constitution.

Dean Milk Co. v. City of Madison, Wisconsin (1951) showed that a state's power to restrict or prevent the distribution of obscene materials is not free from constitutional restrictions to any form of exercise of that power.

=== Dissenting opinion ===
In the view of Justice Harlan, the question of whether the scienter is a necessary requirement to have criminal liability should be considered differently depending on whether the statute in question in at the Federal or State level. He was unconvinced by the court's reasoning and believed that the ordinance was struck down based on generalities. The popular opinion of the court deemed that the ordinance should be removed because, without proof of the scienter, it would impose a limitation on material both obscene and not obscene. Justice Harlan disagreed with this claim and thought it to be more theoretical than practical. He also believed that the ordinance was not unconstitutionally applied merely because of the state's refusal to admit expert testimony.

== Historical significance and influence on subsequent Supreme Court decisions ==
Smith v. California set the precedent of the necessity of the inclusion of the scienter in obscenity statutes, and in doing so it further established that the Due Process Clause of the Fourteenth Amendment would stand to protect freedom of expression from state interference. This decision made it safe and easy for book distributors to continue to disseminate the highest amount of written material that they could, which benefitted the general public by giving them access to as much as possible. Smith v. California became another decision that supported and protected freedom of expression, a fundamental liberty for Americans. The decision was cited in a number of subsequent cases involving the first amendment and criminal liability with obscenity issues. In Redrup v. New York (1967), Ginsberg v. New York (1967), and Stanley v. Georgia (1969), among others, the Supreme Court referenced Smith v. California when presenting the reasoning for its decision. As more and more case decisions have followed the same precedents of protecting freedom of expression that Smith v. California did, the issue of obscenity has become less significant in the United States today.
