= Anonymous Online Speakers v. United States District Court for the District of Nevada =

Court decision about anonymous posts on the Internet

- Court: United States Court of Appeals for the Ninth Circuit
- Decided: July 12, 2010
- Citation: 611 F.3d 653, 38 Media L. Rep. 2057,No. 09-71265

Case history
- Prior actions: Quixtar Inc. v. Signature Management Team, LLC
- Appealed from: United States District Court for the District of Nevada
- Subsequent actions: Opinion withdrawn and replaced by opinion issued January 7, 2011.

Court membership
- Judge sitting: Sidney Runyan Thomas M. Margaret McKeown Jay Bybee

Case opinions
- Cahill standard is too stringent and should not be applied to First Amendment claims of anonymous online speakers involving commercial speech.
- Decision by: M. Margaret McKeown

Keywords
- First Amendment; Anonymous speech

Anonymous Online Speakers v. United States District Court for the District of Nevada (In re Anonymous Online Speakers), 611 F.3d 653 (2010), is a decision by the U.S. Court of Appeals for the Ninth Circuit lowering the standard a plaintiff must meet to compel identification of anonymous posters on the Internet.

Quixtar, Inc. sued its competitor Signature Management TEAM, LLC for tortious interference with existing contracts. Quixtar claimed that TEAM created an Internet smear campaign involving anonymous postings of content that discredited Quixtar and its business practices. The district court ordered TEAM to identify three of the five anonymous authors who posted content about Quixtar. The Anonymous Online Speakers petitioned to the Ninth Circuit, challenging the district court's order. Quixtar cross petitioned to the Ninth Circuit for a writ of mandamus which, if granted, would force TEAM to identify the remaining speakers. Since neither Quixtar nor TEAM demonstrated "an entitlement to the extraordinary relief" that would be granted by the writ, both parties were denied their requested petitions.

The Ninth Circuit recognized that First Amendment protection applied to online speech. The Ninth Circuit decided that the nature of the speech should determine the standard used to protect online speakers and their speech. Historically, courts have awarded greater protection for political speech than commercial speech. The Ninth Circuit classified the Internet postings and video content as commercial speech because they went to "the heart of Quixtar's commercial practices and its business operations."

The district court, in this case, used the Cahill standard which required that parties "submit sufficient evidence to establish a prima facie case for each essential element of the defamation claim." The Ninth Circuit, rejected the application based on the stringency of the test as applied to commercial speech, thereby denying the Anonymous Online Speakers their petition.

Anonymous Online Speakers v. United States District Court for the District of Nevada presented an issue of first impression in the Ninth Circuit regarding First Amendment claims of anonymous online speakers involving commercial speech. The Ninth Circuit instructed lower courts not to apply heightened standard, such as Cahill, to commercial speech during discovery disputes.

== Background ==
As stated in the court's decision, "Quixtar [was] a multilevel marketing business that distribut[ed] cosmetics and nutrition supplements through Independent Business Owners ("IBOs")." Quixtar sued its competitor, Signature Management TEAM, for tortious interference with existing contracts in the U.S. District Court of Nevada Reno. Quixtar accused TEAM for organizing a "smear campaign" on the Internet to induce Quixtar IBOs to terminate their contracts at Quixtar and to join its competitor affiliated with TEAM.

During discovery, Quixtar requested TEAM to identify authors of the anonymous statements made in one video and four blogs. Examples of these statements are "Quixtar has regularly, but secretly, acknowledged that its products are overpriced and not sellable"; "Quixtar refused to pay bonuses to IBOs in good standard" and Quixtar "terminated IBOs without due process." Quixtar alleged that these statements would support its claims for tortious interference with existing contracts because they are made by TEAM employees or agents. TEAM refused to disclose the identities on First Amendment grounds. After reviewing the specific statements from each source, the district court ordered TEAM to identify three of the five anonymous speakers.

== Ninth Circuit opinion ==
In deciding on protections for anonymous speech, the Ninth Circuit cited Talley v. California, which held that First Amendment protection applied to anonymous speech. It further explained the historical purpose of protecting such speech and referred to the anonymously published Federalist and Anti-Federalist papers, both of which were instrumental during the infancy of the United States and the formation of its Constitution. The court also elaborated on the issue by explaining that First Amendment protections are crucial to the "robust exchange of ideas" without "fear of economic or official retaliation." However, McIntyre v. Ohio Elections Commission showed that the tradition of protecting anonymous speech primarily applied to political causes, not necessarily commercial speech. The Ninth Circuit, therefore, stated that the right to free speech is necessarily limited by the circumstances and type of speech at issue.

After reviewing the posted content in the case, the court classified the anonymous postings and videos as commercial speech. For this reason, the Ninth Circuit rejected the district court's application of the Cahill standard applied by the lower court, because the case did not involve commercial speech, but political speech.

The court looked to three cases that involved applying protection standards for anonymous speech: Perry v. Schwarzenegger, 591 F.3d 1147 (2010), NLRB v. Midland Daily News, 151 F.3d 472 (1998), and Lefkoe v. Jos. A. Bank Clothiers, Inc., 577 F.3d 240 (2009). In Perry, the court considered granting a petition for mandamus regarding a discovery order for the disclosure of political campaign information. The Ninth Circuit determined that the lower court erred in determining that first amendment protections are not applicable to the disclosure of internal campaign communications. It further held that allowing discovery of this communication would have "a chilling effect on political association." In NLRB v. Midland Daily News, the Sixth Circuit upheld the quashing of a subpoena seeking the identity of an anonymous advertiser. And in Lefkoe v. Jos. A. Bank Clothiers, Inc., the Fourth Circuit considered whether to allow a deposition of an anonymous speaker in a class action suit. In these cases, what was at issue was commercial speech, however, as stated by the Ninth Circuit, other circuit courts have not followed any standards aside from the "long standing precepts governing commercial speech."

On the grounds that the anonymous postings constituted commercial speech, the Ninth Circuit rejected the district court's application of the Cahill standard. The Cahill standard requires the plaintiff to win a hypothetical motion for summary judgment. Under this standard, a plaintiff must submit sufficient evidence to establish a prima facie case before discovering the identities of anonymous speakers. The Ninth Circuit explained that Cahill is a heightened standard because Cahill involved political speech. Therefore, the Court held that the Cahill standard to bar disclosure should not be applied to the commercial speech in this case.

The Ninth Circuit applied the clear error standard to review the district court's decision. The clear error standard is highly deferential and is only met when "the reviewing court is left with a 'definite and firm conviction that a mistake has been committed'" by the district court. Although the district court imposed the heightened Cahill standard for disclosure, the Ninth Circuit ruled that there was no clear error. It further explained that even if there was an error, the error did not affect the outcome of the case. The Ninth Circuit denied the Anonymous Online Speakers petition and upheld the district court decision. It further instructed the district court to determine the scope and procedure for disclosing the identities of the anonymous speakers.

== Significance ==
Anonymous Online Speakers is a case of first impression in the Ninth Circuit on the issue of First Amendment claims of anonymous online speakers involving commercial speech. The Ninth Circuit lowered the standard for plaintiffs who attempt to identify anonymous online speakers during discovery. This case indicates that lower courts within the Ninth Circuit should not apply a heightened standard, such as Cahill, to commercial speech in discovery disputes. Nevertheless, this case leaves some questions unanswered. The Ninth Circuit has yet to define the appropriate standard for commercial speech in discovery disputes.

The Ninth Circuit's decision in this case will likely be influential. Many "subpoena targets" such as Google, Yahoo! and Bing are located in the Ninth Circuit and are therefore affected by the decision in Anonymous Online Speakers. Only the Fourth and Sixth Circuits have previously addressed anonymous online commercial speech. Other courts that have not decided on this issue may look to the Ninth Circuit that oversees lawsuits involving major Internet and technology companies.

== See also ==
- Anonymity on the Internet
- Anonymous post
