= Parker v. Ellis =

- Supreme Court of the United States

Argued January 20, 1960 Decided May 16, 1960
- Full case name: Parker v. Ellis
- Citations: 362 U.S. 574 (more) 80 S. Ct. 909; 4 L. Ed. 2d 963; 1960 U.S. LEXIS 1931

Holding
- The case was now moot; therefore the court had no jurisdiction to evaluate the merits of petitioner's claim. The writ of certiorari was dismissed for lack of jurisdiction.

Court membership
- Chief Justice Earl Warren Associate Justices Hugo Black · Felix Frankfurter; William O. Douglas · Tom C. Clark; John M. Harlan II · William J. Brennan Jr. Charles E. Whittaker · Potter Stewart

Case opinions
- Per curiam
- Concurrence: Harlan, joined by Clark
- Dissent: Warren, joined by Douglas, Black, Brennan
- Dissent: Douglas, joined by Warren
- Overruled by
- Carafas v. LaVallee, 391 U.S. 234 (1968)

Parker v. Ellis, 362 U.S. 574 (1960), was a United States Supreme Court decision (per curiam) in which the court granted certiorari to review dismissal of petitioner's application for a habeas corpus review. The petitioner claimed that his conviction in a state court had violated the Fourteenth Amendment's Due Process Clause. However, the petitioner was released from incarceration before his case could be heard.

== Decision ==
The court held that the case was now moot; therefore the court had no jurisdiction to evaluate the merits of petitioner's claim. The writ of certiorari was dismissed for lack of jurisdiction.

== See also ==
- List of United States Supreme Court cases, volume 362
- Jones v. Cunningham, 371 U.S. 236 (1963)
