= List of United States Supreme Court cases, volume 362 =

This is a list of all the United States Supreme Court cases from volume 362 of the United States Reports:

Case name	Citation	Date decided
Nelson v. Los Angeles Cnty.	362 U.S. 1	1960
United States v. Raines	362 U.S. 17	1960
United States v. Parke, Davis & Co.	362 U.S. 29	1960
United States v. Thomas	362 U.S. 58	1960
Talley v. California	362 U.S. 60	1960
Florida Lime & Avocado Growers, Inc. v. Jacobsen	362 U.S. 73	1960
FPC v. Tuscarora Indian Nation	362 U.S. 99	1960
Sublett v. Adams	362 U.S. 143	1960
Corso v. Security-First Nat'l Bank	362 U.S. 144	1960
Flora v. United States	362 U.S. 145	1960
Thompson v. City of Louisville	362 U.S. 199	1960
Scripto, Inc. v. Carson	362 U.S. 207	1960
McGann v. United States	362 U.S. 214	1960
City of Covington v. Pub. Serv. Comm'n	362 U.S. 215	1960
Smith v. Columbia Cnty.	362 U.S. 215	1960
Willis v. United States	362 U.S. 216	1960
Abel v. United States	362 U.S. 217	1960
Jones v. United States (1960)	362 U.S. 257	1960
NLRB v. Drivers	362 U.S. 274	1960
FTC v. Travelers Health Ass'n	362 U.S. 293	1960
Tilghman v. Culver	362 U.S. 308	1960
McGann v. United States	362 U.S. 309	1960
Mitchell v. H.B. Zachry Co.	362 U.S. 310	1960
Union Pac. R. Co. v. United States	362 U.S. 327	1960
Rubber Workers v. NLRB	362 U.S. 329	1960
R.R. Telegraphers v. Chi. & Nw. R.R. Co.	362 U.S. 330	1960
Marine Cooks v. Panama S.S. Co.	362 U.S. 365	1960
Miller Music Corp. v. Charles N. Daniels, Inc.	362 U.S. 373	1960
Mackey v. Mendoza-Martinez	362 U.S. 384	1960
Yancy v. United States	362 U.S. 389	1960
Niukkanen v. McAlexander	362 U.S. 390	1960
Ward v. Atl. Coast Line R.R. Co.	362 U.S. 396	1960
Burlington-Chi. Cartage, Inc. v. United States	362 U.S. 401	1960
Bogle v. Jakes Foundry Co.	362 U.S. 401	1960
Dusky v. United States	362 U.S. 402	1960
Izzo v. Illinois	362 U.S. 403	1960
N.H. Fire Ins. Co. v. Scanlon	362 U.S. 404	1960
Machinists v. NLRB	362 U.S. 411	1960
Huron Portland Cement Co. v. City of Detroit	362 U.S. 440	1960
Phillips v. New York	362 U.S. 456	1960
Cerminaro v. Urban Redevelopment Auth.	362 U.S. 457	1960
Clev. Elec. Illuminating Co. v. City of Euclid	362 U.S. 457	1960
Md. & Va. Milk Producers Ass'n, Inc. v. United States	362 U.S. 458	1960
Norstrand v. Little	362 U.S. 474	1960
Communications Workers v. NLRB	362 U.S. 479	1960
United States v. Republic Steel Corp.	362 U.S. 482	1960
Schaffer v. United States	362 U.S. 511	1960
Wyatt v. United States	362 U.S. 525	1960
Mitchell v. Trawler Racer, Inc.	362 U.S. 539	1960
Parker v. Ellis	362 U.S. 574	1960
Needelman v. United States	362 U.S. 600	1960
United States v. Alabama	362 U.S. 602	1960
Teamsters v. Oliver	362 U.S. 605	1960
Wilde v. Wyoming	362 U.S. 607	1960
McMorran v. Tuscarora Nation of Indians	362 U.S. 608	1960
Helm v. Arizona	362 U.S. 609	1960
Levine v. United States	362 U.S. 610	1960
Rohr Aircraft Corp. v. San Diego Cnty.	362 U.S. 628	1960
Williams v. LaVallee	362 U.S. 637	1960
Sims Motor Transp. Lines, Inc. v. United States	362 U.S. 637	1960
