= Talley v. California =

- Supreme Court of the United States

Argued January 13–14, 1960 Decided March 7, 1960
- Full case name: Talley v. California
- Citations: 362 U.S. 60 (more) 80 S. Ct. 536; 4 L. Ed. 2d 559; 1960 U.S. LEXIS 1948
- Argument: Oral argument

Holding
- The distribution of anonymous handbills is protected by the First Amendment.

Court membership
- Chief Justice Earl Warren Associate Justices Hugo Black · Felix Frankfurter; William O. Douglas · Tom C. Clark; John M. Harlan II · William J. Brennan Jr. Charles E. Whittaker · Potter Stewart

Case opinions
- Majority: Black, joined by Warren, Douglas, Harlan, Brennan, Stewart
- Concurrence: Harlan
- Dissent: Clark, joined by Frankfurter, Whittaker

Laws applied
- U.S. Const. amend. I

Talley v. California, 362 U.S. 60 (1960), was a case in which the Supreme Court of the United States voided a Los Angeles city ordinance which forbade the distribution of any handbills in any place under any circumstances if the handbills did not contain the name and address of the person for whom it was prepared, distributed, or sponsored.

Manuel Talley was distributing handbills that promoted the boycott of businesses that refused to hire minorities. The handbills he distributed were anonymous which resulted in the California municipal court to rule that he was violating the ordinance and fined him $10. He appealed to the California appellate court which affirmed his conviction. He appealed again to the supreme court which found the ordinance unconstitutional.

Talley is often cited for the proposition that identification requirements burden speech.

== The Importance of Anonymous Speech ==
Talley v. California is notable for its exposition on anonymous speech. While looking at historical applications of anonymous speech, the court points to two uses in particular that influenced their decision.

1. Fear of Retaliation - Speaking anonymously protects those that criticize oppressive practices from the oppressors.
2. Focus on the Message - Listeners focus on the message rather than the messenger when speech is anonymous.

== Dissent ==
Although the dissent also saw the important protections of anonymous speech, it did not see any danger in this particular instance. The right to speak anonymously had to weigh against the benefit of the public knowing the author. As the dissent saw no evidence that any harm would come to Talley by revelation of his identity, the public knowledge outweighed Talley's right to anonymous speech.

== See also ==
- List of United States Supreme Court cases
  - Lists of United States Supreme Court cases by volume
  - List of United States Supreme Court cases, volume 362
- Anonymous Online Speakers v. United States District Court for the District of Nevada
- McIntyre v. Ohio Elections Commission
