= List of United States Supreme Court cases, volume 361 =

This is a list of all the United States Supreme Court cases from volume 361 of the United States Reports:

Case name	Citation	Date decided
Wabash R.R. Co. v. Comm. Transp., Inc.	361 U.S. 1	1959
Friedberg v. Pa. Labor Relations Bd.	361 U.S. 2	1959
Berkshire Fine Spinning Associates, Inc. v. City of New York	361 U.S. 3	1959
Beard v. Ohio	361 U.S. 4	1959
Womack v. Ohio	361 U.S. 5	1959
Nichols v. McGee	361 U.S. 6	1959
E. States Petroleum Corp. v. Rogers	361 U.S. 7	1959
Castellano v. Comm'n of Investigation	361 U.S. 7	1959
Broady v. New York	361 U.S. 8	1959
Kiser v. Clinchfield Coal Corp.	361 U.S. 8	1959
Firestone Tire & Rubber Co. v. Los Angeles Cnty.	361 U.S. 9	1959
Ryals v. Florida	361 U.S. 9	1959
Mancuso v. Comm'n of Investigation	361 U.S. 10	1959
Birnel v. Fircrest	361 U.S. 10	1959
Jones Motor Co. v. Pa. Pub. Util. Comm'n	361 U.S. 11	1959
Lewey v. Jones	361 U.S. 11	1959
Keleher v. La Salle Coll.	361 U.S. 12	1959
Mo. Pac. R.R. Co. v. Deering	361 U.S. 12	1959
Smith v. United States (1959)	361 U.S. 13	1959
Spivak v. California	361 U.S. 13	1959
McCauley v. Consol. Underwriters	361 U.S. 14	1959
Jordan v. Michigan	361 U.S. 14	1959
Harris v. Pa. R.R. Co.	361 U.S. 15	1959
Conner v. Butler	361 U.S. 29	1959
Kirshbaum v. City of Los Angeles	361 U.S. 30	1959
Memorial Gardens Ass'n, Inc. v. Smith	361 U.S. 31	1959
Magnet Cove Barium Corp. v. United States	361 U.S. 32	1959
Wagner v. Electricians	361 U.S. 33	1959
Ex parte Powell	361 U.S. 34	1959
Seismograph Serv. Corp. v. Monaghan	361 U.S. 35	1959
Quickie Transp.Co. v. United States	361 U.S. 36	1959
Weston v. Sigler	361 U.S. 37	1959
Smith v. United States (1959)	361 U.S. 38	1959
Worbetz v. Goodman	361 U.S. 38	1959
Steelworkers v. United States	361 U.S. 39	1959
United States v. Seaboard Air Line R.R. Co.	361 U.S. 78	1959
St. Johns Motor Express Co. v. United States	361 U.S. 84	1959
Tahiti Bar, Inc. v. Pa. Liquor Control Bd.	361 U.S. 85	1959
Lehigh Casino, Inc. v. Pa. Liquor Control Bd.	361 U.S. 85	1959
Safeway Trails, Inc. v. United States	361 U.S. 86	1959
Glover v. Michigan	361 U.S. 86	1959
Comm'r v. Acker	361 U.S. 87	1959
Tri-City Broadcasting Co. v. Bowers	361 U.S. 97	1959
Henry v. United States	361 U.S. 98	1959
Sentilles v. Inter-Caribbean Shipping Corp.	361 U.S. 107	1959
Schwegmann Bros. Giant Super Markets v. McCrory	361 U.S. 114	1959
J. Aron & Co. v. Miss. Shipping Co.	361 U.S. 115	1959
United States v. Terminal R.R. Ass'n	361 U.S. 116	1959
LaPorte v. New York	361 U.S. 116	1959
Murphy v. Comm'r of Ed.	361 U.S. 117	1959
Breaton v. United States	361 U.S. 117	1959
West v. United States	361 U.S. 118	1959
de Simone v. United States	361 U.S. 125	1959
Fletcher v. Bryan	361 U.S. 126	1959
West Town Bus Co. v. Lau	361 U.S. 127	1959
Matthews v. Handley	361 U.S. 127	1959
MacNeil v. Morton	361 U.S. 128	1959
Vernon v. Bennett	361 U.S. 128	1959
Braen v. Pfeifer Oil Transp. Co.	361 U.S. 129	1959
Inman v. Balt. & Ohio R. Co.	361 U.S. 138	1959
Smith v. California	361 U.S. 147	1959
Minneapolis & St. L.R.R. Co. v. United States	361 U.S. 173	1959
Pub. Serv. Comm'n v. FPC	361 U.S. 195	1959
Faubus v. Aaron	361 U.S. 197	1959
King v. Consol. Underwriters	361 U.S. 198	1959
Blackburn v. Alabama	361 U.S. 199	1960
Stirone v. United States	361 U.S. 212	1960
United States v. Robinson	361 U.S. 220	1960
Mitchell v. Or. Frozen Foods Co.	361 U.S. 231	1960
Stuart v. Wilson	361 U.S. 232	1960
Lewis v. Moore	361 U.S. 232	1960
In re Sarner	361 U.S. 233	1960
In re McDaniel	361 U.S. 233	1960
Kinsella v. United States ex rel. Singleton	361 U.S. 234	1960
Grisham v. Hagan	361 U.S. 278	1960
McElroy v. United States ex rel. Guagliardo	361 U.S. 281	1960
Mitchell v. Robert DeMario Jewelry, Inc.	361 U.S. 288	1960
United States v. Price	361 U.S. 304	1960
Hess v. United States	361 U.S. 314	1960
Goett v. Union Carbide Corp.	361 U.S. 340	1960
State Corp. Comm'n v. Arrow Transp. Co.	361 U.S. 353	1960
Davis v. Virginian R.R. Co.	361 U.S. 354	1960
Oil Workers v. Missouri	361 U.S. 363	1960
Super. Ct. v. Washington ex rel. Yellow Cab Serv., Inc.	361 U.S. 373	1960
Gair v. Peck	361 U.S. 374	1960
Taylor v. Taylor	361 U.S. 374	1960
United States ex rel. Poret v. Sigler	361 U.S. 375	1960
Phillips Chem. Co. v. Dumas Independent Sch. Dist.	361 U.S. 376	1960
Arnold v. Ben Kanowsky, Inc.	361 U.S. 388	1960
NLRB v. Deena Artware, Inc.	361 U.S. 398	1960
Forman v. United States	361 U.S. 416	1960
United States v. Mersky	361 U.S. 431	1960
Lewis v. Benedict Coal Corp.	361 U.S. 459	1960
NLRB v. Ins. Agents	361 U.S. 477	1960
Bates v. City of Little Rock	361 U.S. 516	1960
Petite v. United States	361 U.S. 529	1960
New York ex rel. Valenti v. McCloskey	361 U.S. 534	1960
Nat'l Can Corp. v. State Tax Comm'n	361 U.S. 534	1960
Siebel v. City of New York	361 U.S. 535	1960
Bd. of Ed. v. Allen	361 U.S. 535	1960
Jehovah's Witnesses v. Grosman	361 U.S. 536	1960
Dunitz v. City of Los Angeles	361 U.S. 536	1960
Hughes v. Oklahoma (1960)	361 U.S. 537	1960
McAbee v. United States	361 U.S. 537	1960
Higgins v. State Bar of Cal.	361 U.S. 538	1960
Ryan v. Tinsley	361 U.S. 538	1960
