= Apple v. Does =

California Courts of Appeal case

Apple v. Does (O'Grady v. Superior Court (Apple))
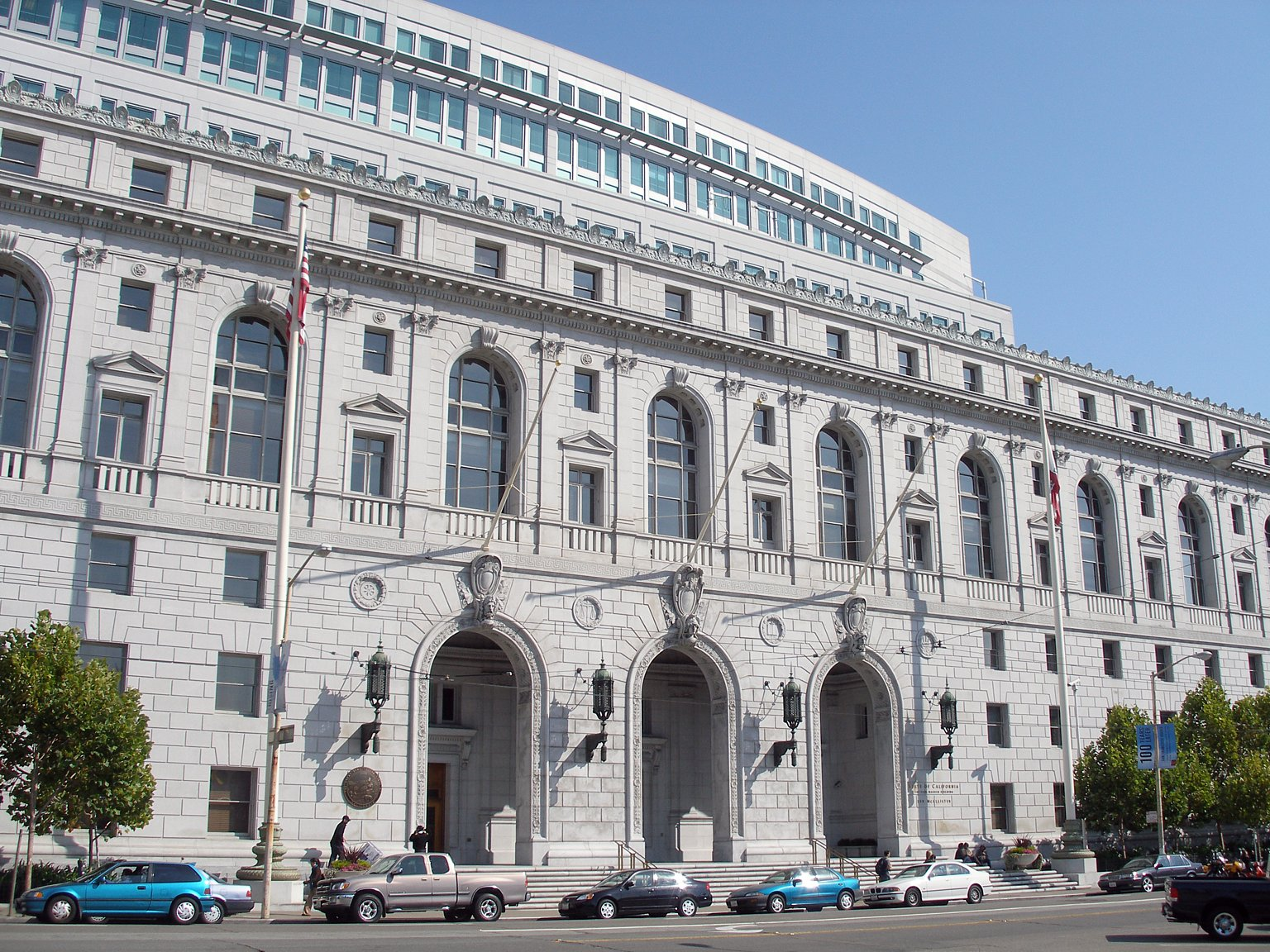
- California Court of Appeal, 6th District
- Court: California Courts of Appeal
- Full case name: O'Grady v. Superior Court (Apple)
- Decided: May 26, 2006
- Citations: O'Grady v. Superior Court, 139 Cal.App. 4th 1423, 44 Cal. Rptr. 3d 72, modified by O'Grady v. Superior Court, 140 Cal.App. 4th 675b, 2006.

Case history
- Appealed from: Santa Clara County Superior Court, case CV032178; Hon. James P. Kleinberg
- Subsequent actions: O'Grady v. Superior Court, 140 Cal.App. 4th 675b, 2006.

Holding
- Trial court reversed; motion for a protective order must be granted

Case opinions
- Decision by: Rushing, P.J.

Keywords
- Intellectual property; Trade secret

Apple v. Does (O'Grady v. Superior Court) was a high-profile legal proceeding in the United States of America notable for bringing into question the breadth of the shield law protecting journalists from being forced to reveal their sources, and whether that law applied to online news journalists writing about corporate trade secrets. The case was also notable for the large collection of amici curiae who joined in the matter.

The case began after several online news journals published articles concerning unreleased Apple products. Apple issued subpoenas seeking the identity of the source who leaked the information, information Apple considered a trade secret. The online news journals then sought judicial orders to protect their sources. The matter was heard by a trial judge who ruled in Apple's favor; that ruling was then appealed by the defendant online journalists.

The appellate court held that trade secrets do not, by themselves, categorically transcend freedom of the press, that there is no relevant legal distinction between journalistic blogging online and traditional print journalism with regard to the shield law, and that Apple's attempt to subpoena the email service provider of one of the journals was a violation of the U.S. federal law known as the Stored Communications Act.

== Case facts ==
Apple Computer filed the case in December 2004 against unnamed individuals, "Does", in Santa Clara County, California, alleging the defendant Does leaked information about new Apple products to several online news sites, including AppleInsider and O'Grady's PowerPage. The published articles at issue concerned a FireWire audio interface for GarageBand software which Apple had code-named Asteroid, or Q7.

Seeking to determine the identities of the sites' information sources, Apple issued subpoenas to AppleInsider's and O'Grady's PowerPage's publishers, the owner of Think Secret, dePlume Organization LLC, as well as Nfox.com, and the email service provider for O'Grady's PowerPage for email messages that would identify the confidential source. Apple maintained in its filings that the information published by the defendants qualified as trade secrets under California statutes including the Uniform Trade Secrets Act (USTA) and the California Penal Code.

The defendants publicly informed Apple they would not comply, and filed demands for protective orders with the court, attempting to block Apple's subpoenas.

== Companion case: Apple Computer v. dePlume ==
Apple also filed a trade secret lawsuit over a separate issue against Think Secret's owner on January 4, 2004. In the Does matter, Apple did not sue specific journalists, but sought information concerning who leaked information on Asteroid. In contrast, Apple's suit against Think Secret accused the dePlume organization of harming Apple's trade secret property interests by publishing stories about a "headless iMac" (the Mac Mini), and about an updated version of iWork. Apple's separate lawsuit against Think Secret, Apple Computer v. Deplume, sought damages directly from dePlume and Think Secret for alleged dissemination of trade secrets through published stories on the Mac mini and iWork, and alleged such publication to be in violation of California law, although Think Secret did no original reporting on Asteroid. On March 4, 2005, the dePlume Organization filed a responsive motion in the same court as the Does case, demanding dismissal of Apple's suit under the California Anti-SLAPP Statute.

== Lower court history ==
On March 11, 2005, the Santa Clara County Superior Court trial judge declined to grant the defendants a protective order prohibiting discovery of their email. The court based its decision on its determination that (1) Apple's property as received by defendants was stolen, (2) that defendants did not convince the court they were journalists who could make legitimate use of the shield privilege, and (3) even if defendants were journalists, Apple's property rights took precedence over journalists' rights to protect their sources.

Specifically, the court reasoned that since the leaked information in the posting made by O'Grady contained an exact copy of a detailed drawing of "Asteroid" created by Apple, and included technical specifications that were copied verbatim from the same source, and all of that information was taken from a confidential set of slides labeled 'Apple Need-to-Know Confidential", that the information was "stolen property, just as any physical item." The court discussed the notion that websites posting such stolen information were analogous to criminal fences. The court determined the claim of "privilege" was thus overstated because reporters and their sources do not have a license to violate criminal laws. The court wrote that defendants claimed they were journalists because they sought the protection of the privilege against revealing their sources of information, rather than finding they sought the protection of privilege because they were journalists.

The court noted that Apple's legal argument passed the five-part test articulated in the California case Mitchell v. Superior Court which weighed whether a subpoena should be permitted over journalists' privilege rights under the First Amendment. The court reasoned that because there was no pending motion for injunctive relief against anyone, the issue of prior restraint was not before the Court, and cited as helpful the California Supreme Court's analysis in DVD Copy Control Ass'n, Inc. v. Bunner, which observed "[T]he First Amendment does not prohibit courts from incidentally enjoining speech in order to protect a legitimate property right."

== Appellate history ==
On June 2, 2005, the California Court of Appeals for the 6th District issued an Order to Show Cause, directing Apple to show the Court "why a peremptory writ should not issue as requested in the petition" filed by the online journalists, and held a hearing with oral argument on April 20, 2006.

=== Decision ===
On May 26, 2006, the Court of Appeal issued its ruling in favor of the online journalists, holding that the trial court's denial of the defendants' motion for a protective order was in error because

(1) the subpoena to the email service provider could not be enforced consistent with the plain terms of the federal Stored Communications Act (18 U.S.C. §§ 2701-2712);
(2) any subpoenas seeking unpublished information from defendants (appellate petitioners) would be unenforceable through contempt proceedings in light of the California reporter's shield (Cal. Const., art. I, § 2, subd (b); Evid. Code, § 1070); and
(3) discovery of the defendants' sources was also barred on the specific facts of the case by the conditional constitutional privilege against compulsory disclosure of confidential sources in keeping with prior precedent in Mitchell.

The court took the time to chastise Apple's secret-protection tactics by remarking:

... the discovery process is intended as a device to facilitate adjudication, not as an end in itself. To accept Apple's position on the present point would empower betrayed employers to clothe themselves with the subpoena power merely by suing fictitious defendants, and then to use that power solely to identify treacherous employees for purposes of discipline, all without any intent of pursuing the underlying case to judgment. An employer pursuing such an objective might prefer not to join any defendants lest it expose itself to negative consequences up to and including a countersuit for malicious prosecution or abuse of process. Our sympathy for employers in such a position cannot blind us to the gross impropriety of using the courts and their powers of compulsory process as a tool and adjunct of an employer's personnel department.

== Amici curiae ==
When the online news sites filed their appeal of the trial court's decision on March 22, 2005, they were joined by many amici supporting the journalists' petition:

- the San Jose Mercury News
- the Hearst Corporation (San Francisco Chronicle)
- The McClatchy Company (The Sacramento Bee)
- the Los Angeles Times
- the Copley Press (San Diego Union-Tribune)
- Freedom Communications (The Orange County Register)
- the Associated Press
- the Reporters Committee for Freedom of the Press
- the California Newspaper Publishers Association
- the First Amendment Coalition
- the Society of Professional Journalists
- the Student Press Law Center
- the American Civil Liberties Union
- The Center for Individual Freedom
- The First Amendment Project, a nonprofit law firm
- Reporters Without Borders
- the Media Bloggers Association
- Four law professors
- numerous online journalists
- NetCoalition
- the United States Internet Industry Association.

Amici supporting Apple include:

- Genentech
- Intel
- the Business Software Alliance

== Backlash ==
Because the matter involved popular websites and freedom of the press issues as well as a high-profile technology company, it was highly publicized. Critics accused Apple of using the lawsuit not only to protect its trade secrets, but to frighten its employees in order to prevent future leaking. Critics of the trial court's ruling expressed concern the ruling reduced U.S. journalists' protections under the First Amendment to the United States Constitution and would have a chilling effect on what can be published. Before the decision was rendered, The Register noted "If successful, the free press would be restricted to regurgitating Apple press releases and spoonfed non disclosure agreements." Many bloggers criticized Apple's suit; some of their followers thought Apple might face a blogger-initiated boycott. The Personal Technology editor of the San Jose Mercury News wrote an open letter to Steve Jobs warning that "The lawsuits pose an imminent threat to Apple's most precious asset: the company's reputation as a hip underdog, a cool alternative to bigger and blander competitors such as Microsoft, Dell and Hewlett-Packard."

== See also ==
- Apple Inc. litigation
- Hard Drive Productions, Inc. v. Does 1-1,495
