= Brown v. Socialist Workers '74 Campaign Committee =

- Supreme Court of the United States

Argued October 4, 1982 Decided December 8, 1982
- Full case name: Brown, et al. v. Socialist Workers '74 Campaign Committee (Ohio), et al.
- Docket no.: 81-776
- Citations: 459 U.S. 87 (more) 103 S. Ct. 416; 74 L. Ed. 2d 250; 1982 U.S. LEXIS 169
- Argument: Oral argument
- Opinion announcement: Opinion announcement

Case history
- Prior: Appeal from the United States District Court for the Southern District of Ohio

Holding
- States cannot require a minor political party to disclose its membership or associates, when doing so would jeopardize the safety of those persons.

Court membership
- Chief Justice Warren E. Burger Associate Justices William J. Brennan Jr. · Byron White; Thurgood Marshall · Harry Blackmun; Lewis F. Powell Jr. · William Rehnquist; John P. Stevens · Sandra Day O'Connor

Case opinions
- Majority: Marshall, joined by Burger, Brennan, White, Blackmun (parts I, III, IV), Powell
- Concurrence: Blackmun
- Concur/dissent: O'Connor, joined by Rehnquist, Stevens

Laws applied
- U.S. Const. amend. I

Brown v. Socialist Workers '74 Campaign Committee, 459 U.S. 87 (1982), was a United States Supreme Court case that dealt with political speech, and whether a state could require a minor political party to disclose its membership, expenditures, and contributors.

At the time, most states required political parties to disclose their contributions and expenditures; in 1982, the Court ruled that the Socialist Workers Party, a minor party in Ohio, was not required to disclose its contributors or recipients, on the basis of retributive animus and harassment if party functionaries did so.
