= Doe v. Cahill =

2005 Supreme Court of Delaware judgement

- Court: Supreme Court of Delaware
- Decided: October 5, 2005
- Citation: 884 A.2d 451

Court membership
- Judges sitting: Myron Steele, Randy J. Holland, Carolyn Berger, Jack B. Jacobs, Henry M. Ridgely

Case opinions
- Judgement of the Superior Court's decision was reversed.
- Decision by: Steele

Doe v. Cahill, 884 A.2d 451 (Del. 2005), is a significant case in the realm of anonymous internet speech and the First Amendment. While similar issues had been tackled involving criticism of a publicly traded company, the case marks the first time the Delaware Supreme Court addressed the issue of anonymous internet speech and defamation "in the context of a case involving political criticism of a public figure."

== Background ==
In 2004, an anonymous internet user, referred to in the decision as Doe, posted comments under the alias "Proud Citizen" on a website called the "Smyrna/Clayton Issues Blog" regarding the performance of Patrick and Julia Cahill as City Councilman of Smyrna. The website was sponsored by the Delaware State News. The guidelines for use of the blog simply stated "[t]his is your hometown forum for opinions about public issues."

On September 18, 2004, Doe posted the following statement:

If only Councilman Cahill was able to display the same leadership skills,
energy and enthusiasm toward the revitalization and growth of
the fine town of Smyrna as Mayor Schaeffer has demonstrated! While
Mayor Schaeffer has made great strides toward improving the
livelihood of Smyrna’s citizens, Cahill has devoted all of his energy to
being a divisive impediment to any kind of cooperative movement.
Anyone who has spent any amount of time with Cahill would be keenly
aware of such character flaws, not to mention an obvious mental
deterioration. Cahill is a prime example of failed leadership – his
eventual ousting is exactly what Smyrna needs in order to move
forward and establish a community that is able to thrive on its own
economic stability and common pride in its town.

On September 19, 2004 Doe added:

Gahill [sic] is as paranoid as everyone in the town thinks he is. The
mayor needs support from his citizens and protections from
unfounded attacks…

It was these two internet postings that formed the basis for the legal action discussed below.

== Legal timeline ==
The legal actions that led to the Delaware Supreme Court case proceeded as follows:

- November 2, 2004: The Cahills file suit against Doe (and 3 other anonymous internet posters) claiming defamation and invasion of privacy.
- The Cahills conduct a pre-service deposition of Independent Newspapers (which owned the internet blog) and obtained the IP addresses associated with Doe's postings.
- The Cahills learn that these IP addresses are owned by the Comcast Corporation and obtain a court order requiring Comcast to disclose Doe's identity.
- Comcast notifies Doe of the Cahills' request to disclose identity, as required by federal law.
- January 4, 2005: Doe files an "Emergency Motion for a Protective Order" to block Comcast from disclosing his identity to the Cahills.
- June 14, 2005: Superior Court trial judge denies Doe's motion for a protective order, using a "good faith" standard for "determining when a defamation plaintiff could compel the disclosure of the identity of an anonymous plaintiff."
- June 28, 2005: Doe appeals the decision by Superior Court and the case is accepted by the Delaware Supreme Court.

== Adoption of standard ==
As this was the first trial of its kind, the court took upon itself the task of establishing an acceptable standard for deciding a discovery request to reveal the identity of an anonymous defendant alleged to have posted defamatory material on the internet by a public figure plaintiff. The court began by reviewing the possible spectrum of applicable standards over which the court must choose as the standard for this and similar cases. In ascending order the possible standards are "good faith basis to assert a claim, ...pleading sufficient facts to survive a motion to dismiss, [and] ...showing of prima facie evidence sufficient to withstand a motion for summary judgement."

The Superior Court permitted discovery of Doe's identity under the good faith standard. This good faith standard was famously applied in In re Subpoena to AOL, where the court concluded that anonymous identities should be revealed only if:

1. The court is satisfied with pleadings and evidence
2. The party bringing suit or subpoena had legitimate, good faith basis for actions
3. The identity information is central to the claim

The Delaware Supreme Court disagreed with this standard. The court rejected the good faith standard due to the danger of bringing suit simply to reveal identity without any intention of pursuing the defamation action to a final decision. This, the court concluded, would have a chilling effect on free speech on the internet in contradiction to the First Amendment.

The Supreme Court then turned to Ramunno v. Cawley as an example of the motion to dismiss standard being applied to a similar case. The court used Ramunno as an example of a motion to dismiss standard failing to screen "silly or trivial defamation suits."

Thus, the court concluded, that in order to provide sufficient protection of anonymous internet speech and the First Amendment, a summary judgement standard is necessary. The court chose to base its summary judgement standard off of the precedent set by Dendrite International, Inc. v. Doe No. 3. In Dendrite, the court held that a summary judgement standard "is the appropriate test by which to strike the balance between a defamation plaintiff’s right to protect his reputation and a defendant’s right to exercise free speech anonymously." The Dendrite test developed in this decision has four prongs as described in Doe v. Cahill :

(1) to undertake efforts to notify the anonymous poster that he is the subject of a subpoena or application for an order of disclosure, and to withhold action to afford the anonymous defendant a reasonable opportunity to file and serve opposition to the application. In the internet context, the plaintiff’s efforts should include posting a message of notification of the discovery request to the anonymous defendant on the same message board as the original allegedly defamatory posting;

(2) to set forth the exact statements purportedly made by the anonymous poster that the plaintiff alleges constitute defamatory speech; and

(3) to satisfy the prima facie or “summary judgment standard.”

Finally, after the trial court concluded that the plaintiff has presented a prima facie cause of action, the Dendrite test requires the trial court to: (4) balance the defendant’s First Amendment right of anonymous free speech against the strength of the prima facie case presented and the necessity for the disclosure of the anonymous defendant’s identity in determining whether to allow the plaintiff to properly proceed.

In this case, the court holds that only the first and third prongs of the Dendrite test are relevant, and thus adopts a summary judgement standard based on these two prongs.

== Decision ==
Applying the summary judgement standard described above, the judgement of the superior court was reversed, the case was remanded back to the superior court with instructions to dismiss the plaintiff's claim with prejudice. Therefore, Doe was permitted to remain anonymous.

== Aftermath of the precedent ==
Doe v. Cahill represented another victory for the protection of free anonymous speech on the internet. The precedent was notably applied in Mobilisa, Inc. v. Doe in 2007 and still serves as the standard for anonymous internet speech and defamation "in the context of a case involving political criticism of a public figure."

== See also ==
- Anonymous Online Speakers v. United States District Court for the District of Nevada
