= Mobilisa, Inc. v. Doe =

Lawsuit

- Court: Arizona Court of Appeals
- Full case name: Mobilisa, Inc., a Washington corporation, Plaintiff/Appellee, v. John Doe 1 and The Suggestion Box, Inc., Defendants/Appellants.
- Decided: November 27, 2007
- Citation: 170 P.3d 712

Court membership
- Judges sitting: Susan A. Ehrlich, Ann Timmer, Daniel Barker

Case opinions
- Majority: Timmer, joined by Ehrlich
- Dissent: Barker

Keywords
- Anonymity; Freedom of speech; Internet privacy; Right to privacy

Mobilisa v. Doe was a lawsuit filed in 2005 by Mobilisa Inc., a Washington-based company that provides wireless and mobile communications to government and military clients. The case against John Doe, the anonymous sender of an email using the service "The Suggestion Box". The case is notable regarding the legal question of what standard should govern requests for discovery of the identity of an anonymous Internet speaker whose speech allegedly violated a plaintiff's rights. While the court originally issued a subpoena requiring The Suggestion Box to disclose the identity of the e-mail's sender, it later vacated this order when The Suggestion Box objected in December 2005.

== Background ==
The dispute originated with an email originally sent from a company e-mail account by Nelson Ludlow, the founder and chief executive of Mobilisa Inc., to a woman who was not employed by Mobilisa but was involved in a personal relationship with Ludlow. This e-mail was forwarded six days later to members of Mobilisa's management team from an anonymous sender with an address hosted at "theanonymousemail.com", a domain managed by The Suggestion Box, Inc. The e-mail contained Ludlow's original e-mail to the woman and subject line was the question "Is this a company you want to work for?".

== Initial discovery order ==
Mobilisa requested that the Arizona Superior Court issue a subpoena compelling The Suggestion Box to disclose the identity of the anonymous sender in August 2005 on the basis that the sender had violated two federal statues that make it illegal to "hack" electronic communications. This request was initially granted by the court.

In December 2005, the discovery order was vacated when The Suggestion Box objected by counsel. Charles Lee Mudd Jr. (Mudd Law Offices) and local counsel W. Dennis Gorman represented The Suggestion Box in the Superior Court and through the subsequent appeal. The court adopted the standard set out in Doe v. Cahill, 884 A.2d 451 to make this determination. Under this standard, an anonymous Internet speaker's identity should be divulged "(1)if the requesting party makes reasonable efforts to notify the anonymous speaker of the discovery request and that person is afforded a reasonable time to respond, and (2) the requesting party demonstrates its cause of action would survive a motion for summary judgment." While the court found that Mobilisa had not fully satisfied the Cahill standard, it provided the parties the opportunity to file supplemental memoranda. Additionally, the court ordered that The Suggestion Box must notify the applicable account holder(s) of the subpoena request.

== Subsequent procedures ==
On February 23, 2006, the counsel for Suggestion Box filed an affidavit stating that, with The Suggestion Box's consent, they would now also be representing the Doe in this matter. Doe, through counsel, objected to the subpoena request and stated that they did not access or obtain the email in question through Mobilisa's computer system.

On February 27 the superior court found that Mobilisa had sufficiently amended its request such that it now met the standard set forth by Cahill, and as such granted Mobilisa leave to conduct discovery regarding Doe's identity.

== Court of Appeals ==
This decision was appealed by The Suggestion Box and Doe arguing that while the superior court correctly adopted the Cahill standard, it was misapplied in this case. On the other hand, Mobilisa argued that the superior court applied the wrong standard but reached the correct conclusion. Public Citizen, whose amicus brief in the case of Dendrite International, Inc. v. Doe No. 3 had led to the adoption of the balancing test in that case, appeared as amicus curiae urging adoption of the Dendrite approach. In the end, the appellate court adopted a synthesized version of the standard set forth in Dendrite. Under this standard, the court must consider not only the "summary judgment" aspect from the Cahill standard, but also "balance the parties’ competing interests is necessary to achieve appropriate rulings in the vast array of factually distinct cases likely to involve anonymous speech." The case was subsequently remanded to district court for consideration of the third point of the standard.

== Conclusion ==
On February 13, 2008, Mobilisa moved to withdraw its subpoena and dismiss the action.
