= Dendrite International, Inc. v. Doe No. 3 =

New Jersey Superior Court case

- Court: New Jersey Superior Court
- Full case name: Dendrite International, Inc. v. John Doe No. 3
- Argued: May 22, 2001
- Decided: July 11, 2001
- Citations: 342 N.J. Super. 134, 775 A.2d 756 (App. Div. 2001)

Case history
- Prior history: On appeal from Superior Court of New Jersey, Chancery Division, Morris County, Docket No. MRS-C-129-00.

Holding
- Affirmed the Chancery Division's decision that Dendrite's prima facie case did not merit the unmasking of Doe No. 3.

Court membership
- Judges sitting: Stern, Rodríguez and Fall

Case opinions
- Majority: Fall

Dendrite International, Inc. v. Doe No. 3, 342 N.J. Super. 134, 775 A.2d 756 (App. Div. 2001), is a New Jersey Superior Court case in which Dendrite International, Inc., a purveyor of computer software used in the pharmaceutical industry, brought a John Doe lawsuit against individuals who had anonymously posted criticisms of the company on a Yahoo message board. When Presiding Chancery Judge Kenneth MacKenzie rejected one of Dendrite's requests to compel Yahoo to reveal the identity of an anonymous defendant, Dendrite appealed. The appellate court upheld the district court's decision, and in doing so, created a set of guidelines for determining the circumstances under which an anonymous online speaker may be unmasked. This standard has since been applied to other cases, such as Mobilisa, Inc. v. Doe, Gallucci v. New Jersey On-Line LLC, Independent Newspapers v. Brodie, and The Mortgage Specialists, Inc. v. Implode-Explode Heavy Industries, Inc.

== Background ==
No uniform standard exists in the United States for determining the circumstances under which an anonymous online speaker may be unmasked.

The original Superior Court case, Dendrite International, Inc. v. Does, was a lawsuit brought by Dendrite International, Inc. (since acquired by Cegedim), a company that provided pharmaceutical-industry-specific customer relationship management software, against fourteen anonymous defendants. These individuals had posted messages on a Yahoo message board which Dendrite claimed were breaches of contract, were defamatory and contained trade secrets.

The plaintiffs requested that the court reveal the identity of four of the Does. However, unlike judges in previous similar cases, the trial judge ordered that a notice be posted on the message board alerting the Does that Dendrite was subpoenaing Yahoo, enabling some of the Does to contest the action. In November 2000, the trial judge granted the company's motion to conduct limited discovery to ascertain the identities of Does No. 1 and 2, but denied access to Does 3 and 4.

Doe No. 3's comments were related to alleged changes in the company's accounting practices and discussed the CEO's unsuccessful attempts to sell the company. The trial judge felt that Dendrite had failed to prove that it was harmed by the allegations, and found that the conduct of Does No. 3 and 4 did not warrant the revocation of their constitutional protections. Dendrite appealed the decision with respect to Doe No. 3.

== Opinion ==
The appellate court affirmed the Morris County court's opinion, finding that Dendrite's prima facie case did not merit the unmasking of Doe No. 3. The panel cited cases ruling that constitutional free speech protections extend to anonymous or pseudonymous comments made online, and stated that in order for Doe No. 3 to forfeit those protections, Dendrite had to demonstrate that the statements were defamatory in that they were both false and harmful. The court felt that Dendrite had not met these criteria. In measuring harm, the appellate court affirmed the trial court's use of the price of company shares on the stock market in the time period following the posting of the comments.

In making a decision with regards to Doe No. 3, the court set forth a five-prong test for judges to apply in future cases when deciding whether to compel disclosure of an anonymous poster's identity: (1) the plaintiff must make good faith efforts to notify the poster and give the poster a reasonable opportunity to respond; (2) the plaintiff must specifically identify the poster's allegedly actionable statements; (3) the complaint must set forth a prima facie cause of action; (4) the plaintiff must support each element of the claim with sufficient evidence; and (5) "the court must balance the defendant's First Amendment right of anonymous free speech against the strength of the prima facie case presented and the necessity for the disclosure of the anonymous defendant's identity." Dendrite's claim was rejected because it failed to produce adequate evidence of the harm element of the defamation claim as required by the fourth prong of the test. The five prongs had been offered by an amicus brief by Paul Alan Levy from Public Citizen, the American Civil Liberties Union, and the ACLU of New Jersey.

These guidelines build upon the summary judgment standard, but provide additional protection in that they allow the court to "balance" the defendant's rights against the strength of the plaintiff's prima facie case. The standard set by this case has been applied to several others, some in states other than New Jersey, including Indiana.

== See also ==
- Doe v. 2themart.com Inc.
- Cable TV Privacy Act
- Electronic Communications Privacy Act
- Strategic lawsuit against public participation
