= Tabeo =

Discontinued tablet made by Toys "R" Us

The Tabeo is a discontinued tablet computer developed by Toys "R" Us that runs on a version of the Android 4.0 operating system. Tabeo is officially at "End of Life" status, meaning the company is no longer providing support for the original Tabeo and Tabeo E2. Though some of the E2 devices seem to have been sold in Mexico, this seems to have happened to devices that were returned to the reseller. Tabeo is no longer fulfilling warranty repair or replacements, as the company has not produced a new device in 3 years. The company is also no longer providing assistance with any issues that may arise with the device, as the device is considerably Out of Warranty. All support has been discontinued.

It was specifically designed with children in mind, allows parents to implement parental controls, and has 50 apps pre-installed. More than 6000 other apps, all considered to be safe for children, are available on the Tabeo App Store. It has a 7-inch screen and 4 gigabytes of built-in storage space, but is capable of supporting SDHC cards with up to 32 gigabytes of space. It was released on October 21, 2012.

== Lawsuit ==
Fuhu Inc., producer of the Nabi tablet for children, sued Toys "R" Us before the Tabeo was released, claiming that the company had stolen its trade secrets, breached its contract, and committed fraud; and accusing the company of unfair competition. In October 2011, Toys "R" Us had made a deal with Fuhu for exclusive rights to distribute the Nabi tablet. However, Toys "R" Us barely advertised the device and did not order many units, eventually ending the deal in January 2012. Fuhu claimed that it did not know why Toys "R" Us did this until the Tabeo was announced. The lawsuit aimed to prevent the release of the Tabeo, and asked for any Tabeos that had been produced to be turned over to Fuhu, along with additional monetary damages.
