= Fuhu =

American company

- Type: Private
- Industry: Consumer products and services
- Founded: 2008
- Founders: Robb Fujioka; John Hui; Steve Hui
- Defunct: January 19, 2016
- Fate: Filed for bankruptcy; assets sold to Mattel and product line subsequently discontinued
- Headquarters: El Segundo, California, United States
- Key people: Jim Mitchell (CEO)
- Products: Nabi; Nabi 2; Nabi, Jr.; Nabi Dreamtab; Nabi Big Tab
- Revenue: $70 million (2014)
- Parent: Mattel

Fuhu was a company that made the Nabi series of tablet computers. The company filed for bankruptcy, eventually leading to the company's closure on January 9, 2016. Mattel later acquired and continued the brand with the Nabi SE for a few years until the Nabi line was quietly discontinued in 2019.

== History ==
Fuhu was founded in 2008 by Robb Fujioka and brothers John Hui and Steve Hui. The company name was formed by taking the first two letters of the co-founders' last names. John Hui previously co-founded computer manufacturer eMachines, and his friends in the hardware business supplied the $1.5 million in seed money for Fuhu's startup.

John Hui advised Fujioka to stay away from hardware development, which had notoriously small profit margins, and only develop software to be licensed to run on other manufacturers' hardware. The company's early products included digital trading cards called urFooz, a software called urDrive that allowed devices to run applications directly from a USB drive, and Fooz Kids, a mobile device platform designed to give children ages 3 to 10 access to approximately 33,000 kid-friendly areas of the Internet while employing parental controls that prevent them from accessing more adult-oriented sites and services. The platform was praised by child safety advocates and "mommy bloggers".

=== Introduction of the Nabi ===
In mid-2011, Foxconn, a major licensee for Fuhu software, asked Fujioka for ideas to unload a surplus of Foxconn's low-end tablets. Fujioka and Fuhu CEO Jim Mitchell experimented with loading the Fooz Kids platform on the tablets, but the setup proved too unstable to be marketable. Enamored of the concept, however, Fujioka and Mitchell ignored Hui's advice and purchased a higher quality, generic tablet on which they loaded the Fooz Kids platform as a prototype. They added a rubber bumper around the edges of the tablet to protect it from shock damage, which gave the device a butterfly-like appearance. They called the device "Nabi", the Korean word for "butterfly".

In anticipation of the upcoming holiday shopping season, Fuhu struck a deal with Toys "R" Us to be the exclusive distributor of the Nabi. The toy retailer placed an order for 10,000 units of the Nabi, which were delivered a week before Christmas and sold out in two weeks. After Toys "R" Us followed up with an order for only 15,000 units, decided to end the partnership in January 2012, by stopping production on the Nabi. Taking out a $10 million loan to continue operations, the company began designing the Nabi 2 for a launch ahead of the 2012 holiday season. Distributing through Walmart, Best Buy, and Target, Fuhu sold 750,000 units of the Nabi 2. The success of the Nabi 2 brought the company's sales to $117.9 million in 2012.

In September 2012, Fuhu filed suit against Toys "R" Us, claiming breach of contract, fraud, unfair competition and stealing trade secrets after the toy retailer launched a competing tablet, the Tabeo, the next year. Fuhu said Toys "R" Us did "virtually no marketing" of the Nabi during the 2011 holiday shopping season and copied features such as the rubber bumper from the Nabi.

=== Rapid growth ===
In 2013, Fuhu sold over 2 million units, earning the company the top spot on Inc. magazine's list of the 5,000 fastest-growing companies in the United States. The company began hiring additional staff in its finance department, fueling rumors that it was considering an initial public offering. Based on the company's 2013 revenue of $196 million, experts estimated that the public valuation for Fuhu could exceed $1 billion.

Forbes ranked Fuhu at the top of its list of America's Most Promising Companies in January 2014. The company entered a sponsorship agreement with NASCAR driver Landon Cassill for the 2014 Daytona 500. In mid-2014, Fuhu repeated at the top of Inc.'s list of 500 fastest-growing privately held companies, which topped the list consecutively in 1989 and 1990.

=== Decline and bankruptcy ===
Demand for the Nabi line of tablets slowed in 2014 and 2015 as Apple, Samsung, and Amazon expanded their tablet lineups with more kid-friendly options and Comcast-owned children's television network Sprout (now renamed Universal Kids) entered the market with its own tablet. In 2014, Fuhu attempted to jump-start sales with the introduction of the Nabi Dream Tab, ordering 150,000 units, but the device was a commercial failure, leaving Fuhu with a glut of inventory and large debt to manufacturer Foxconn. A class action lawsuit was also filed against the company due to reports of batteries in its Nabi 2 tablets overheating and sometimes catching fire.

In an attempt to mitigate the effects of these difficulties, Fuhu launched a subscription service that allowed users to receive new, exclusive content on a Nabi device and choose to return or upgrade the device at the expiration of the subscription. The company also launched the Nabi Big Tab, a large-screen tablet Fuhu executives said was meant to facilitate a shared, family experience around tablet content such as interactive stories or streaming video. Fuhu did not market test the Big Tab, which reviewed poorly. Among other issues, the battery lasted less than an hour between charges. Many retailers refused to carry it, and through the 2014 holiday shopping season, Fuhu sold only 4,000 units, mostly through its web site.

In November 2015, Bloomberg reported that Fuhu had cancelled Nabi shipments to Walmart, Target, Toys "R" Us, and Best Buy amid a financial dispute with its hardware supplier, Foxconn. Inc. later reported that Fuhu owed Foxconn between $60 million and $100 million, and the supplier had refused to ship any more tablets until payment was made. The company filed for Chapter 11 bankruptcy on December 7, 2015, saying one of its lenders, Tennenbaum Capital Partners, had collected a debt of $6.5 million, leaving Fuhu with insufficient capital to continue operations. Toy maker Mattel tendered a stalking horse offer of $9.5 million for the company and eventually bought it at auction for $21.5 million.

== Products ==
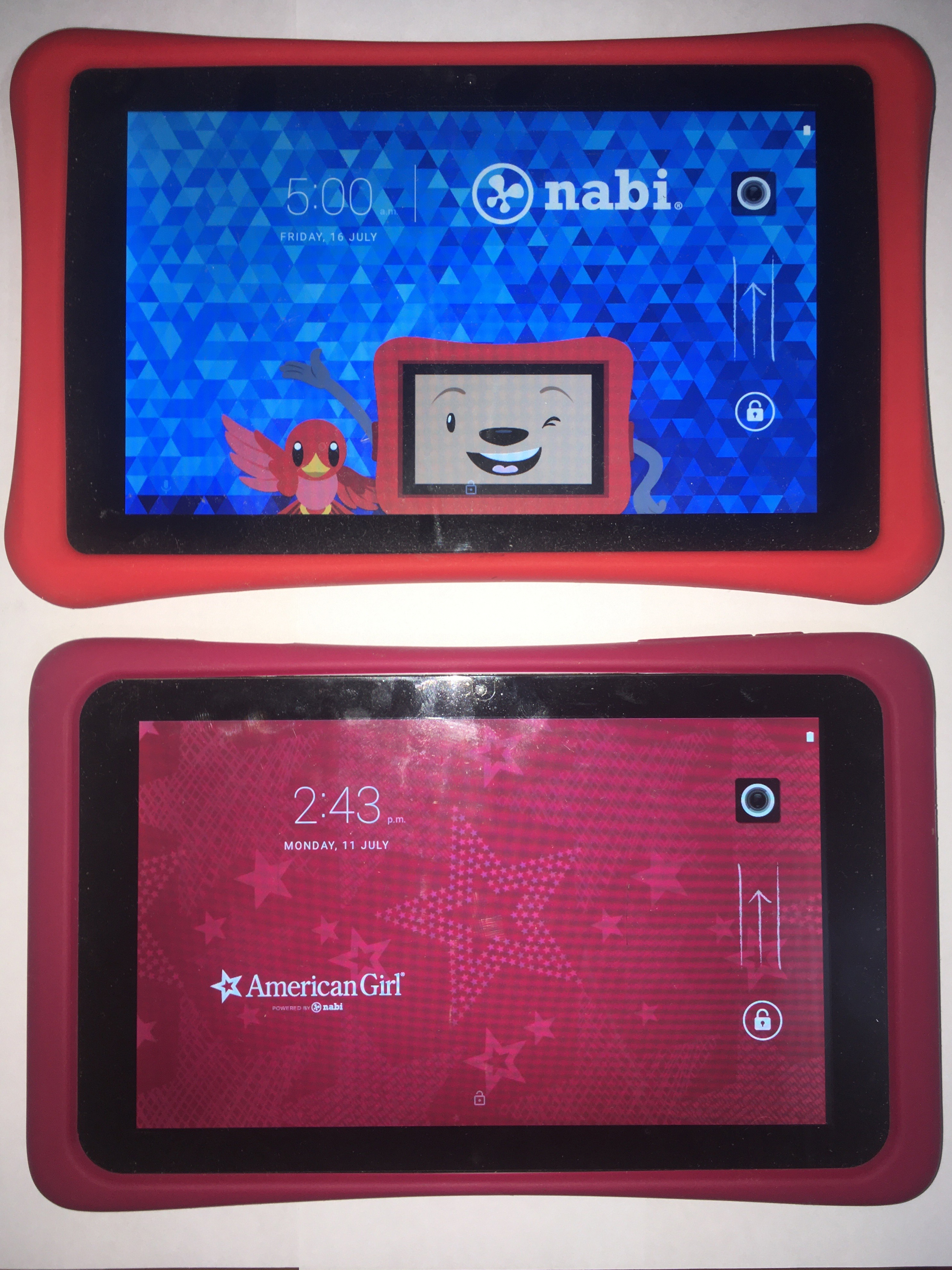
The Nabi SE tablet alongside its American Girl-themed variant. Both devices run on identical hardware and vary only in packaging and bundled software.

Devices from the Nabi line ran on Google's Android operating system overlaid with Fuhu's proprietary software designed specifically for children. An unrestricted parents mode can be accessed through a passcode.

The Nabi 2, launched in 2012, featured 8 GB of internal storage, an Nvidia Tegra system-on-chip, and a 7-inch (18 cm) touch screen and weighed 1.3 pounds (0.59 kg). It also segmented its Nabi line by releasing the 5-inch (13 cm) Nabi Jr. that was aimed at preschool-age children and the 10-inch (25 cm) Nabi XD that was aimed at pre-teens and early teenagers that year. In October, Fuhu launched Disney and Nickelodeon-themed Nabi devices.

At the 2014 Consumer Electronics Show, Fuhu showcased the third generation of its Nabi product, the Nabi Dream Tab. The product was developed in conjunction with DreamWorks Animation and included content featuring popular DreamWorks characters, along with Angry Birds and Cartoon Network. DreamWorks pushed out regular content updates, including exclusive content, for the device, which was also capable of receiving content from Disney, Nickelodeon, and Cartoon Network. Fuhu said the Dream Tab had comparable computing power to the iPad.

In late 2014, Fuhu announced the Nabi Big Tab, available with a 20-inch (51 cm) or 24-inch (61 cm) screen. A special enclosure was designed to facilitate transportation of the large devices – which weighed a minimum of 10.5 pounds (4.8 kg) – from room to room.

In 2016, Mattel launched the Nabi SE, the first and only tablet in the Nabi lineup to be released after Mattel's acquisition of Fuhu. The SE runs on a MediaTek MT8127 system-on-chip and comes with a 7-inch (18 cm) capacitive touch screen and 16GB of internal storage, expandable with a microSD card. In addition to the base SE model, branded variants of the SE based on Mattel properties such as American Girl, Barbie and Hot Wheels were also released, alongside a separate Fisher-Price edition for preschoolers.

=== Accessories ===
With profit margins as low as $5 per unit, Fuhu relied on accessories for the Nabi to increase its profits. Each Nabi tablet featured a small grid on the reverse that could hold rubberized block letters called KINABI, allowing children to customize their devices with short words or names. Fuhu also created Nabi Frames, stickers that surrounded the tablet screen, featuring characters from popular children's television shows. Other accessories included cases, backpacks, screen protectors, car chargers with cords long enough to reach the back seat of a vehicle, and cameras.

In December 2012, Fuhu launched a line of headphones for kids. Dubbed Nabi Notes, the headphones were designed to work with the Nabi tablet line to limit the headphones' volume to 80 dB or less to prevent damage to children's hearing. In 2014, the company added the Nabi Karaoke and a wireless printer to its lineup of accessories for the Nabi.

== Philanthropy ==
Fuhu created a charity, Nabi Inspire, meant to raise awareness and provide support for families affected by autism spectrum disorder through the initiative Gifted 10K.
