= Bradbury, California =

City in California, United States

- City
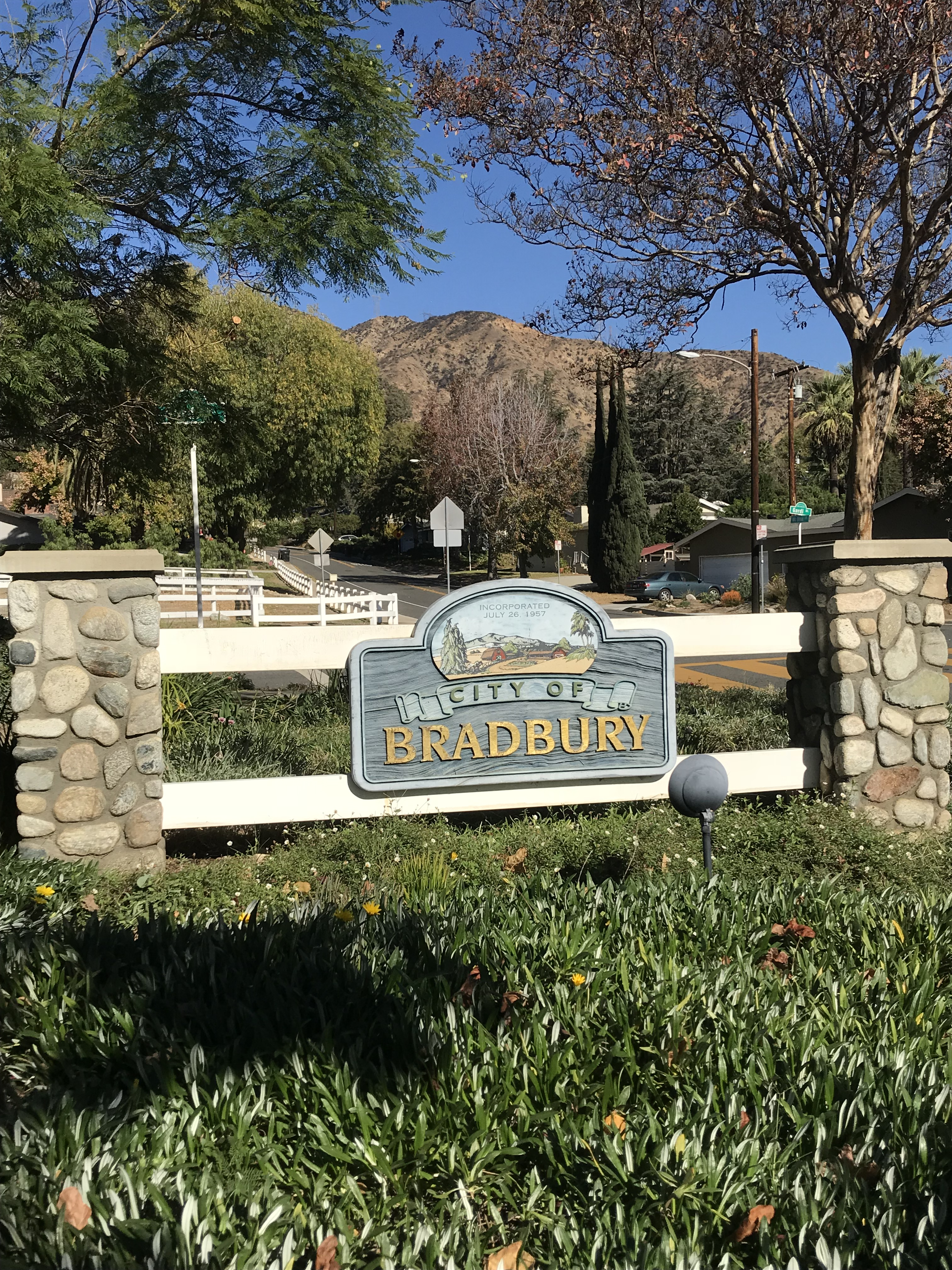
- A Bradbury entrance sign on Mt. Olive Drive

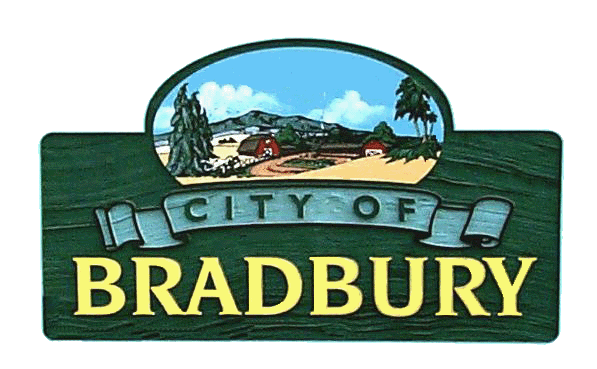
- Seal
- Motto: Preserving Rural Tranquility
- Interactive map of Bradbury, California
- Location in the United States
- Coordinates: 34°8′58″N 117°58′28″W
- Country: United States
- State: California
- County: Los Angeles
- Incorporated: July 26, 1957

Government
  - Type: Council-Manager
  - Mayor: Richard T. Hale, Jr.
  - Mayor Pro Tem: Elizabeth Bruny
  - City Council: Melodie Szymkowski; Richard G. Barakat; Bruce Lathrop
  - City Manager: Kevin Kearney

Area
  - Total: 1.97 sq mi (5.09 km^{2})
  - Land: 1.96 sq mi (5.08 km^{2})
  - Water: 0 sq mi (0.00 km^{2}) 0.06%
- Elevation: 676 ft (206 m)

Population (2020)
  - Total: 921
  - Density: 469.2/sq mi (181.14/km^{2})
- Time zone: UTC-8 (PST)
  - Summer (DST): UTC-7 (PDT)
- ZIP Code: 91008
- Area code: 626
- FIPS code: 06-07946
- GNIS feature ID: 1660369
- Website: bradburyca.gov

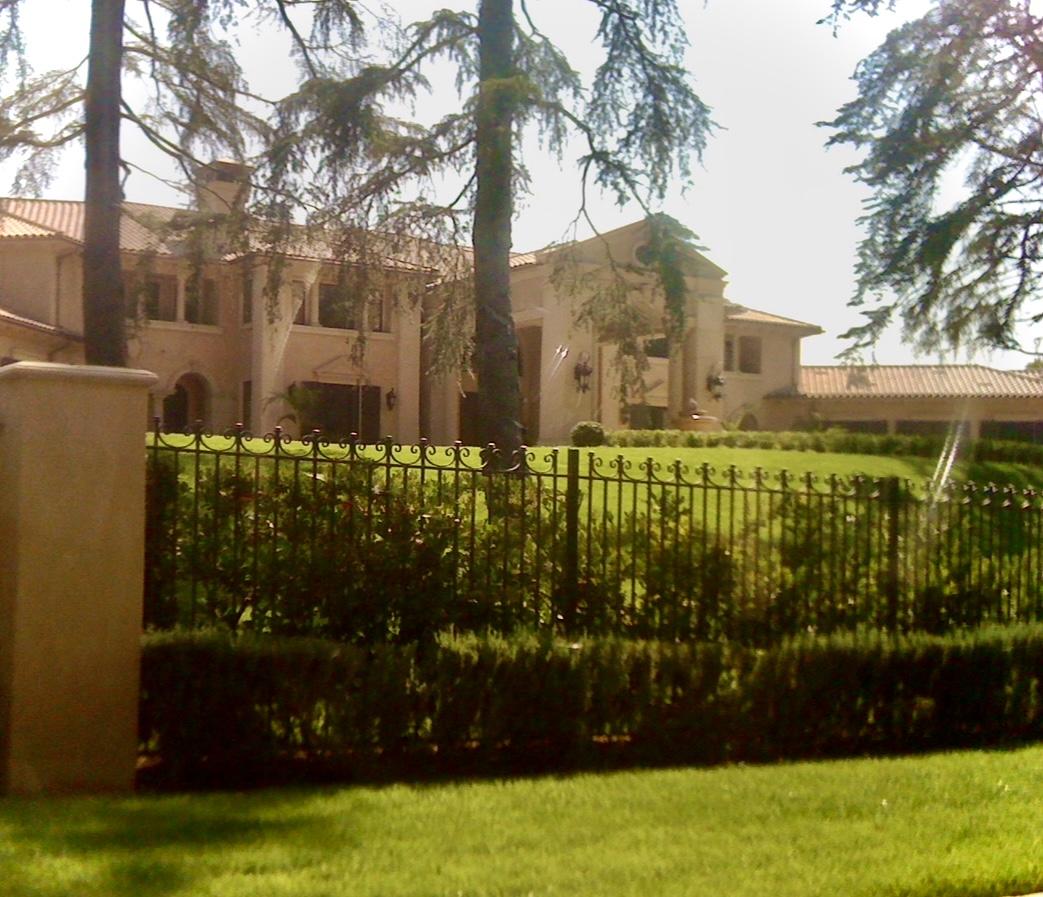
A house in Bradbury

Bradbury is a city in the San Gabriel Valley region of Los Angeles County, California, United States. It is located in the foothills of the San Gabriel Mountains below Angeles National Forest. Bradbury is bordered by the city of Monrovia to the west and south, and Duarte to the south and east. The population was 921 at the 2020 census, down from 1,048 at the 2010 census. The city has three distinct areas—the Bradbury Estates, which is a gated community consisting of 5-acre (20,000 m^{2}) minimum estates; Woodlyn Lane, which is also a gated community with minimum 2-acre (8,100 m^{2}) lots; and the balance of the city, which is not gated, which has lots generally ranging in size from 7,500 square feet (700 m^{2}) to 1-acre (4,000 m^{2}). A significant portion of the properties in Bradbury Estates and Woodlyn Lane is zoned for horses, and several horse ranches still exist in these communities today.

== History ==
Bradbury was founded by Lewis L. Bradbury on the homestead of Rancho Azusa de Duarte in 1881. In 1912, the Bradburys' daughter, Minerva, married Isaac Polk and built a grand mansion on the property which they named Chateau Bradbury. After years of annexation attempts by the city of Monrovia, Bradbury incorporated in 1957. The paperwork for incorporation arrived in a rush to prevent the area from becoming part of the new city of Duarte, which also incorporated on the same day, August 22, 1957. Still, many ties between the two communities remain in that they both form the Duarte Unified School District; they both share the same post office and the 91008 ZIP code; and they both share combined public services such as the Los Angeles County Sheriff's Department and Los Angeles County Fire Department.

== Geography ==
According to the United States Census Bureau, the city has a total area of 2.0 square miles (5.2 km^{2}), over 99% of which is land.

== Demographics ==
Historical population
Census	Pop.	Note	%±
1960	618		—
1970	838		35.6%
1980	846		1.0%
1990	829		−2.0%
2000	855		3.1%
2010	1,048		22.6%
2020	921		−12.1%
U.S. Decennial Census; 1860–1870 1880-1890; 1900 1910 1920; 1930 1940 1950; 1960 1970 1980; 1990 2000 2010; 2020

Bradbury first appeared as a city in the 1960 U.S. census.

=== Racial and ethnic composition ===
Bradbury city, California – Racial and ethnic composition Note: the US Census treats Hispanic/Latino as an ethnic category. This table excludes Latinos from the racial categories and assigns them to a separate category. Hispanics/Latinos may be of any race.
Race / Ethnicity (NH = Non-Hispanic)	Pop 2000	Pop 2010	Pop 2020	% 2000	% 2010	% 2020
White alone (NH)	539	514	335	63.04%	49.05%	36.37%
Black or African American alone (NH)	12	20	17	1.40%	1.91%	1.85%
Native American or Alaska Native alone (NH)	2	0	1	0.23%	0.00%	0.11%
Asian alone (NH)	167	270	350	19.53%	25.76%	38.00%
Native Hawaiian or Pacific Islander alone (NH)	0	0	0	0.00%	0.00%	0.00%
Other race alone (NH)	3	2	4	0.35%	0.19%	0.43%
Mixed race or Multiracial (NH)	13	24	30	1.52%	2.29%	3.26%
Hispanic or Latino (any race)	119	218	184	13.92%	20.80%	19.98%
Total	855	1,048	921	100.00%	100.00%	100.00%

=== 2020 census ===
As of the 2020 census, Bradbury had a population of 921. The median age was 50.8 years. 16.2% of residents were under the age of 18 and 22.6% of residents were 65 years of age or older. For every 100 females there were 98.1 males, and for every 100 females age 18 and over there were 95.4 males age 18 and over.

83.3% of residents lived in urban areas, while 16.7% lived in rural areas.

There were 311 households in Bradbury, of which 32.2% had children under the age of 18 living in them. Of all households, 60.8% were married-couple households, 15.1% were households with a male householder and no spouse or partner present, and 19.9% were households with a female householder and no spouse or partner present. About 13.2% of all households were made up of individuals and 6.7% had someone living alone who was 65 years of age or older.

There were 357 housing units, of which 12.9% were vacant. The homeowner vacancy rate was 4.7% and the rental vacancy rate was 16.7%.

=== 2010 ===
At the 2010 census Bradbury had a population of 1,048. The population density was 535.0 inhabitants per square mile (206.6/km^{2}). The racial makeup of Bradbury was 652 (62.2%) White (49.0% Non-Hispanic White), 22 (2.1%) African American, 4 (0.4%) Native American, 276 (26.3%) Asian, 0 (0.0%) Pacific Islander, 59 (5.6%) from other races, and 35 (3.3%) from two or more races. Hispanic or Latino of any race were 218 people (20.8%).

The whole population lived in households, no one lived in non-institutionalized group quarters and no one was institutionalized.

There were 354 households, 92 (26.0%) had children under the age of 18 living in them, 231 (65.3%) were opposite-sex married couples living together, 27 (7.6%) had a female householder with no husband present, 15 (4.2%) had a male householder with no wife present. There were 18 (5.1%) unmarried opposite-sex partnerships, and 2 (0.6%) same-sex married couples or partnerships. 61 households (17.2%) were one person and 24 (6.8%) had someone living alone who was 65 or older. The average household size was 2.96. There were 273 families (77.1% of households); the average family size was 3.27.

The age distribution was 173 people (16.5%) under the age of 18, 84 people (8.0%) aged 18 to 24, 196 people (18.7%) aged 25 to 44, 386 people (36.8%) aged 45 to 64, and 209 people (19.9%) who were 65 or older. The median age was 49.1 years. For every 100 females, there were 94.1 males. For every 100 females age 18 and over, there were 89.0 males.

There were 400 housing units at an average density of 204.2 per square mile, of the occupied units 307 (86.7%) were owner-occupied and 47 (13.3%) were rented. The homeowner vacancy rate was 1.0%; the rental vacancy rate was 7.8%. 934 people (89.1% of the population) lived in owner-occupied housing units and 114 people (10.9%) lived in rental housing units.

=== 2000 ===
At the 2000 census there were 855 people in 284 households, including 239 families, in the city. The population density was 447.3 inhabitants per square mile (172.7/km^{2}). There were 311 housing units at an average density of 162.7 per square mile (62.8/km^{2}). The racial makeup of the city was 70.53% White, 1.75% Black or African American, 0.23% Native American, 19.53% Asian, 5.61% from other races, and 2.34% from two or more races. 13.92% of the population were Hispanic or Latino of any race. Of the 284 households 33.1% had children under the age of 18 living with them, 69.4% were married couples living together, 8.8% had a female householder with no husband present, and 15.5% were non-families. 12.0% of households were one person and 3.9% were one person aged 65 or older. The average household size was 3.01 and the average family size was 3.21.

The age distribution was 24.7% under the age of 18, 5.7% from 18 to 24, 25.5% from 25 to 44, 28.8% from 45 to 64, and 15.3% 65 or older. The median age was 42 years. For every 100 females, there were 90.4 males. For every 100 females age 18 and over, there were 95.2 males.

The median household income was $100,454 and the median family income was $106,736. Males had a median income of $56,250 versus $40,000 for females. The per capita income for the city was $57,717. None of the families and 2.0% of the population were living below the poverty line, including no under eighteens and none of those over 64.

== Government ==
In the California State Legislature, Bradbury is in the 22nd senatorial district, represented by Democrat Susan Rubio, and in the 41st Assembly district, represented by Democrat John Harabedian.

In the United States House of Representatives, Bradbury is in California's 31st congressional district, represented by Democrat Gil Cisneros.

Bradbury had voted for the Republican presidential nominee in every election for president since at least 1964 in which there was a verifiable vote total. In 1992, 100 of the 105 votes for third-party candidates were cast for independent candidate Ross Perot In 2016, Bradbury was one of only five cities in Los Angeles County that voted for Donald Trump over Hillary Rodham Clinton In 2020, the city voted for Joe Biden, marking the first time it voted for a Democrat for president since its incorporation.

== Education ==
Bradbury and Duarte are both served by the Duarte Unified School District.

== Infrastructure ==
=== Public safety ===
The Los Angeles County Sheriff's Department (LASD) serves Bradbury through the operation of the Duarte satellite substation as well as the Temple Station in Temple City.

The Los Angeles County Fire Department provides fire protection services, their services assigned to Station 44 in Duarte with backup paramedic assistance from Stations 29 in Baldwin Park and 32 in Azusa, as well as the Monrovia Fire Department.

== Notable people ==
- Danny Bakewell, civil rights activist and businessman
- Gale Banks, race car driver and founder of Gale Banks Engineering
- Adrián Beltré (former), baseball player, former member of the Texas Rangers
- Babe Dahlgren (deceased), baseball player
- Kent Desormeaux (former), jockey, member of racing hall of fame
- Lap Shun Hui, tech entrepreneur; co-founder of eMachines and former owner of Packard Bell
- Zhang Jizhong, prominent Chinese film producer
- Adam Kolawa (deceased), software developer and co-founder of Parasoft
- Richard E. Mandella (former), horse trainer, member of racing hall of fame
- Corey Nakatani (former), jockey
- Peter Popoff, televangelist
- Yang Rong, billionaire Chinese automotive tycoon
- Ahmed bin Salman bin Abdulaziz Al Saud (deceased), Saudi Arabian prince
- Lynsi Snyder, former resident, owner of and heiress to In-N-Out Burger
- Alex Solis (former), jockey
- Mickey Thompson (deceased), race car driver, murdered at his home in Bradbury.
- R. Stanley Williams (former), nanotechnologist
