= Ted Waitt =

American billionaire

- Born: January 18, 1963 (age 63); Sioux City, Iowa, U.S.
- Known for: Co-founder of Gateway, Inc.
- Spouses: Joan Peschel (divorced): Michele Merkin
- Children: 4

Theodore William "Ted" Waitt (born January 18, 1963) is an American billionaire businessman and philanthropist. Waitt is a co-founder of Gateway, Inc.

== Career ==
On September 5, 1985, Waitt, his brother Norm Jr., and Mike Hammond started Gateway 2000 with a $10,000 loan secured by Waitt's grandmother. The company began on Waitt's father's cattle ranch in Sioux City, Iowa, moved to Sergeant Bluff, Iowa and later to North Sioux City, South Dakota, where they continued to develop their "down-home" branding, complete with computer boxes printed in a black and white Holstein cow pattern.

Waitt led a move of the company's headquarters from South Dakota to Poway, California in 1998. Waitt relinquished his post as CEO of Gateway in late 1999 to Jeffrey Weitzen, but returned to the post in January 2001.

In 2004, after the acquisition of eMachines, Waitt turned over day-to-day operations of Gateway and the title of CEO to Wayne Inouye, the former CEO of eMachines. In May 2005, he resigned as chairman of the company, ending a near 20-year run with the company he co-founded.

Waitt has been featured on numerous lists by Forbes magazine. He has held a spot on both the Forbes 400 Richest in America as well as Forbes list of the World's Billionaires. He has also been listed on Fortune Magazines "40 Richest Under 40", a list of the 40 wealthiest self-made Americans under the age of 40 in the United States. The 2008 Forbes 400 List listed Waitt with a net worth estimated at $1.4 billion. Waitt fell off the Forbes 400 list in 2009 with a net worth estimate of $900 million. Forbes speculated that the drop from the previous year was as a result of "souring real estate" and a divorce settlement.

According to the September 2002 issue of Fortune Magazine, Waitt sold $1.1 billion in Gateway stock during the dot-com era. In August 2007, Gateway was acquired by Acer Inc. for $1.90 per share or $710 million.

He has gone on to form four enterprises that are his chief interests: Avalon Capital Group, Inc., a wholly owned, billion-dollar private investment company with diverse interests in technology, health care, energy, finance, and real estate; and the Waitt Foundation, Waitt Institute and Waitt Institute for Violence Prevention, nonprofit organizations dedicated to the improvement of mankind's knowledge through historical and scientific exploration.

Waitt was chairman of the Salk Institute for Biological Studies board of trustees from November 2016 to November 2017. He had joined the board in 2004 and has had numerous roles while donating millions of dollars to the institute.

== Personal life ==
Waitt is married to former model Michele Merkin. He and his first wife Joan Theresa Peschel had four children. Waitt's eldest daughter, Hailey, is married to former soccer player Jordan Gafa.

Waitt was romantically linked from 2003 to 2010 to Ghislaine Maxwell. She attended the wedding of Chelsea Clinton in 2010 as Waitt’s guest. Maxwell helped Waitt obtain and renovate the luxury yacht Plan B, and they traveled on it to France and Croatia before their relationship ended in late 2010 or early 2011. Maxwell, known for being a long time associate of Jeffrey Epstein, was convicted of child sex trafficking in 2021.

On 30 April 2026, Waitt was interviewed by the House Oversight Committee on Ghislaine Maxwell. No new information was found, though in unusual testimony, Waitt did admit to paying Maxwell several million dollars when their romantic relationship ended.

== Awards and honors ==
Waitt was awarded an honorary doctorate by the University of South Dakota.

== Philanthropy ==
Business Week named Waitt one of America's 50 most generous philanthropists due to his work with the Waitt Foundation. The Foundation funds partnerships and projects, sometimes in conjunction or collaboration with the Waitt Institutes, focused on marine conservation.

Established in 1993, and headquartered in La Jolla, California, the Foundation initially focused on domestic violence prevention and community development.

In collaboration and with the support of the Waitt Family Foundation, the Foresight Institute aimed to “identify the gap between the basic nanostructured materials of today, and the potential…”

The press release notes that the Waitt Family Foundation is affiliated with 3 institutes, the Institute for Historical Discovery, Institute for Violence Prevention, and Institute for Scientific Breakthroughs. The Foundation was led by John Heubusch at the time.

The Waitt Institute is a founding member, along with National Geographic Pristine Seas, Oceans 5, and Dynamic Planet, of the Blue Prosperity Coalition which aims to support governments in sustainable oceans management by providing financing, expertise, and tools to create marine protected areas (MPA).

In November 2019, the Blue Prosperity Coalition announced a ten-year, $150 million commitment from the Waitt Foundation towards its ocean conservation efforts. In September 2016, the Waitt Foundation joined with the Wildlife Conservation Society (WCS), the blue moon fund (bmf), and the Global Environmental Facility (GEF) to commit a combined $48 million towards expansion of the world's marine protected areas (MPA). In May 2008, the Salk Institute for Biological Studies announced the grant of $20 million from the Waitt Foundation to fund the creation of an Advanced Biophotonics Center. In December 2008, the William J. Clinton Foundation released a list of all contributors. It included Theodore Waitt, who gave between $10–25 million. In April 2011, the Sioux City Public Museum had its grand opening. $4 million of its $13 million development budget was donated by the Waitt Foundation.

== Taxon named after him ==
- Photonectes waitti is a species of deep-sea fish.
