= Michael Harris (offensive lineman, born 1988) =

American football player (born 1988)

Mike Harris
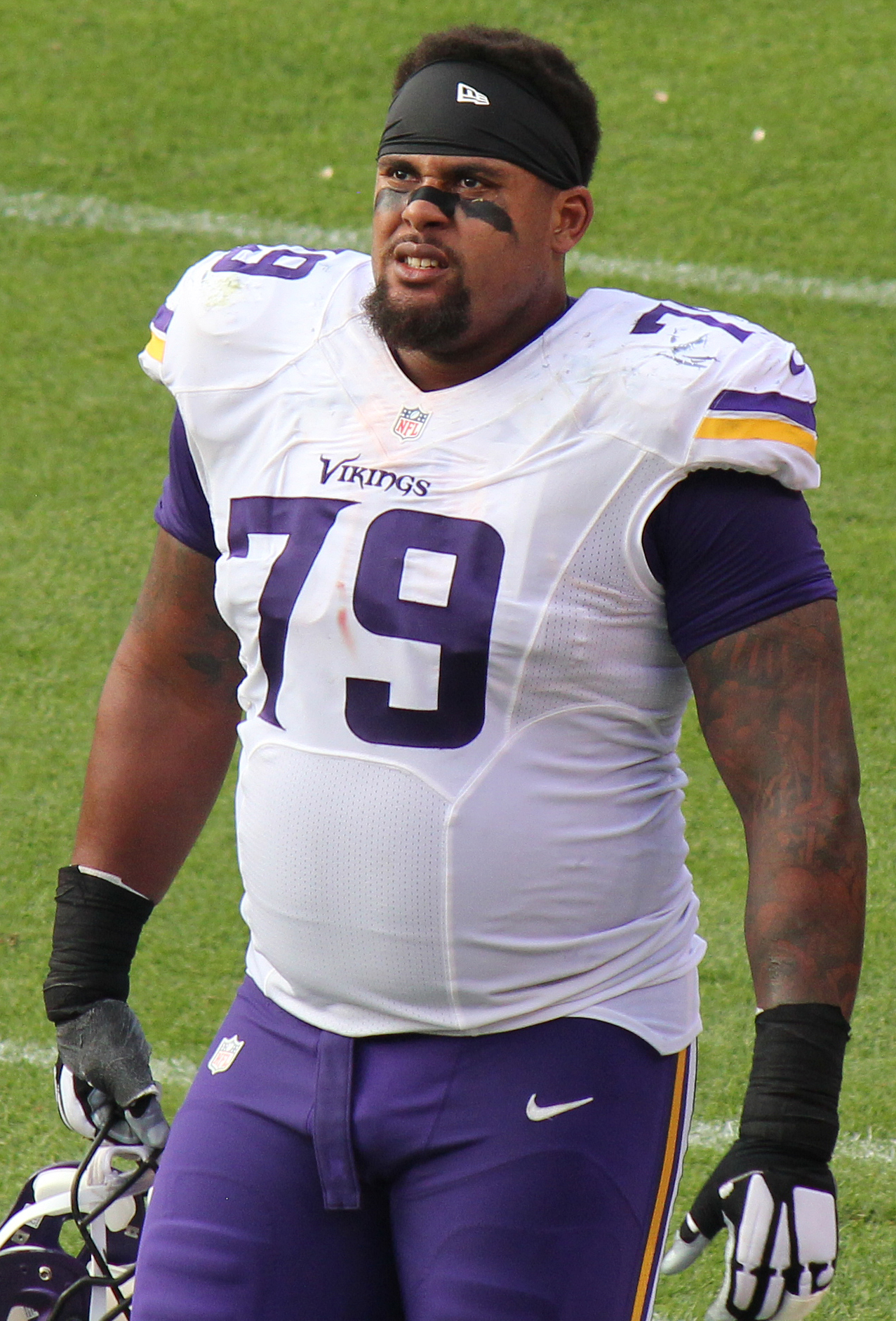
- Harris with the Minnesota Vikings in 2015

No. 79
- Position: Guard

Personal information
- Born: December 5, 1988 (age 37); Oakland, California, U.S.
- Listed height: 6 ft 5 in (1.96 m)
- Listed weight: 338 lb (153 kg)

Career information
- High school: Duarte (Duarte, California)
- College: UCLA
- NFL draft: 2012: undrafted

Career history
- San Diego Chargers (2012–2013); Minnesota Vikings (2014–2016)

Career NFL statistics
- Games played: 48
- Games started: 33
- Stats at Pro Football Reference

Michael Cory Harris (born December 5, 1988) is an American former professional football player who was a guard in the National Football League (NFL). He played college football for the UCLA Bruins. He was signed by the San Diego Chargers as an undrafted free agent on April 30, 2012. He was also a member of the Minnesota Vikings.

== Early life ==
Harris lettered four years in football at Duarte High School in Duarte, California for coach Wardell Crutchfield as an offensive and defensive tackle. He was a second-team All-Montview League selection as a junior in 2004 after totalling 57 tackles, three sacks and one fumble recovery on defense and 20 pancake blocks on offense. As a senior in 2005, he was credited with 86 tackles, eight sacks, two fumble recoveries and 34 pancake blocks, helping lead his team to a 10–3 record and to the third round of the CIF playoffs. He was chosen 2005 MVP Lineman of the Year in the Montview League. He was also named 2005 first-team All-State (Small Schools) by Cal-Hi Sports and was selected to the CIF-Southern Section Mid-Valley team in 2005.

Harris was also member of the ″1000 pound Weightlifting Club″ at his school and lettered four years in basketball (center) and three years in track & field (shot put).

Rated as the No. 27 offensive guard nationally and the No. 5 offensive guard in the state of California by Scout.com. He was regarded as a three-star prospect by both Scout.com and Rivals.com.

== College career ==
In 2008, he was hampered by a sprained ankle early in the season but he made outstanding progress down the stretch and was the Offensive winner of UCLA's Captain Don Brown Memorial Award for Most Improved Player.

In 2009, he started all 13 games at right tackle, one of three linemen to accomplish that feat . He played virtually every snap of each game and was on the field for at least 56 snaps in each contest and was Offensive co-winner of UCLA's Captain Don Brown Memorial Award for Most Improved Player.

In 2011, Harris started in all 14 games at tackle and played virtually every offensive snap on the season. Harris has developed steadily during his career and was a starter in parts of all four seasons. He finished his career with 42 career starts along the Bruin offensive line.

== Professional career ==
=== San Diego Chargers ===
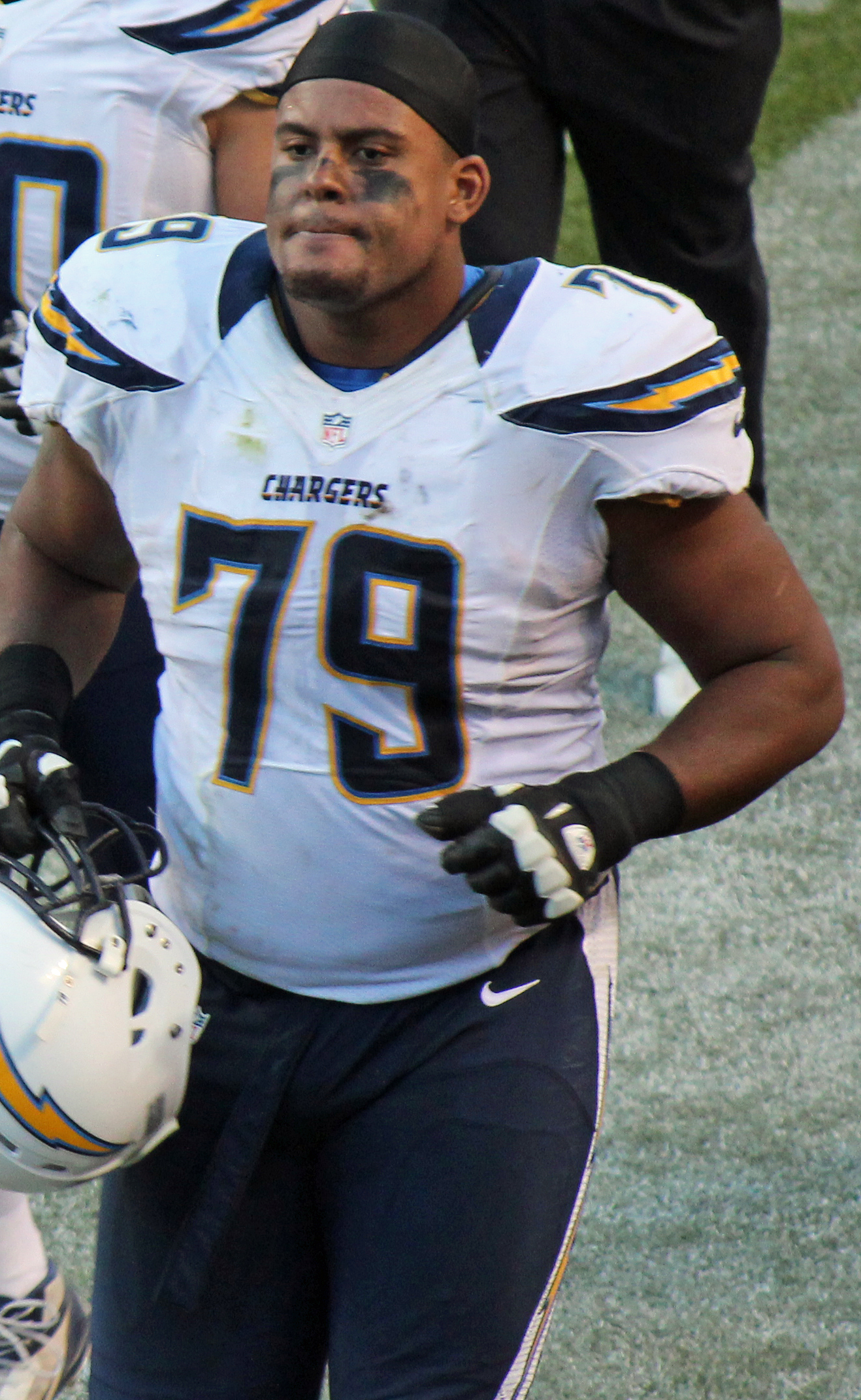
Harris in 2012

Harris had his first-career start on ESPN's Monday Night Football against the Oakland Raiders when injuries kept incumbent starter Jared Gaither off the field during training camp. Harris had an inconsistent rookie season but he ended up playing in 15 games with nine starts. On October 9, 2013, Harris was placed on IR. He had started 3 games in 2013.

Harris was released on August 30, 2014.

=== Minnesota Vikings ===
Harris signed with the Minnesota Vikings on August 31, 2014. On March 9, 2016, Harris re-signed a one-year contract with the Minnesota Vikings. On August 30, 2016, Harris was placed on the reserve/NFI list.

On February 10, 2017, Harris was released by the Vikings.

== Personal life ==
His biggest thrill in sports was catching a screen pass for a touchdown in his junior season at Duarte and lists former NFL star Jonathan Ogden as the player he admires the most. He lives in Minnesota with his wife, Melissa Dettinger Harris and their 3 dogs.
