= Nate Jacquet =

American football player (born 1975)

No. 18, 19, 88, 89, 83
- Position: Wide receiver

Personal information
- Born: September 2, 1975 (age 51); Duarte, California, U.S.
- Listed height: 6 ft 0 in (1.83 m)
- Listed weight: 185 lb (84 kg)

Career information
- High school: Duarte
- College: San Diego State
- NFL draft: 1997: 5th round, 150th overall pick

Career history
- Indianapolis Colts (1997); Miami Dolphins (1998–1999); San Diego Chargers (2000); Minnesota Vikings (2000–2001); Chicago Bears (2002)*; Carolina Panthers (2002)
- * Offseason or practice squad member only

Career NFL statistics
- Receptions: 10
- Receiving yards: 165
- Return yards: 2,174
- Stats at Pro Football Reference

Nathaniel Martin Jacquet (born September 2, 1975) is an American former professional football player who was a wide receiver in the National Football League (NFL). He was selected by the Indianapolis Colts in the fifth round of the 1997 NFL draft. He played college football for the San Diego State Aztecs.

Jacquet also played for the Miami Dolphins, San Diego Chargers, Minnesota Vikings and Carolina Panthers.
