= EMachines eOne =

Desktop computer

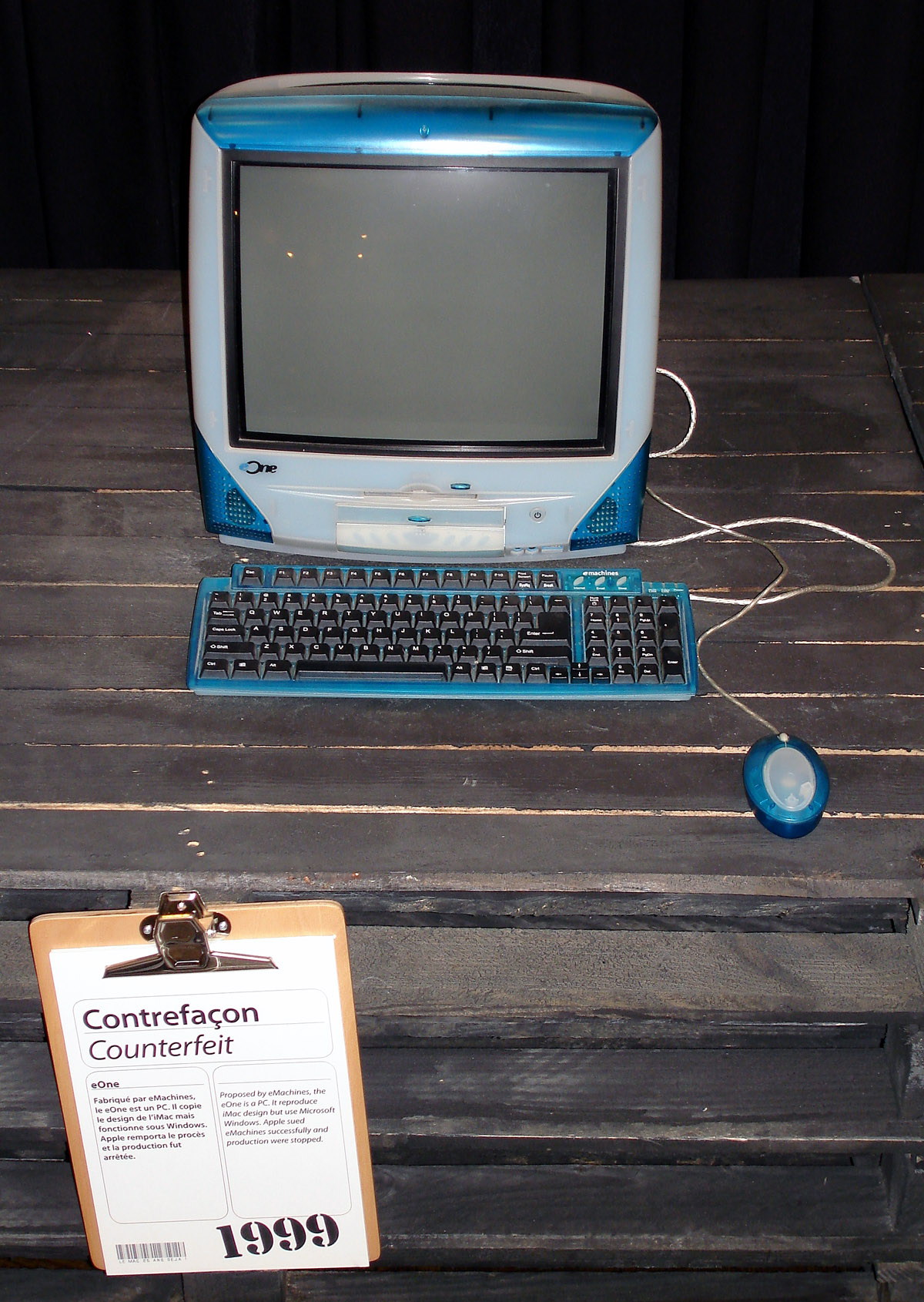
An eOne (described as a "counterfeit Mac running Windows") at the Computer Science Museum in Hauts-de-Seine, France

The eOne is an all-in-one desktop computer that was produced by eMachines and introduced on August 5, 1999. It resembles Apple's "Bondi Blue" iMac.

Apple sued eMachines for allegedly infringing upon the distinctive trade dress of the iMac with the eOne. Apple and eMachines settled the case in 2000, which required the model to be discontinued.

== History and legal issues ==
Upon its release in 1999, the eOne came with a translucent "cool blue" case, while the original iMac had a two-toned case with "Bondi Blue" accents. At US$799, the eOne was also cheaper than the US$1,199 iMac. eMachines hoped to avoid legal trouble because the shape of the computer was different from the iMac. However, Apple sued eMachines, alleging that the computer's design infringed upon the protected trade dress of the iMac. In March 2000, eMachines reached a settlement with Apple, under which it agreed to discontinue the infringing model.

The eOne was available at Circuit City and Micro Center, but it did not sell well in the few months when it was available due to a lawsuit from Apple which eventually caused the eOne to be widely considered a failure for eMachines. The eOne was discontinued in 2000, and due to its lackluster sales, is rare in the secondary market.

== Technical specifications ==
The eOne had a 433 MHz Intel Celeron microprocessor, 64 megabytes of PC-100 SDRAM RAM, a 15-inch CRT monitor, a 10BASE-T Ethernet port, a floppy drive, an 8 MB ATI video card, a 56k modem, and a CD-ROM drive, along with the ability to use two PC cards, which were commonly used to expand the capabilities of laptops.

As a Wintel-based computer, the eOne ran Windows 98 or Windows Me depending on the time of manufacture, as opposed to the iMac running Mac OS 8 or Mac OS 9.

== Legacy ==
In 2007, three years after acquiring eMachines, Gateway released the One, an all-in-one desktop computer similar to the eOne but in black and utilizing a flat-screen monitor.
