= Duarte High School =

Coordinates: 34.136763°N 117.971088°W

Location
- 1565 East Central Avenue; Duarte, California; United States

Information
- Type: Public
- School district: Duarte Unified School District
- Principal: Luis Haro
- Staff: 35.93 (FTE)
- Grades: 9-12
- Enrollment: 770 (2023-2024)
- Student to teacher ratio: 21.43
- Campus type: Suburban
- Colors: Blue and white
- Athletics conference: CIF Southern Section; Montview League
- Mascot: Falcon
- Rival: Monrovia High School
- Website: duartehigh.duarteusd.org

Duarte High School is a public high school located in Duarte, California and is part of Duarte Unified School District. Duarte High School had 764 students enrolled as of 2024. Their mascot is the falcon. It was recognized as a California Distinguished School in 2007 for its high test scores and academic achievement.

Duarte High was recognized in Newsweek as one of the top public high schools in the United States. See below for detailed rankings.

== School information ==
- Duarte School first opened in 1909 in the old schoolhouse that is now The Old Spaghetti Factory. Duarte High School opened in 1958. Prior to that time Duarte high school students attended Monrovia High School. (The Wildcats.)
- Duarte High School is a part of the Montview league. In 2010 Duarte implemented academies, allowing students to take classes that are aimed to focus on their interests. In addition, these academies allow the students to share similar classes with those students in the same academy. The goal of implementing academies is to prepare students for advanced education as well as furthering their knowledge in a desired field.

== Notable alumni ==
- Dennis Weathersby, NFL Player
- Nate Jacquet, NFL player
- Daimon Shelton, NFL player
- Carlos Fisher, MLB player
- Cary-Hiroyuki Tagawa, Japanese-American Actor
- Mike Harris, NFL player
- Sam Shepard, American playwright, actor, and television and film director

== Newsweek rankings ==
The table below shows the rankings that Duarte High School received since being recognized as Newsweek's America's Top Public Schools in 2006.

- 2008 - #1264
- 2007 - #1286
- 2006 - #1115
