= InFocus =

American company

Infocus

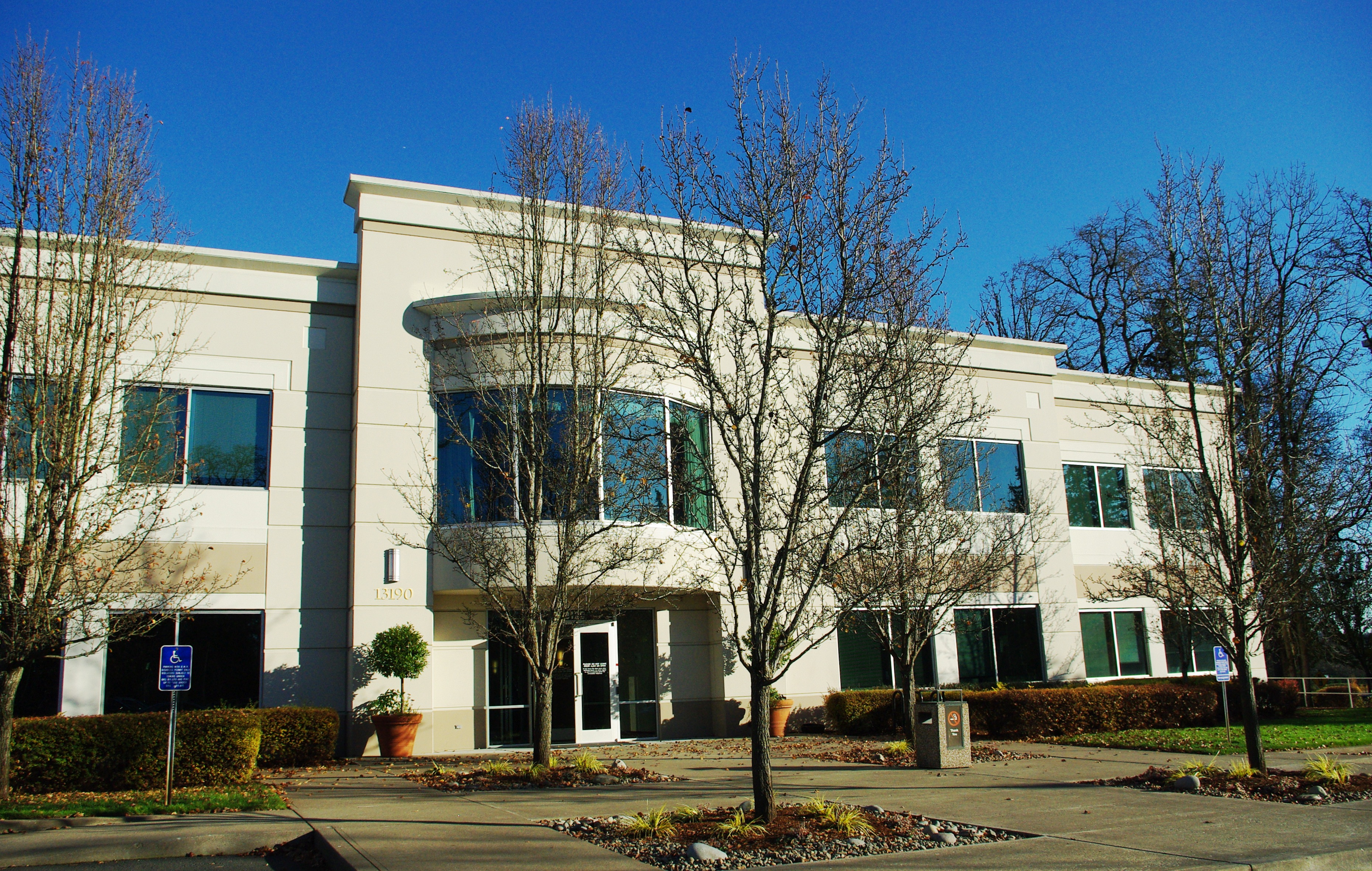
- Headquarters in Tigard, Oregon
- Company type: Private
- Industry: Collaboration Technology
- Founded: 1986
- Headquarters: Tigard, Oregon, USA; 45.42511°N 122.745008°W
- Key people: Randy Arnold, President; Loren Shaw, VP Marketing; Jim Reddy, GM US and EMEA Sales; Peter Ho, VP APAC Sales; Mike Driscoll, GM Jupiter by Infocus; Surendra Arora, VP Strategic Relationships and Business Development
- Products: DLP projectors, LCD projectors, large-format touch PCs and displays, video phones, video calling services, LED televisions tablets, software, smartphones
- Number of employees: 220 worldwide (2015)
- Website: infocus.com

InFocus Corporation is a privately owned American company based in the state of Oregon. Founded in 1986, the company develops, manufactures, and distributes DLP and LCD projectors and accessories as well as large-format touch displays, software, LED televisions, tablets and smartphones. InFocus also offers video calling services. Formerly a NASDAQ listed public company, InFocus was purchased by Image Holdings Corp., owned by John Hui, in 2009 and is now a wholly owned subsidiary headquartered in Tigard, Oregon.

== History ==
InFocus was formed by Steve Hix and Paul Gulick in 1986. It is one of three companies in the computer display industry started by people who formerly worked for Tektronix along with Planar Systems and Clarity Visual Systems. The company moved into a new headquarters building in Wilsonville, Oregon, in 2002. At that time the company employed 1,200 people.

In mid-2005 InFocus acquired the company TUN (The University Network), which provided digital media and thin screen television advertising to colleges, and then sold it in late 2006 to Submedia LLC. The company later became a publicly traded company on the NASDAQ exchange as INFS. On May 28, 2009, InFocus was taken private by Image Holdings Corporation and John Hui in a transaction valued at $39 million. In October 2009, they announced plans to move to Tigard, Oregon in December 2009 as their old headquarters were too big for the much smaller new company. The company was down to 110 employees at the time of the move, with just over half at the headquarters. As of 2012, the company had further shrunk to 90 employees and revenues of about $150 million. As of 2014, the company employed 120 people and is one of Oregon's 25 largest homegrown technology companies. In September 2015 InFocus named long-time board member, Mark Housely CEO. In October 2015 InFocus acquired Jupiter Systems, a company based in Hayward, California which developed video wall and collaboration systems.

== Products ==
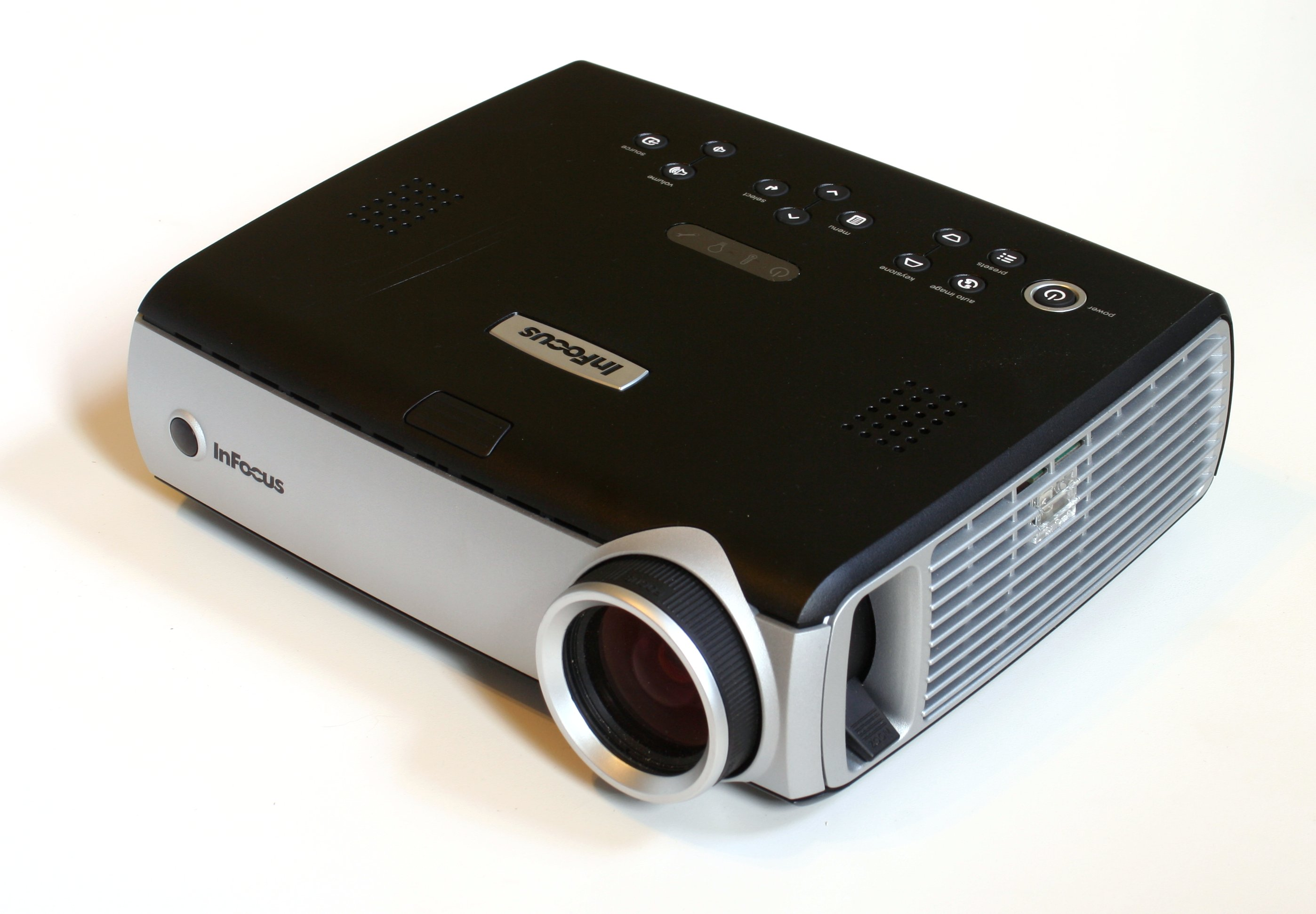
InFocus projector

InFocus produces DLP and LCD projectors and LCD flat panel touchscreens for business users, educators, government entities, ProAV customers, mobile professionals and home theater enthusiasts. One touchscreen product is the Mondopad that is targeted at business and education customers. The Mondopad is a large-format high definition touchscreen PC with software for presenting, whiteboarding and videoconferencing. Other products include: BigTouch large-format touch PC, JTouch large-format touch display, MVP100 Video Phone, Q Tablet, and numerous accessories and peripherals. The company also produces software for digital annotation and video calling.

The company provides point-to-point and multi-endpoint video calling services as well called 121 Video Calling and ConX Video Meeting, respectively.

InFocus owns and operates the ASK Proxima brand, and in the past sold products under the names ASK, Proxima, and InFocus ScreenPlay.

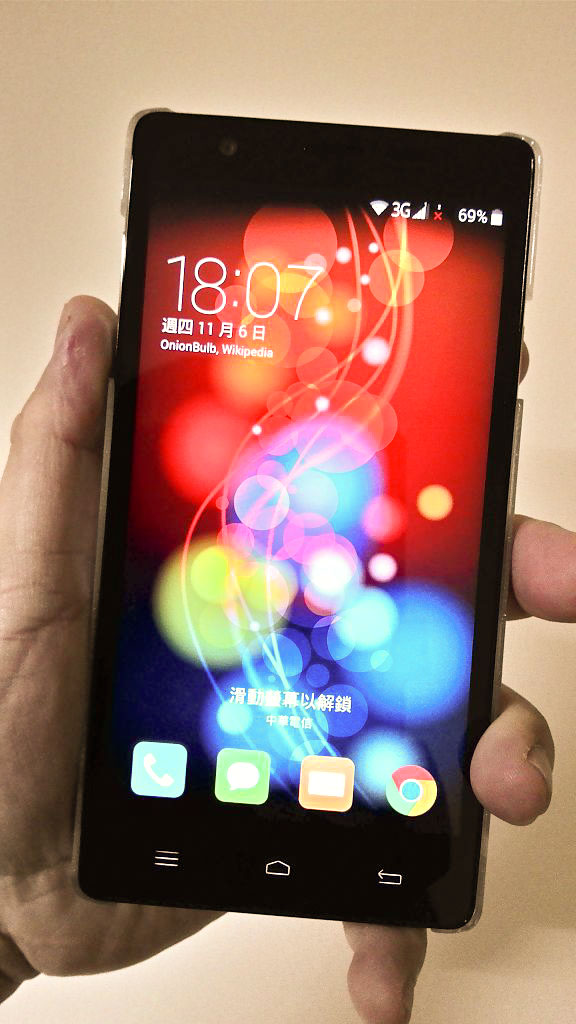
InFocus smartphone

In 2013, InFocus began offering budget high-specification smartphones, tablets and LED televisions in China, Taiwan, India and other East Asian markets in partnership with FIH Mobile Ltd. (富智康) and Foxconn (鴻海精密). The company announced its official entry into the Indian market in July 2015 at a press conference in New Delhi, followed by an expansion into key Middle Eastern, North African and South Asian emerging markets. The current range of InFocus smartphones includes the metallic unibody M812 and M808 models, the InFocus M550-3D with 3D image capture & naked eye 3D display technology, and the entry-level M370. In 2016, Infocus launched several budget end smartphones, tablets and low-end to high-end LED televisions in India.

In June 2017, InFocus launched the Turbo5 and Snap 4 Smartphones in India. Over the years, the company has built 409 service/e-waste-management centers across India. In 2018, InFocus launched the Vision 3 series with 5.7" full screen display and AL/proximity sensors.

== See also ==
- InFocus Epic 1, a smartphone marketed by InFocus
- InFocus M810, a smartphone marketed by InFocus
- List of companies based in Oregon
