= 2023 Davis, California stabbings =

Davis, California stabbings

The 2023 Davis, California stabbings were a series of three stabbings that occurred in Davis, California, between April 27 and May 1, 2023, resulting in two deaths and one critical injury. Former UC Davis student Carlos Reales Dominguez was arrested and initially charged with murder. Following a July 2026 retrial, a Yolo County jury found Dominguez not guilty of murder but convicted him on two counts of involuntary manslaughter and one count of assault. Dominguez subsequently waived his insanity trial, and the judge ruled him legally insane at the time of the crimes, committing him to a state psychiatric hospital.

== Attacks ==
=== First attack ===
On April 27, 2023, at around 11:20 am, police were called for a welfare check for a man found unresponsive on a bench in Central Park, located in downtown Davis. First responders discovered that he had suffered numerous stab wounds, and police began a homicide investigation. It is unknown when the stabbing occurred. The man was later identified as 50-year-old David Henry Breaux, a homeless author and activist known locally as "The Compassion Guy." Breaux was a regular on the streets of Davis, where he greeted people and asked for them to share their personal views on compassion. Breaux had been known to sleep on the bench where he was found.

=== Second attack ===
Two days after the attack on Breaux, a second stabbing occurred on April 29, at Sycamore Park in Davis. The crime happened at approximately 9:15 pm. The victim was identified as Karim Abou Najm, 20, a student at UC Davis and a graduate of Davis High School. He was biking home from an undergraduate conference where he had won an award for his outstanding research and development of software designed to help hearing-impaired people. Like Breaux, he also suffered many stab wounds across his body. The attacker took and fled on Abou Najm's bike, and a man who helped him at the scene provided a description that matched the primary suspect. Abou Najm died of his wounds.

=== Third attack ===
On May 1, shortly before midnight, Kimberlee Guillory, a 64-year-old homeless woman, was stabbed through her tent at an encampment at 2nd and L Street on the outskirts of downtown Davis. She survived the attack and called 911 to report the stabbing. She was hospitalized in critical condition at the UC Davis Medical Center. The suspect was spotted at the encampment by a group of people who provided a description of the attacker, which matched the description given by the eyewitness at the Abou Najm crime scene.

== Perpetrator ==
=== Carlos Reales Dominguez ===
The suspect, 21-year-old Carlos Reales Dominguez, is accused of two murders and one attempted murder. He had previously attended UC Davis until being academically dismissed on April 25, 2023, two days before Breaux’s body was found. A student directory listed Dominguez as a sophomore studying biological sciences. Prior to that, he graduated from Castlemont High School in Oakland, California.

On May 3, 2023, Dominguez was arrested and held without bail, having been spotted by at least 15 people who had called the police tip line and reported that he matched the widely-circulated description of the assailant. Dominguez was located by police in the vicinity of Sycamore Park, the location of the Abou Najm murder. He was wearing the same clothes from the night of the attack on Guillory, which helped bystanders identify him. He had a large knife in his possession at the time of the stop, and police said he also had wounds on his hands and wrists.

During a competency hearing on July 27, 2023, a court-appointed psychologist described him as "a textbook example of schizophrenia". Dominguez was found incompetent to stand trial, and in September, he was moved to Atascadero State Hospital. His trial was placed on hold until he was treated and restored to competency.

On December 20, 2023, Dominguez was declared competent to stand trial and returned to court on January 5, 2024. His trial was initially set to commence on June 18, 2024, but was later postponed to April 28, 2025, due to concerns about his mental fitness.

On June 27, 2025, Dominguez's trial ended in a mistrial after jurors acquitted him of first-degree murder but failed to reach a unanimous verdict on the second-degree murder charges. A retrial was initially scheduled on January 20, 2026 for the unresolved charges, but was delayed to May due to family emergency of one of the prosecutors; the jury selection is set to begin on May 18. Dominguez cannot be retried for first-degree murder.

=== 2025 and 2026 trials ===
In mid-2025, Dominguez's first trial took place. The jury acquitted him of first-degree premeditated murder, but deadlocked on the remaining counts of second-degree murder and attempted murder, resulting in a mistrial.

The retrial concluded on July 21, 2026. The jury found Dominguez guilty of two counts of involuntary manslaughter with deadly weapon enhancements for the deaths of David Breaux and Karim Abou Najm. He was acquitted of second-degree murder and the attempted murder of Kimberlee Guillory. The defense successfully argued that Dominguez's actions were driven by an initial, severe psychotic break caused by untreated schizophrenia, which negated the malice required for a murder conviction, while the prosecution argued his state was worsened by heavy cannabis use.

On July 22, 2026, Yolo County Superior Court Judge Samuel McAdam ruled that Dominguez was legally insane at the time of the attacks after the prosecution waived a sanity trial. As a result of the insanity ruling, Dominguez will be committed to a secure state mental hospital indefinitely rather than a state prison. A formal sentencing and placement hearing was scheduled for August 19, 2026.

== David Henry Breaux ==
David Henry Breaux better known as "the Compassion Guy", was an American activist and author in Davis, California. A homeless man, Breaux had been known for his interactions with residents and passersby in Davis, where he habitually sat on a bench at the corner of Third and C streets and asked passersby to contribute to a notebook with their definition of compassion. In April 2023 he was murdered as the first victim in the stabbings.

=== Early life and education ===
Breaux's mother was a Jamaican immigrant who was diagnosed with schizophrenia. His father was French-Creole and worked as a janitor and was physically and emotionally abusive. He had an older sister and an older brother. He was raised in Duarte, California.

Breaux graduated from Stanford University, where he majored in urban studies.

=== The compassion guy ===
After a breakup with a girlfriend, Breaux became dejected and began "searching for inspiration", according to the New York Times. He discovered the work of Karen Armstrong, who argued that "compassion was inherent to peace". He gave away his possessions and moved to Davis in 2009.

Breaux typically carried a notebook with him, and asked passersby to contribute to it by writing their definition of compassion. Local residents and workers at businesses in the area considered him "a communal therapist of sorts", according to the Times. He was known as "The Compassion Guy".

In 2010 Breaux self-published an e-book, Compassion: A Compilation of Concepts on Compassion, created from the contributions to his notebook. In the same year, a University of California Davis student created a documentary about Breaux.

In 2013 the city of Davis commissioned a bench to be created at the corner of Third and C streets, which members of the community turned into public art and included the words "Compassion is..." Breaux sat on the bench, known as the Compassion Bench, daily.
