= Korea Data Systems =

1984 – mid 2000s South Korean electronics company

Korea Data Systems Co., Ltd.

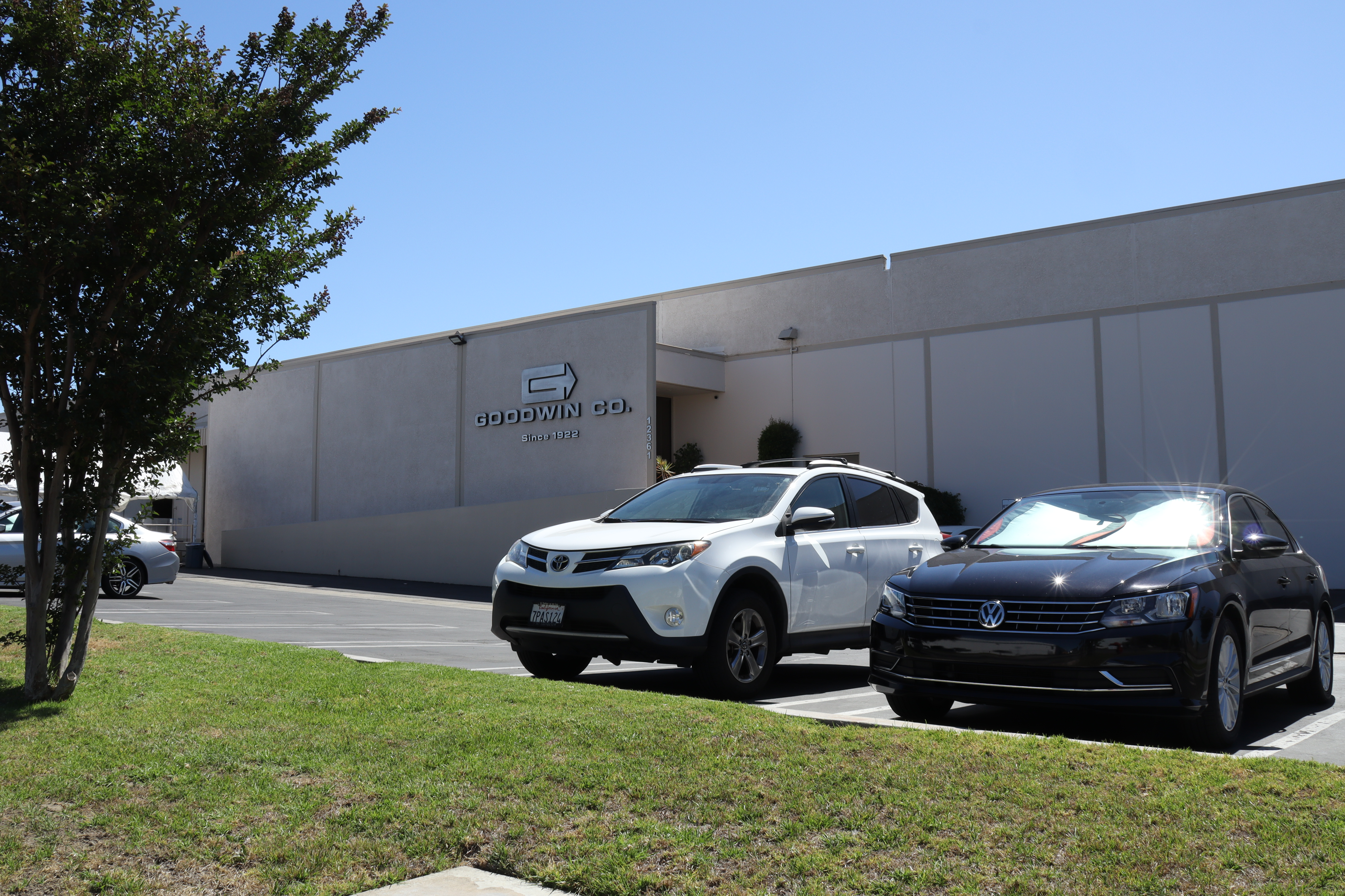
- Site of former American headquarters in Garden Grove, California
- Trade name: KDS
- Native name: 코리아데이타시스템스
- Industry: Computer Technology
- Founded: October 1983; 43 years ago in Seoul, South Korea
- Defunct: 2003
- Fate: Bankruptcy; acquired and absorbed into Konia
- Headquarters: Garden Grove, California, United States (KDS USA)
- Number of employees: 1,200 (1999, peak)
- Parent: Konia Technology Limited (since 2003)
- Divisions: eMachines (1998–2004)

Korea Data Systems Co., Ltd. (Korean: 코리아데이타시스템스, abbreviated KDS), was an international electronics manufacturer based in Seoul, South Korea that manufactured primarily cathode-ray tube (CRT) and liquid-crystal display (LCD) computer monitors. KDS also produced word processors, laptops, and other computer hardware. The company was founded in 1983 and had over 1,200 employees worldwide at its peak. In 1999, it formed an American joint venture with TriGem of Korea and Sotec of Japan, named eMachines, which at its peak in 1999 was the fourth-largest manufacturer of computer systems in the United States.

== History ==
=== Foundation and growth (1983–1997) ===
Korea Data Systems was founded in October 1983 in Seoul. KDS initially manufactured its monitors either unbranded or for computer systems manufacturers to silkscreen their own name on the chassis. At first a manufacturer of basic monochrome cathode-ray tube (CRT) computer monitors, the company diversified in the late 1980s to produce high-end multisync CRT monitors for workstation use, as well as power supply units and word processors.

While monitors remained its primary export outside of South Korea throughout its existence, domestically the company also sold modems, fax machines, and even ultrasound machines. Their fax machines were co-produced by Canon Inc. of Japan, with whom KDS entered a business partnership in 1989.

=== Expansion and computer systems (1997–2001) ===
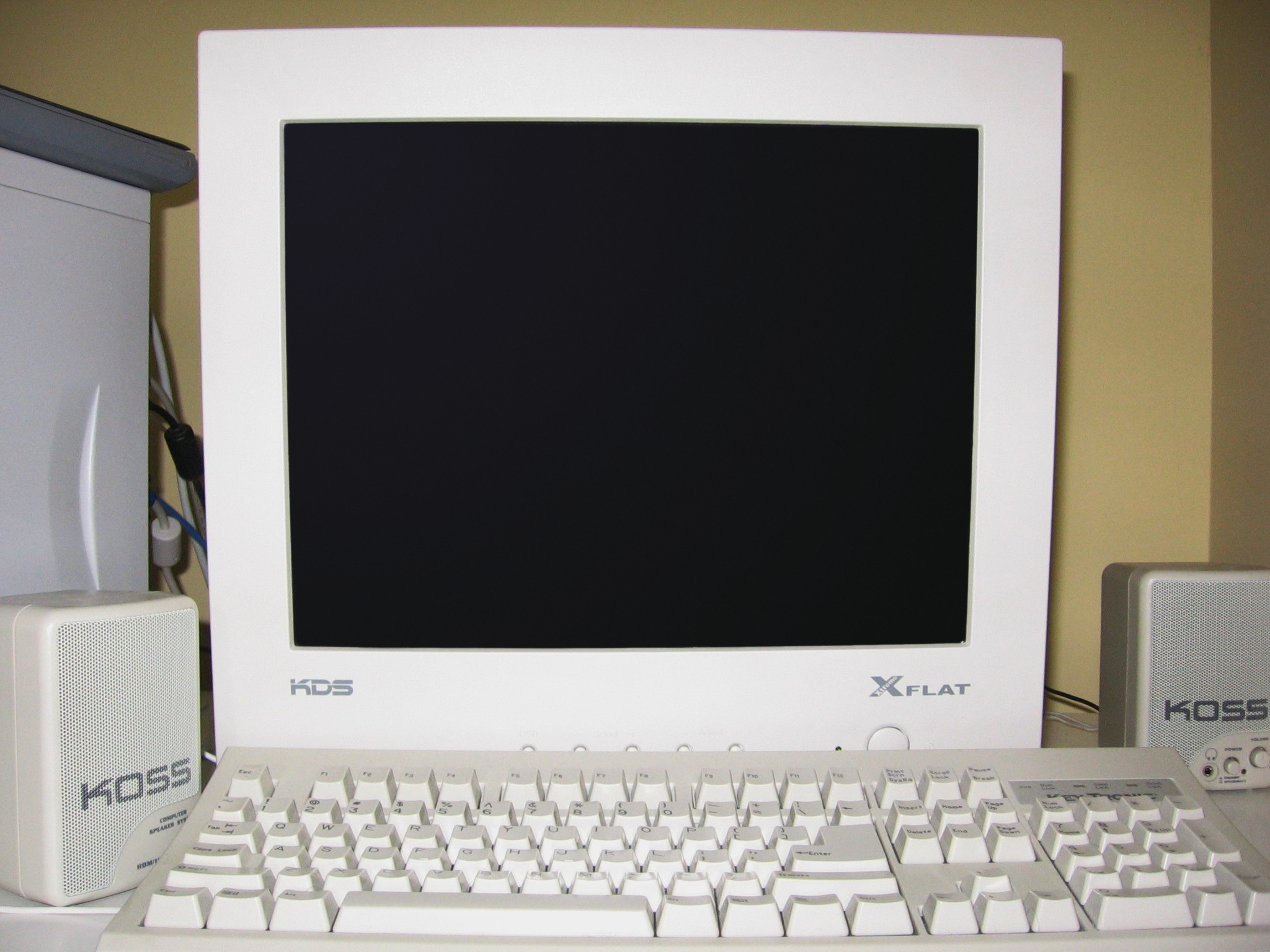
KDS-branded X-Flat monitor from c. 2003

Starting in the late 1990s, KDS began a sales effort to market monitors under its own name. In 1996, the company moved its American subsidiary, KDS USA, to an 83,000-square-foot facility in Garden Grove, California, from which the company distributed its monitors as well as conduct worldwide sales and marketing. In March 1997, by which point KDS was shipping 250,000 monitors monthly, the company released its first branded product, the Visual Sensations-21 (VS-21), a CRT monitor with a 21-inch-diagonal picture tube. In June that year, the company signed a deal with its first brick-and-mortal retail partner, CompUSA, to sell its monitors across the United States. In August 1998, KDS acquired the monitor business of Radius Inc., allowing KDS to manufacture high-end monitors for Macintosh systems. In 1999, KDS began selling monitors with Trinitron picture tubes manufactured by Sony, under the Avitron trademark.

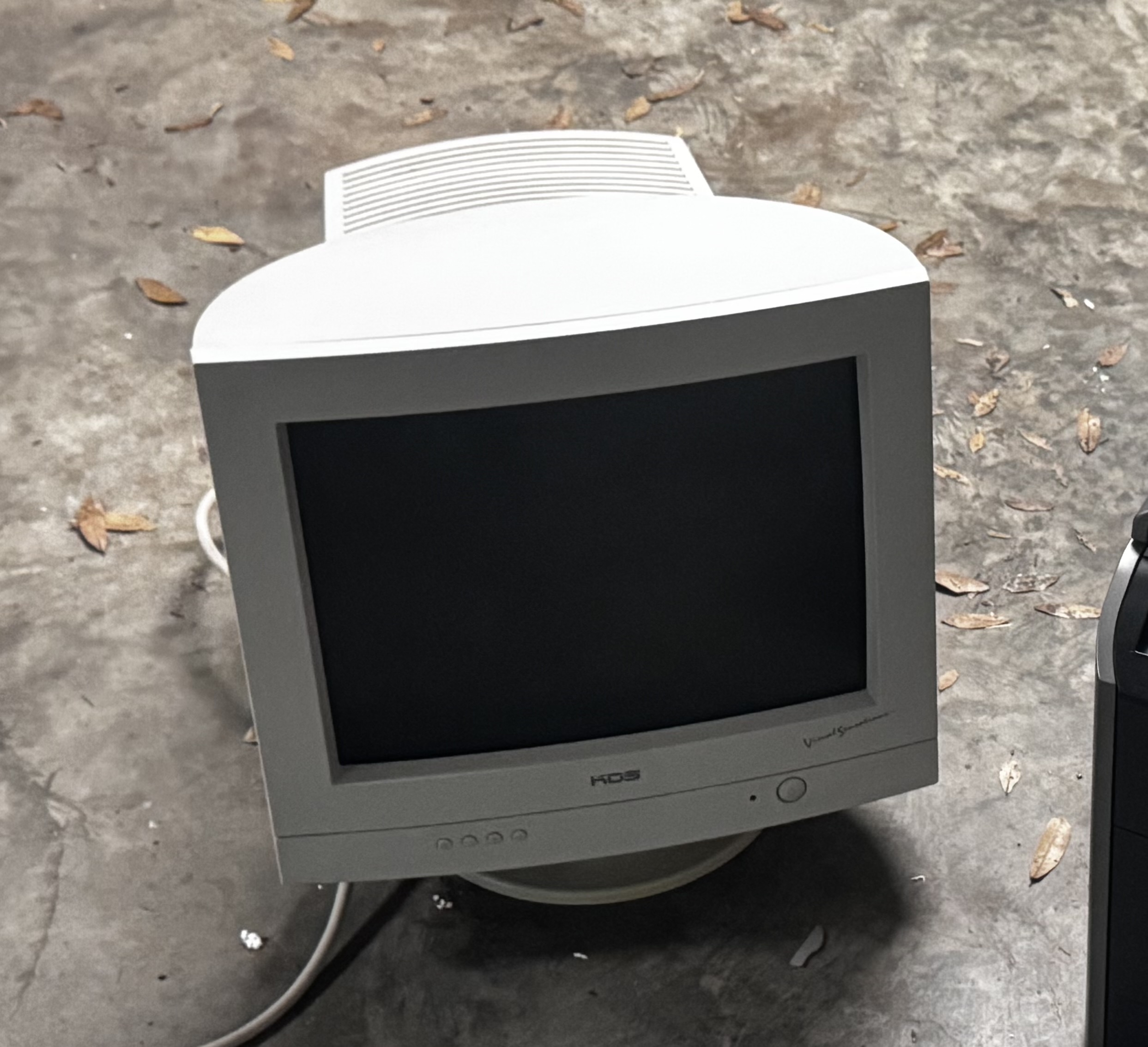
The front of a 1999 KDS Visual Sensations CRT monitor. The back informational label of the same 1999 KDS Visual Sensations CRT monitor.

In September 1998, Korea Data Systems formed an American joint venture, eMachines, with the Korean computer company TriGem and the Japanese computer ODM Sotec. The three companies established eMachines to market sub-$1000 personal computers in the United States. and Japanese computer maker Sotec. By early 1999, eMachines was the fourth-largest personal computer manufacturer in the United States. Production of eMachines' computers was largely done at TriGem's factory in Ansan, with concurrent production lines in Taiwan and Japan. Meanwhile, KDS provided the monitors for the eMachines systems. Despite its initial success, eMachines faltered in the early 2000s amid quality control concerns and a botched IPO on the Nasdaq. In 2001, KDS president Lap Shun Hui bought eMachines from his business partners and soon thereafter took it private. He eventually sold it to the American computer maker Gateway, Inc., in 2004 for an estimated $289.5 million ($30 million in cash and 50 million in shares of Gateway stock).

In November 1999, KDS USA acquired Mag Portable Technologies, a $10-million marketer of laptops based in Santa Ana, California, for an undisclosed sum. Mag was made a subsidiary of KDS and rechristened KDS Computers. Laptops under the KDS Computers brand were manufactured in East Asia. KDS Computers, as with eMachines, struggled with customer dissatisfaction and high rates of return and went defunct in 2003.

=== Receivership and acquisition (2001–2003) ===
Korea Data Systems filed for court receivership in Seoul in December 2001, after a failure to collect overseas bonds led the company to financial duress. In February 2003, Konia Technology Limited, a medium-sized Korean venture capital company specializing in display technologies, announced their intent to acquire KDS out of receivership for roughly ₩75 billion. KDS under the ownership of Konia discontinued production of CRT monitors by the mid-2000s, shifting to liquid-crystal displays (LCD), for which they contracted Proview of Hong Kong for manufacturing.
