= InFocus M810 =

Smartphone

InFocus M810 is a smartphone marketed by InFocus and manufactured by Foxconn. It was released on July 31, 2014.

== Specifications ==
The device features a 5.50-inch IPS display, with two cameras, a 13 megapixel camera in the rear and a 5 megapixel camera in the front. It has 2GB of ram and 16GB of storage by default. It runs on Android, defaulting to 4.4.2.

== Criticism ==
The Infocus M810 was marketed as a 4G capable device in India. However, it does not support the TDD-LTE 2300MHz Band 40, which is commonly used as the standard in India.

== See also ==
- InFocus Epic 1
