= TriGem =

South Korean computer manufacturer

TriGem Computer Inc.
- Native name: 삼보컴퓨터
- Industry: Computer; Electronics; Telecommunication
- Founded: 2 July 1980; 46 years ago in Seoul, South Korea
- Founder: Lee Yong-tae
- Defunct: 2010; 16 years ago
- Fate: See § Receivership
- Products: Computers; laptops
- Divisions: Averatec; TriGem Corporation; eMachines (1998–2004, joint venture); Korea Thrunet (1999–2005)
- Website: www.trigem.co.kr

Averatec

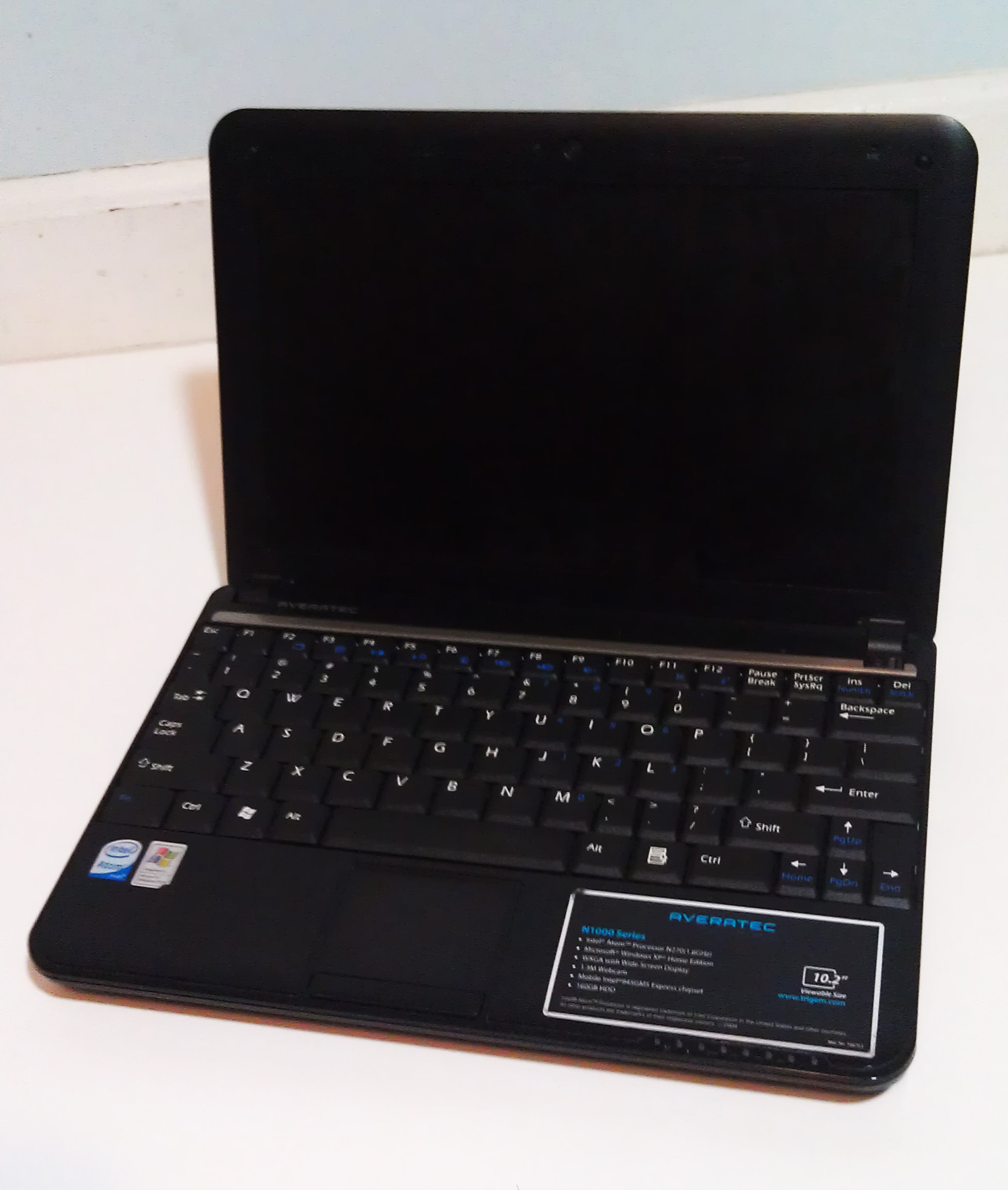
- An Averatec N1000 netbook
- Type: Subsidiary
- Founded: 2003; 23 years ago
- Defunct: 2012; 14 years ago
- Headquarters: Santa Ana, California, United States
- Parent: TriGem
- Website: www.trigem.co.kr

TriGem Computer Inc. (Korean: 삼보컴퓨터; RR: Sambo Computer, abbreviated TG, also known as TG Sambo), was a South Korean personal computer manufacturer and technology company. Established in 1980, TriGem was the first Korean company dedicated to manufacturing computer systems. It delivered Korea's first microcomputer in 1981 and the first Korean IBM PC compatibles in 1984. From that point until its breakup in 2010, it alternated between the first- and second-largest computer manufacturer in South Korea, competing with Samsung Electronics.

== History ==
=== Foundation (1980–1997) ===
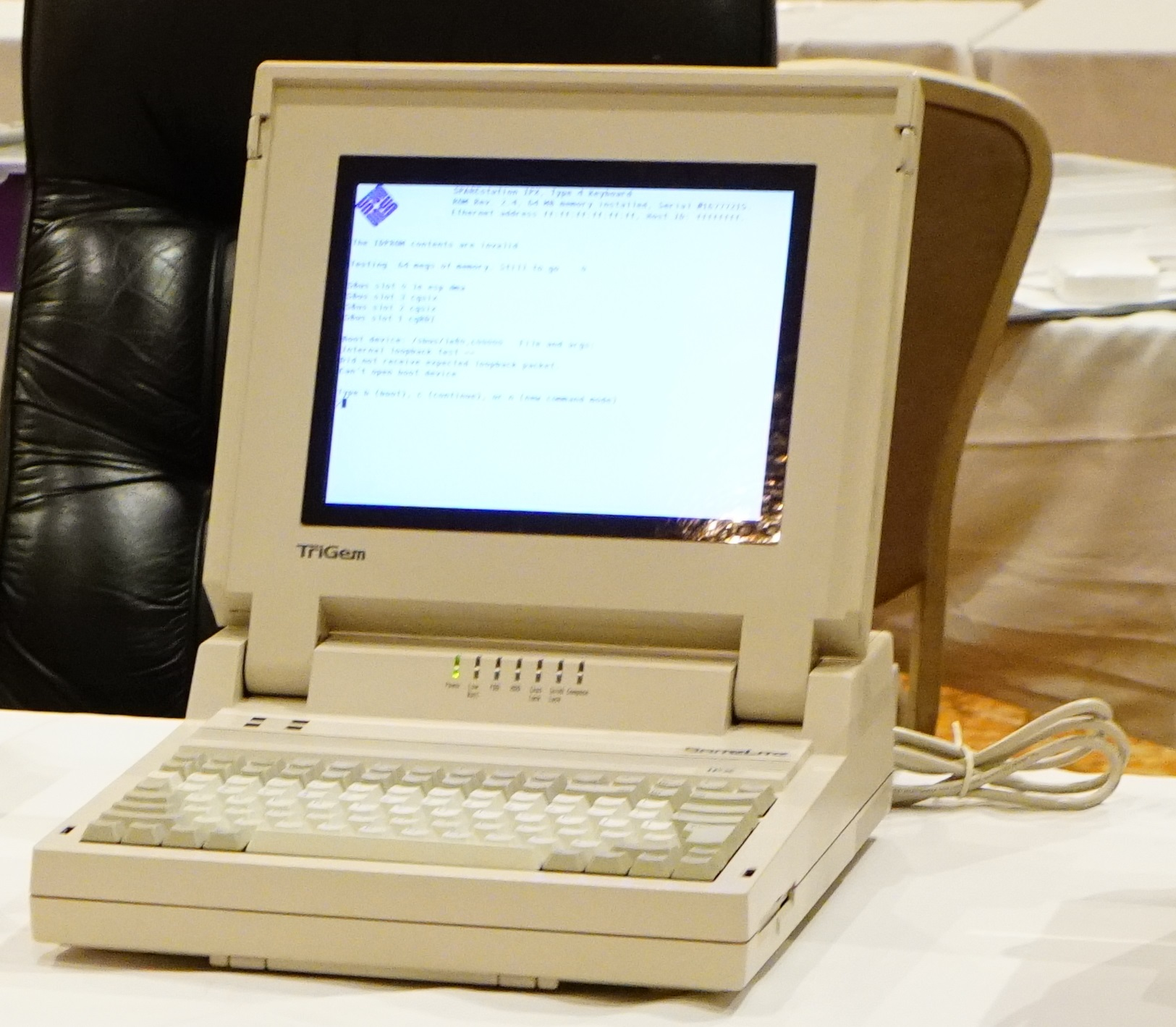
TriGem Brite Lite, SPARC-based laptop

TriGem Computer was founded in 1980 by Lee Yong-tae with ₩10,000,000 in start-up capital. TriGem was the first Korean company dedicated to manufacturing computer systems, bucking headwinds in an ecosystem of established chaebol conglomerates such as Hyundai, Lucky-Goldstar (LG), and Daewoo, which had opened divisions to manufacture computer components (such as DRAM) but reluctant about fully entering the burgeoning global microcomputer market. In 1981, TriGem delivered Korea's first microcomputer, and in 1984, they developed the country's first IBM PC–compatible personal computer. In 1982, TriGem forged a partnership with Seiko Epson of Japan, committing to build computer peripherals such as printers for the latter on an OEM basis. By 1990, TriGem cornered dot matrix printer production in Korea, with an 80-percent market share. The company began manufacturing Epson's Equity line of personal computers in 1987, after Epson had purchased a 20 percent stake in TriGem. By 1990, TriGem produced close to 500,000 computers annually; from 1987 to 1990, TriGem manufactured 300,000 computers for Epson.

TriGem's partnership with Epson winded down in the turn of the decade, after Epson announced that they would ramp up production of its computers at the company's manufacturing plant in Portland, Oregon. In 1989, TriGem Computer opened a subsidiary in the United States, amid plans to market computers under their own name in the country. Setting out to innovate in the field of personal computing, the company redirected eight percent of their gross sales into the research and development end of this subsidiary. The company planned a line of PC-compatible desktop computers, notebooks, and workstations based on the EISA and Micro Channel buses. TriGem also manufactured a SPARC-based laptop, OEMed for RDI Inc. of San Diego. This laptop, named the Brite Lite, was capable of running Unix, MS-DOS, and Classic Mac OS applications. Also in 1990, TriGem entered an OEM relationship with CMS Enhancements of Irvine, California, to manufacture computers under the CMS brand. This proved near-fatal for CMS after a price war in 1992 pulled them out of the market, with hardly any of these computers being sold.

=== Vertical growth (1997–2003) ===
By the mid-1990s TriGem was the largest manufacturer of laptops in Korea. Sales of personal computers hit a slump in 1998, with TriGem producing 1.1 million that year, down from 2 million in 1997. With a looming bankruptcy amid $600 million in losses, TriGem turned to the creation of other ventures in order to recoup profits.

The first and largest was eMachines, a maker of sub-$1000 personal computers for the American market. Established in 1998, eMachines was a joint venture between TriGem, Korea Data Systems, and Japanese computer maker Sotec. By early 1999, eMachines was the fourth-largest personal computer manufacturer in the United States. Production of eMachines' computers was largely done at TriGem's factory in Ansan, with concurrent production lines in Taiwan and Japan.

TriGem's second largest venture in the late 1990s was Korea Thrunet, a subsidiary that provided broadband Internet in Korea. It was the first Korean company listed on the Nasdaq, in 1999. Stakeholders in Thrunet included Microsoft and the KEPCO, an electric utility company run by the state of South Korea. Other TriGem ventures included Narae Mobile Telecom, a mobile carrier in Korea, and joint ventures with SoftBank Korea and Yahoo! to distribute the former two's software.

TriGem's Ansan factory produced 5.4 million laptops in 1999. Hewlett-Packard placed an order for 1 million TriGem-built laptops in early 2000.

==== Averatec ====
In 2003 TriGem launched Averatec, another American subsidiary established in Santa Ana, California, that sold only laptops. Unlike the American TriGem Computer or eMachines, Averatec operated largely independently and did not contract TriGem for the manufacture of its laptops. During TriGem's time in receivership (see below), Averatec continued to design and deliver laptops to stores. As of 2012, Averatec is no longer in operation.

=== Decline, receivership, and breakup (2003–2010) ===
In 2003, Thrunet fell into receivership amid sharp drops in revenue. It was eventually purchased by competitor Hanaro Telecom in March 2005 for ₩471.4 billion (US$460 million). TriGem's computer business suffered accordingly in the early 2000s. Although it trailed close behind Samsung and LG, margins shrank as it vied for the bottom-end of the ever-cheapening personal computer market of the early 2000s. American computer maker Gateway, Inc., purchased eMachines in 2004 for an estimated $289.5 million: $30 million in cash and 50 million in shares of Gateway stock.

In 2005, TriGem itself entered receivership after announcing bankruptcy. Although it had been the second-largest domestic computer behind Samsung to that point, its international shipments of personal computers had fallen rapidly, against a ten percent growth in global PC sales from 2004 to 2005, due to strong competition from Chinese and Taiwanese computer vendors. Also cited by insiders was a botched refocus as a consultant for the design of computer systems for outside companies (ODM), a segment in which they had failed to find many high-profile customers. In the interim, Averatec continued designing and selling laptops in the retail market. Lenovo Group, the third-largest computer company in 2006, was rumored to be in talks to purchase TriGem amid auctions of its assets in 2006. Instead the venture capital company Celrun was named as its purchaser, relaunching the company in 2007. Despite making some inroads with Staples to vend a variety of TriGem's products in 2008, TriGem again collapsed in 2010, when Celrun itself filed for receivership, seeking protection from creditors. TriGem shortly after was broken up to separate profitable units from doomed ones. The second son Lee Yong-tae purchased most of the good assets and from them established TG Computer Inc.
