= Duarte Unified School District =

School district in California, United States

The Duarte Unified School District is a school district located in Duarte, California. The district serves students from Duarte, Bradbury and the unincorporated southern portions of Duarte and Monrovia. The district is relatively small, containing only 1 elementary (K-6) school, 3 K-8 schools, 1 comprehensive high school and 1 continuation high school. The population of students served in the district is socio-economically diverse, and culturally rich.

== Governance ==
=== Superintendent's Office ===
The current superintendent for the Duarte Unified School District is Ms. Nadia Hillman who became superintendent in July 2024. She replaced Dr. Gordon Amerson who took a superintendent job in Riverside County.

=== Board of education ===
The current members of the Board of Education are:

- Reyna Diaz
- Cecilia Carroll
- Tom Reyes
- Dr. James Finlay
- Kenneth Bell

The Board of Education members are elected at-large and to a four-year term. The elections are held on a first Tuesday after the first Monday in November of even-numbered years along with the Los Angeles County, California state and federal general elections starting with the 2018 election.

== Schools ==
=== Elementary and Middle (TK-8) ===
- Beardslee Dual Immersion Academy
- Maxwell International Baccalaureate Academy
- Royal Oaks STEAM Academy
- Valley View Academy of Technology and Creative Learning (K-6)

=== High (9-12) ===
- Duarte High School
- Mount Olive Innovation & Technology High School (Alternative Education)

=== Head Start & State Preschool (4-year olds) ===
- Andres Duarte Preschool
- Beardslee Elementary
- Maxwell Academy

=== State Preschool (3-year olds) ===
- Andres Duarte Preschool

=== Alternative Education ===
- Mt. Olive Continuation High School

== Former schools ==
The district previously operated Northview Intermediate School and Andres Duarte Elementary School. In 2016, the school district administration began to consider closing schools.

== See also ==
List of school districts in Los Angeles County, California
