= InFocus Epic 1 =

Smartphone

- Manufacturer: InFocus
- Type: Smartphone
- First released: October 25, 2016; 9 years ago
- Availability by region: India October 25, 2016; 9 years ago
- Compatible networks: 2G; 3G; 4G; LTE
- Form factor: Slate
- Dimensions: 153 mm × 76 mm × 8.4 mm (6.02 in × 2.99 in × 0.33 in)
- Weight: 160 g (5.6 oz)
- Operating system: Android 6.0 "Marshmallow" with InLife UI 2.0
- System-on-chip: MT6797M
- CPU: Deca Core 1.4 GHz Helio X20
- Memory: 3 GB RAM
- Storage: 32 GB
- Removable storage: microSD, expandable up to 128 GB
- Battery: 3000 mAh (non-removable)
- Rear camera: 16 MP, PDAF, 1080p at 30 fps
- Front camera: 8 MP, f/2.0, 1080p at 30 fps
- Display: 1080x1920 1080p FHD LTPS touchscreen, 16M colors; 13.97 in (35.5 cm))
- Sound: 3.5 mm (0.14 in) jack, vibration, active noise cancellation
- Connectivity: GSM, WCDMA, LTE-FDD, TD-LTE, LTE
- Data inputs: Sensors: Light sensor; Fingerprint sensor; G-Sensor; Ir sensor; A-GPS; Accelerometer; Proximity sensor; Other: Physical sound volume keys
- Website: www.infocusindia.co.in/mobile-phones/specs-epic1.php

InFocus Epic 1 is a smartphone marketed by InFocus and manufactured by Foxconn. It was released on 25 October 2016.

== Specifications ==
- Display: 5.50-inch Full HD Display
- Processor: MT6797M Deca Core (1.4 GHz)
- Rear Camera: 16 megapixels
- Front Camera: 8 megapixels
- RAM: 3 GB
- OS: Android 6.0 Marshmallow
- Storage: 32 GB (Expandable to 128 GB)
- Battery capacity: 3000 mAh

== See also ==
- InFocus M810
