= Wayne Inouye =

American businessman

- Born: 1953 (age 72–73)
- Occupation: businessman
- Known for: CEO of Gateway Inc.

Wayne Inouye (born 1953) is an American business executive, who was Gateway's president and CEO, until his departure in February 2006.

== Biography ==
Inouye became president and CEO of privately held eMachines in 2001, where he quickly turned the company into one of the fastest-growing, most efficient PC companies in the United States. eMachines was acquired by Gateway in March 2004.

Inouye had several decades of senior executive experience, first at The Good Guys!, where he worked for nine years, and then as senior VP of computer merchandising at Best Buy, where he worked from 1995 to 2001.

He is the consumer merchandising & channel advisor of Fuhu, Inc. and executive officer of Fugoo, LLC.
