= Lap Shun Hui =

Chinese American entrepreneur (born 1955)

Lap Shun Hui (Chinese: 許立信; Cantonese Yale: Héui Laahp-seun; born 1955), also known as John Hui, is a Chinese American tech entrepreneur. He is the co-founder of PC manufacturing companies Everex and eMachines. He is also the current owner of LCD manufacturer InFocus and the former owner of PC manufacturer Packard Bell.

== Biography ==
Hui was born in Guangdong Province in southern China, and was raised in Hong Kong since he was one year old. He moved to the United States in 1973 to attend college at University at Buffalo, and later received his MBA from McMaster University in Canada.

Hui's first involvement in the tech industry began when he helped found computer manufacturer Everex in 1983. Several years later, in 1995, Hui has been president of the monitor manufacturer Korea Data Systems USA, Inc., which he used to help form tech start-up eMachines in 1998. In 2004, Hui sold eMachines to computer hardware giant Gateway, Inc. for $266 million in cash and stock. In the process, he became Gateway's second-largest shareholder. In 2006, after becoming dissatisfied with Gateway's leadership, he offered to purchase the firm for $450 million but was rebuffed. That same year, Hui purchased Packard Bell, later selling it to Acer in 2008. He then purchased Oregon-based LCD manufacturer InFocus in 2009.

== Role at Foxconn ==
Hui later served as the Chief Strategy Officer at Foxconn Technology Co., Ltd., the world's largest electronics manufacturer. During his tenure, he played a critical role in Foxconn's acquisition of Sharp Corporation. The deal, finalized in 2016, was valued at approximately $3.5 billion and marked a significant milestone in the electronics industry.

Hui and his wife Pauline Wong, a former Hong Kong film actress, have one son and reside in Bradbury, California.
