= Duarte, California =

City in California, United States

- City
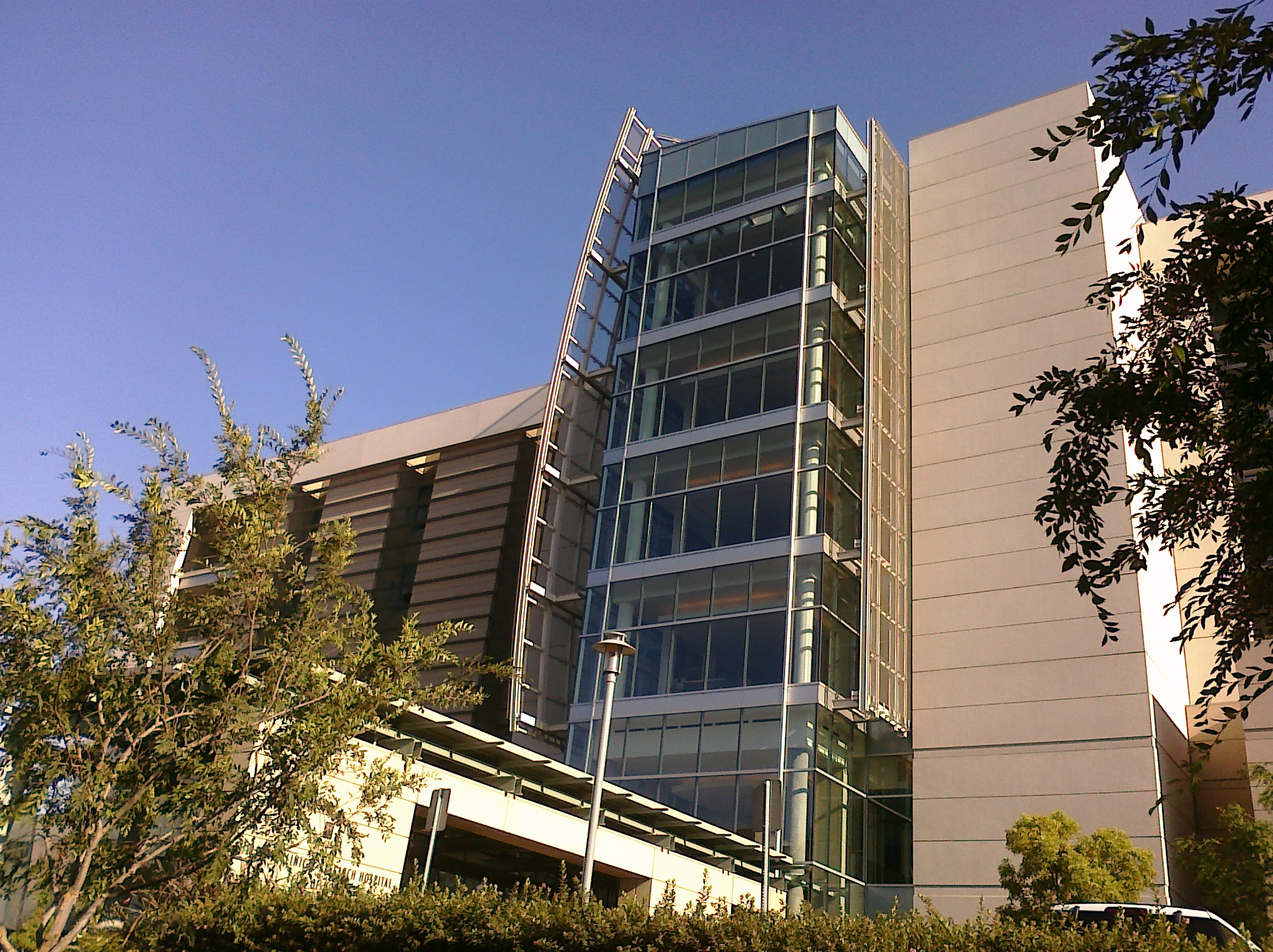
- Helford Clinical Research Hospital at the City of Hope National Medical Center

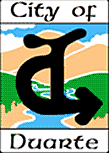
- Flag Seal
- Motto: "City of Health"
- Interactive map of Duarte, California
- Location in the United States
- Coordinates: 34°8′25″N 117°57′42″W
- Country: United States
- State: California
- County: Los Angeles
- Incorporated: August 22, 1957
- Named for: Andrés Duarte

Government
  - Type: Council-Manager
  - Mayor: Tera Martin Del Campo

Area
  - Total: 6.71 sq mi (17.38 km^{2})
  - Land: 6.71 sq mi (17.38 km^{2})
  - Water: 0 sq mi (0.00 km^{2}) 0%
- Elevation: 512 ft (156 m)

Population (2020)
  - Total: 21,727
  - Density: 3,238.5/sq mi (1,250.39/km^{2})
- Time zone: UTC-8 (Pacific)
  - Summer (DST): UTC-7 (PDT)
- ZIP codes: 91008-91010
- Area code: 626
- FIPS code: 06-19990
- GNIS feature ID: 1652699
- Website: cityofduarte.ca.gov

Duarte (/ˈdwɑːrti, duˈɑːrteɪ/) is a city in the San Gabriel Valley of Los Angeles County, California, United States. As of the 2020 census, the city population was 21,727. Duarte is located on historic U.S. Route 66, which today follows Huntington Drive through the middle of the city. It is bounded to the north by the San Gabriel Mountains, to the north and west by the cities of Bradbury and Monrovia, to the south by the city of Irwindale, and to the east by the cities of Irwindale and Azusa. The town is named after Andrés Avelino Duarte, a Californio ranchero (rancher) who founded the community on his land grant, Rancho Azusa de Duarte.

== History ==
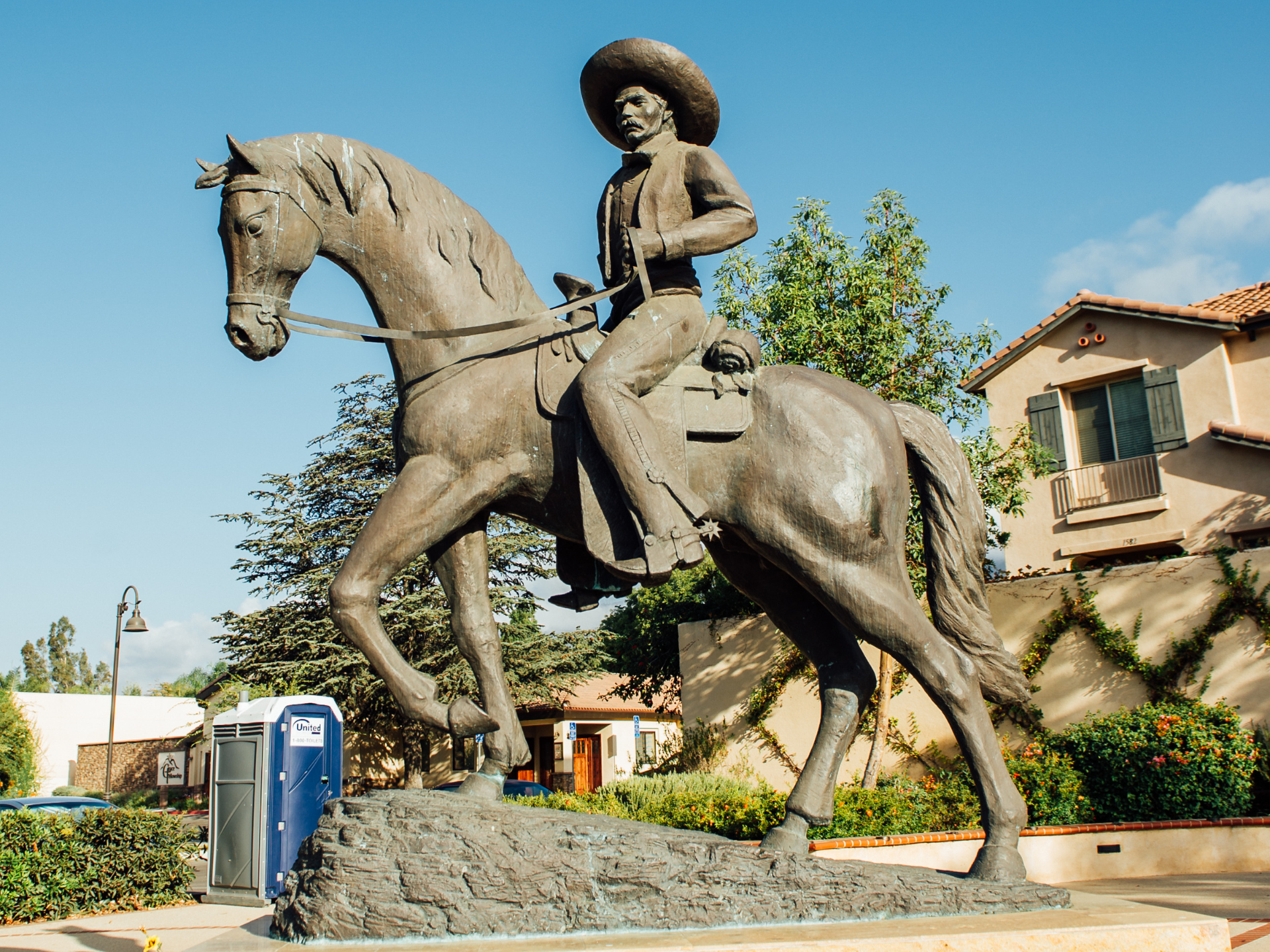
Statue of Andrés Avelino Duarte, Californio ranchero and namesake of the city of Duarte.

Around 500 B.C., a band of Shoshonean-speaking Indians established settlements in what is now the San Gabriel Valley. These Native Americans were dubbed the Gabrieliño Indians (after San Gabriel, the local mission) by early Spanish colonial explorers, but now generally prefer to be called the Tongva. Since the San Gabriel Valley area was home to large numbers of oak trees such as coast live oak and interior live oak, a staple of the Tongva diet was an acorn meal made by boiling acorn flour.

=== Spanish era ===
Duarte's history with Europeans dates back to 1769, when all land in California was claimed by the king of Spain. The first Europeans visited the San Gabriel Valley during a 1769 expedition from San Diego to Monterey Bay commanded by Don Gaspar de Portolà. Accompanying Portolà was a Franciscan priest from Junípero Serra's order in Mexico, Juan Crespí, who served as the diarist of the expedition. Much of what is known of early California is known only from the detailed descriptions recorded by Crespi.

On September 8, 1771, the Franciscans established the Mission San Gabriel Arcangel in the San Gabriel Valley. The mission was a resting point for early California travelers and gathered most of the native Tongva into an agricultural lifestyle. Following Mexican independence in 1821, the mission lands were nationalized.

=== Mexican era ===
On May 10, 1841, the governor of Alta California, Juan Bautista Alvarado, granted to former Mexican corporal Andrés Avelino Duarte and his wife nearly 7,000 acres (28 km^{2}) of prime land in the central-northern San Gabriel Valley. Duarte named his new holdings "Rancho Azusa de Duarte". The name Azusa was derived from Asuksa-gna, meaning "skunk place," the name of the Tongva settlement on the foothills of the San Gabriel Valley, on the western side of the alluvial fan where the San Gabriel River exits the San Gabriel Mountains; a portion of this area forms the northeastern-most corner of Duarte. That land grant now comprises portions of Arcadia, portions of Monrovia, all of Bradbury, all of Duarte, portions of Irwindale, portions of Azusa and a portion of Baldwin Park. Corporal Duarte had the local Indians build a small hut for his family and help him plant a kitchen garden and orchards near "the Indian Springs of the Asuksas" (in what is now Fish Canyon).

=== Post-Conquest era ===
Following the American Conquest of California, the territory was ceded by Mexico to the United States in 1848 at the end of the Mexican–American War. In 1851, Congress passed a bill that established a Board of Land Commissioners whose duty was to determine the validity of all grants of Alta California land by Spanish and Mexican authorities.

Corporal Duarte began incurring legal expenses and other debts, which he defrayed by selling portions of his Rancho. This first sale was a 225-acre (0.91 km^{2}) parcel at the southern end of the Rancho to Michael Whistler and two unidentified colleagues. Whistler later bought out his colleagues and sold the entire parcel to Dr. Nehemiah Beardslee, who started the first school in Duarte (which now bears his surname) and laid out the first section of Duarte's water lines. Corporal Duarte divided much of the Rancho's remainder into 40-acre (16 ha) plots and sold them individually. Corporal Duarte finally won a favorable ruling from the Supreme Court for his land grant case in 1878, but by then he had sold the entire Rancho.

Many of Duarte's earliest pioneer families came to Duarte in the mid-19th century for their health, the pleasant climate, and the fertile soil. English settlers, Americans from the Midwest and Deep South, Latinos who remained from the Rancho days, and Japanese immigrants enabled Duarte to grow into a thriving agricultural community specializing in citrus production. The first recorded avocado tree grown in California was planted in Duarte by William Chappelow, Sr. grown from one of four seeds sent to him by the Division of Pomology of the United States Department of Agriculture in 1893.

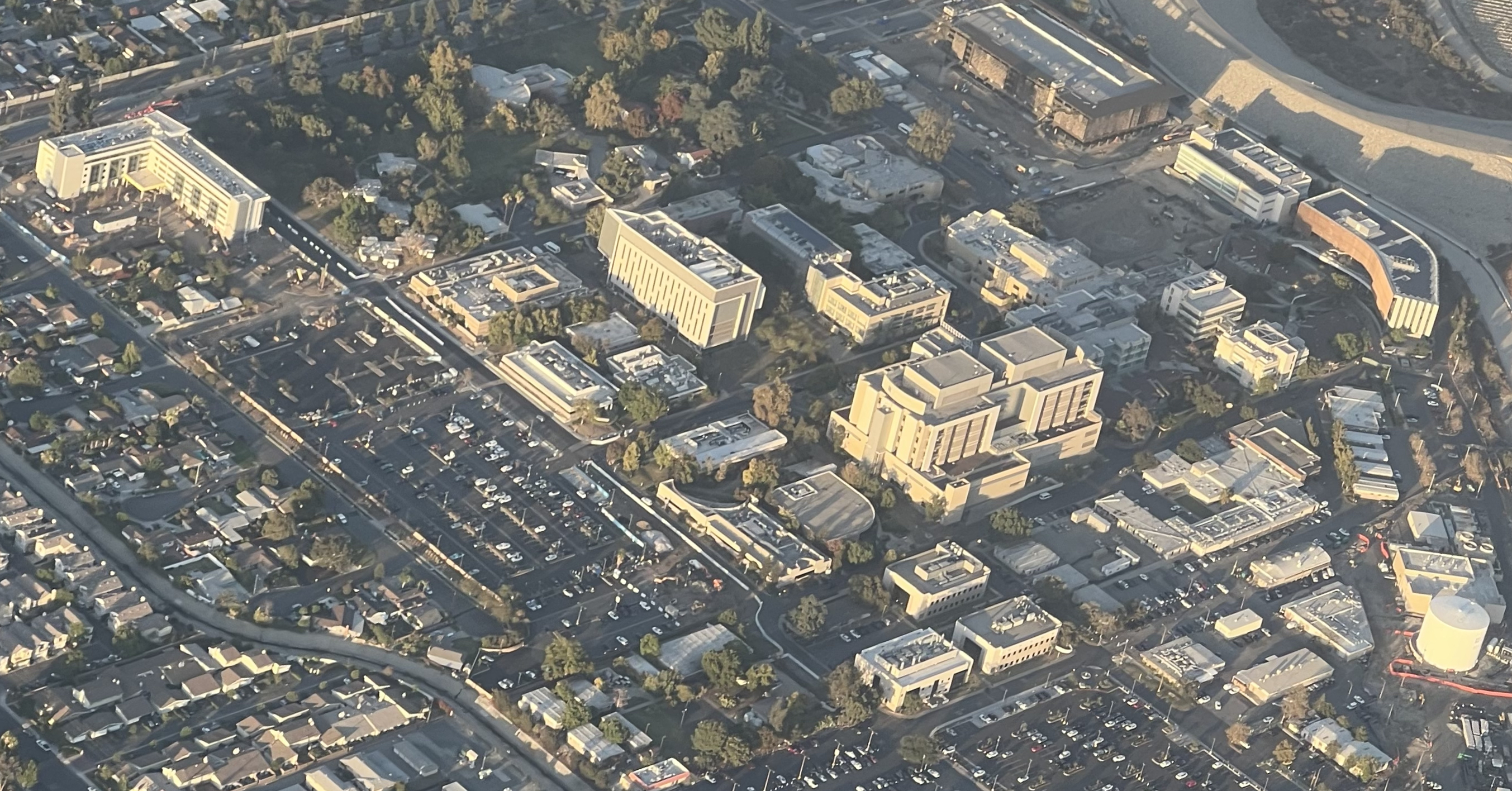
Aerial view of City of Hope campus (2021)

=== Modern era ===
Two medical institutions were started in Duarte in the early part of the 20th century. In 1913, the Jewish Consumptive Relief Association started a tuberculosis sanitarium in the form of a small tent city on 40 acres (16 ha) of land south of Duarte Road. This later evolved into the City of Hope National Medical Center. In 1930, a group of Carmelite nuns known as the Carmelite Sisters of the Most Sacred Heart of Los Angeles established what is now the Santa Teresita Rest Home, known until recently as Santa Teresita Medical Center. After decades as a full-service hospital, Santa Teresita was downgraded to "medical center" in the early 21st century, after financial problems, caused both by administrative missteps as well as the costs of providing medical coverage to the uninsured, forced the hospital to close its emergency room. Santa Teresita now operates as an "outpatient services only" facility.

In 1957, a group of community members, fearing annexation by neighboring cities, led a fight for incorporation. Indeed, parts of the original Rancho had already been annexed by neighboring Monrovia, Azusa, Irwindale, and Baldwin Park. At the same time, a rival group representing an affluent enclave in the foothills started a competing drive for incorporation and broke off to form the separate city of Bradbury. A 2001 Los Angeles Times article stated that their petition for incorporation arrived in Sacramento on August 22, 1957, "mere moments" before the petition that would have included what is now Bradbury in the city of Duarte. Still, many ties between the two communities remain in that they both form the Duarte Unified School District; they both share the same post office and the 91008 ZIP code; and they both share combined public services such as the Los Angeles County Sheriff's Department and Los Angeles County Fire Department, and garbage pickup (provided by Burrtec Waste Services).

The original city logo was created by Bill Botts Sr. in 1957. It consisted of a double-circular seal, with the inner circle containing an adobe arch featuring the Rancho Azusa de Duarte "d" brand (inside the arch is the original date of the Rancho's establishment, 1841) while the outer circle features the year of Duarte's incorporation (1957). The current city logo was created in early 1982 to mark Duarte's 25th anniversary of cityhood.

Like many of its neighbors, modern Duarte is a bedroom community. The city of Duarte is geographically isolated from population centers to the east and south due to the San Gabriel River and rock quarry operations in Irwindale and Azusa. To the north, the San Gabriel Mountains, including areas in the San Gabriel Mountains National Monument remain closed to development or habitation. These factors have proven to be an ongoing economic challenge for local businesses as the city attracts little outside spending, and most residents spend their money elsewhere. Due to air quality and noise concerns, the city of Duarte has sought repeatedly to halt the expansion of neighboring quarry operations but has had no success against the monied interests behind the quarries and the neighboring city governments beholden to them. Still, over the past few decades, the city leadership has succeeded in bringing retail development to the western portion of Duarte.

In September 2010, Forbes magazine placed the ZIP code of 91008 at #1 on its annual list of America's most expensive ZIP codes, containing the parts of Duarte immediately north of neighboring Bradbury.

== Geography ==
According to the United States Census Bureau, the city has a total area of 6.7 square miles (17 km^{2}), all land.

== Demographics ==
Historical population
Census	Pop.	Note	%±
1960	13,962		—
1970	14,981		7.3%
1980	16,766		11.9%
1990	20,688		23.4%
2000	21,486		3.9%
2010	21,321		−0.8%
2020	21,727		1.9%
U.S. Decennial Census; 1860–1870 1880-1890; 1900 1910 1920; 1930 1940 1950; 1960 1970 1980; 1990 2000 2010; 2020

Duarte first appeared as a city in the 1960 U.S. census.

=== Racial and ethnic composition ===
Duarte city, California – Racial and ethnic composition Note: the US Census treats Hispanic/Latino as an ethnic category. This table excludes Latinos from the racial categories and assigns them to a separate category. Hispanics/Latinos may be of any race.
Race / Ethnicity (NH = Non-Hispanic)	Pop 1980	Pop 1990	Pop 2000	Pop 2010	Pop 2020	% 1980	% 1990	% 2000	% 2010	% 2020
White alone (NH)	9,430	9,380	6,895	5,729	4,892	56.39%	45.34%	32.09%	26.87%	22.52%
Black or African American alone (NH)	1,495	1,766	1,894	1,486	1,126	8.94%	8.54%	8.82%	6.97%	5.18%
Native American or Alaska Native alone (NH)	63	76	94	63	59	0.38%	0.37%	0.44%	0.30%	0.27%
Asian alone (NH)	669	2,268	2,669	3,287	4,507	4.00%	10.96%	12.42%	15.42%	20.74%
Native Hawaiian or Pacific Islander alone (NH)	669	2,268	18	24	15	4.00%	10.96%	0.08%	0.11%	0.07%
Other race alone (NH)	23	38	49	60	101	0.14%	0.18%	0.23%	0.28%	0.46%
Mixed race or Multiracial (NH)	x	x	541	482	591	x	x	2.52%	2.26%	2.72%
Hispanic or Latino (any race)	5,044	7,160	9,326	10,190	10,436	30.16%	34.61%	43.41%	47.79%	48.03%
Total	16,724	20,688	21,486	21,321	21,727	100.00%	100.00%	100.00%	100.00%	100.00%

=== 2020 census ===
As of the 2020 census, Duarte had a population of 21,727. The population density was 3,186.8 inhabitants per square mile (1,230.4/km^{2}).

The median age was 44.3 years. 17.7% of residents were under the age of 18 and 21.9% were 65 years of age or older. For every 100 females, there were 88.0 males, and for every 100 females age 18 and over there were 84.8 males.

There were 7,377 households, with an average household size of 2.98. Of all households, 30.8% had children under the age of 18, 47.9% were married-couple households, 15.5% had a male householder with no spouse or partner present, and 31.3% had a female householder with no spouse or partner present. About 24.4% of households were made up of individuals, and 14.2% had someone living alone who was 65 years of age or older.

There were 7,666 housing units, of which 3.8% were vacant. The homeowner vacancy rate was 0.4% and the rental vacancy rate was 5.0%. The Census reported that 63.1% of the population lived in owner-occupied housing.

99.9% of residents lived in urban areas, while 0.1% lived in rural areas.

=== Income and poverty ===
According to U.S. Census Bureau QuickFacts data, Duarte had a median household income of $75,083, with 10.2% of the population living below the federal poverty line.

=== 2010 census ===
The 2010 United States census reported that Duarte had a population of 21,321. The population density was 3,186.8 inhabitants per square mile (1,230.4/km^{2}). The racial makeup of Duarte was 11,076 (51.9%) White (26.9% Non-Hispanic White), 1,587 (7.4%) African American, 179 (0.8%) Native American, 3,361 (15.8%) Asian, 26 (0.1%) Pacific Islander, 4,108 (19.3%) from other races, and 984 (4.6%) from two or more races. Hispanic or Latino of any race were 10,190 persons (47.8%).

The Census reported that 20,914 people (98.1% of the population) lived in households, 19 (0.1%) lived in non-institutionalized group quarters, and 388 (1.8%) were institutionalized.

There were 7,013 households, out of which 2,458 (35.0%) had children under the age of 18 living in them, 3,597 (51.3%) were opposite-sex married couples living together, 1,004 (14.3%) had a female householder with no husband present, 363 (5.2%) had a male householder with no wife present. There were 285 (4.1%) unmarried opposite-sex partnerships, and 66 (0.9%) same-sex married couples or partnerships. 1,666 households (23.8%) were made up of individuals, and 888 (12.7%) had someone living alone who was 65 years of age or older. The average household size was 2.98. There were 4,964 families (70.8% of all households); the average family size was 3.54.

The population was spread out, with 4,737 people (22.2%) under the age of 18, 1,863 people (8.7%) aged 18 to 24, 5,567 people (26.1%) aged 25 to 44, 5,776 people (27.1%) aged 45 to 64, and 3,378 people (15.8%) who were 65 years of age or older. The median age was 39.9 years. For every 100 females, there were 89.6 males. For every 100 females age 18 and over, there were 85.8 males.

There were 7,254 housing units at an average density of 1,084.3 per square mile (418.7/km^{2}), of which 4,703 (67.1%) were owner-occupied, and 2,310 (32.9%) were occupied by renters. The homeowner vacancy rate was 1.1%; the rental vacancy rate was 4.4%. 14,796 people (69.4% of the population) lived in owner-occupied housing units and 6,118 people (28.7%) lived in rental housing units.

According to the 2010 United States census, Duarte had a median household income of $62,250, with 13.4% of the population living below the federal poverty line.

=== Mapping L.A. ===
According to Mapping L.A., in 2000, Mexican (31.6%) and Filipino (6.6%) were the most common ancestries. Mexico (44.1%) and the Philippines (15.7%) were the most common foreign places of birth.

== Government ==
In the United States House of Representatives, Duarte is in California's 31st congressional district, represented by Democrat Gil Cisneros.

Duarte has a council-manager government with a city council whose seven members are directly elected by residents. As of 2025, the current mayor is Bryan Urias.

United States presidential election results for Duarte, California
Year	Republican		Democratic		Third party(ies)	
Year	No.	%	No.	%	No.	%
2000	2,046	35.79%	3,435	60.08%	236	4.13%
2004	3,150	40.44%	4,529	58.15%	110	1.41%
2008	2,785	33.35%	5,374	64.35%	192	2.30%
2012	2,575	32.18%	5,206	65.07%	220	2.75%
2016	2,341	27.63%	5,670	66.91%	463	5.46%
2020	3,238	31.00%	7,005	67.07%	202	1.93%
2024	3,402	35.52%	5,857	61.16%	318	3.32%

== Education ==
The Duarte Unified School District serves students from Duarte, Bradbury, and unincorporated communities to the south of Duarte and Monrovia. The district contains four elementary schools (Maxwell, Beardslee, Royal Oaks, and Valley View), one high school (Duarte High School) and one continuation high school (Mt. Olive Continuation High School, since renamed to the "Mt. Olive Institute of Technology" as of June 2013), CSArts-SGV (California School of Arts-San Gabriel Valley) as of 2018.

Within Duarte, there are also five licensed private schools. Foothill Oaks Academy is a non-sectarian school serving students from preschool through 7th grade (since 4 September 2024.)The Duarte Montessori School is affiliated with the American Montessori Society and serves students from preschool through 2nd grade. The School of the Little Scholar is a non-sectarian preschool. ABC School is another non-sectarian preschool that focuses on children with special education needs. The Hayden Child Care Center is a Roman Catholic-affiliated school serving students in preschool and kindergarten.

== Media ==
Duarte community news is provided by the San Gabriel Valley Tribune and Duarte Dispatch, which is a weekly community newspaper published by Beacon Media News.

== Infrastructure ==
The Los Angeles County Department of Health Services operates the Monrovia Health Center in Monrovia, serving Duarte.

Since 2016, Duarte has been served by Los Angeles County Metropolitan Transportation Authority's A Line light rail at the Duarte/City of Hope station.

=== Public safety ===
The Los Angeles County Sheriff's Department (LASD) operates the Temple Station in Temple City, serving not only Duarte, but also neighboring Bradbury, while fire protection services are provided by the Los Angeles County Fire Department through Station 44 (paramedic services are provided by nearby Stations 29 in Baldwin Park and 32 in Azusa).

Duarte also has its own in-house "Department of Public Safety", where its officers (separate from the LASD) are assigned mainly with issuing citations for various violation of the city's Municipal Code, as well as issuance of dog licenses and bicycle permits.

== Notable people ==
- David Henry Breaux – activist.
- T. K. Carter - actor
- Bill Melton – Major League Baseball player for the Chicago White Sox, Cleveland Indians, and Los Angeles Angels, 1971 American League home run champion, television sports commentator.
- Glenn Miller – big band conductor, arranger, composer, trombone player, and recording artist.
- Sam Shepard – playwright, writer and actor.
- William A. Spinks – Billiards champion, co-inventor of modern billiard cue chalk, oilman, horticulturist (the Spinks Avocado cultivar developed in Duarte was considered the best commercial variety before the Haas was developed).
- Cary-Hiroyuki Tagawa – actor.

== See also ==
- Ranchos of California
- Spanish missions in California
