= EMachines =

Defunct brand of low-end PCs

eMachines
- Product type: Personal computers
- Current owner: Acer Inc. (2007–2013)
- Country: United States
- Introduced: September 1998; 28 years ago
- Discontinued: January 17, 2013; 13 years ago
- Previous owners: Gateway, Inc. (2004-2007)
- Website: emachines.com at the Wayback Machine (archived February 8, 2005)
- Founder: Lap Shun Hui

eMachines was a brand of economical personal computers. In 2004, it was acquired by Gateway, Inc., which was in turn acquired by Acer Inc. in 2007. The eMachines brand was discontinued in 2013.

== History ==
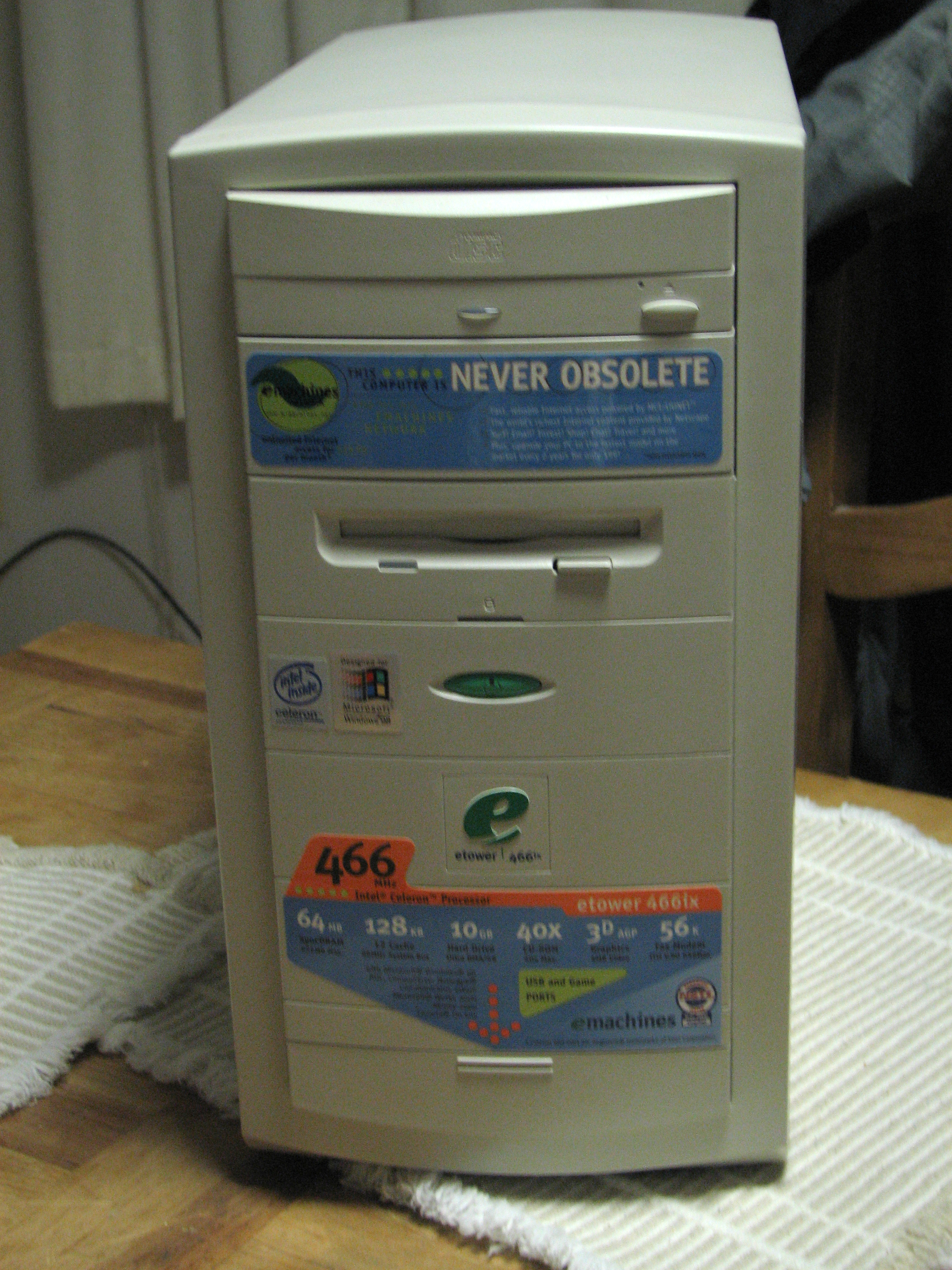
eTower

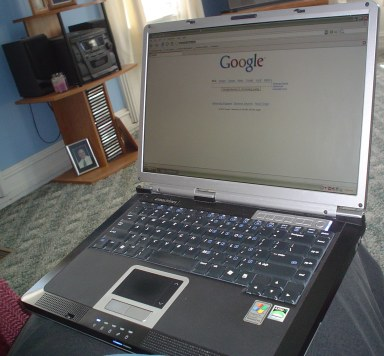
M5405 laptop

eMachines was founded in September 1998 by Lap Shun Hui as a joint venture of South Korean companies Korea Data Systems and TriGem. The company's first computers, the eTower 266 and 300, were sold at $399 or $499 respectively, not including a monitor.

By March 1999, the company was ranked fourth in U.S. computer sales, with a 9.9% market share.

In August 1999, the company released the eOne, a computer that resembled the iMac, priced at $799, with a $400 rebate for customers who signed a 3-year agreement with CompuServe.

In September 1999, the company announced plans to launch an internet service provider.

The business acquired Free-PC in November 1999, which had previously provided free computers in exchange for advertising.

On March 24, 2000, near the peak of the dot-com bubble, the company became a public company via an initial public offering, raising $180 million. By that time, the company had sold 2 million computers, but had lost $84.5 million in the previous year on $815 million in sales and a 4% profit margin. Shares fell 8% in their debut. At that time, major shareholders included AOL with a 6.4% stake and Bill T. Gross with a 12.4% stake.

By May 2001, the stock was trading at 38 cents per share and the company was delisted from the NASDAQ.

In January 2002, Lap Shun Hui acquired the company for $161 million.

In December 2003, the company released the T6000 desktop, the world's first mass-marketed AMD Athlon 64-based system, retailing at US$1,299. The systems were primarily sold through Best Buy stores, but the PCs were also available online.

In January 2004, the company released the M6805 & M6807 notebooks, the first notebook computers based on the AMD Mobile Athlon 64 processor.

In March 2004, the company was acquired by Gateway Inc. for 50 million shares of Gateway common stock and $30 million cash. Wayne Inouye, CEO of eMachines, became CEO of Gateway, with founder Ted Waitt stepping down.

In October 2007, Acer Inc. acquired Gateway.

On January 17, 2013, the eMachines brand was discontinued.
