= Trade dress =

Characteristics of visual appearance of a product

Trade dress is the characteristics of the visual appearance of a product or its packaging (or even the design of a building) that signify the source of the product to consumers. Trade dress is an aspect of trademark law, which is a form of intellectual property protection law.

== Overview ==
Trade dress is an extension of trademark protection to "[t]he design and shape of the materials in which a product is packaged, [primarily]. 'Product configuration,' the design and shape of the product itself, may also be considered a form of trade dress."

Product configuration applies particularly to situations where the product can be seen within the packaging (e.g. a toy car sold in packaging that operates as a shadow box for commercial display within—the collective look it creates is trade dress), or where the packaging is part of the product (e.g. the bottle of a soft drink, along with its visible contents, are trade dress, though the bottle is actually part of the product that retains its value to the consumer for as long as its contents last).

Like all intellectual property law other than patent law, trade dress and other trademark elements are subject to the bar on functional features (e.g. a handle cannot be protected, though it may contain trade dress features that can prevent exact replicas of a particular trade dress handle). It is a question of which elements of the packaging are intrinsic to the basic function of the packaging.

In the United States, the Lanham Act protects trade dress if it serves the same source-identifying function as a trademark. It is possible to register trade dress as a trademark, but for practical reasons most trade dress and product configurations are protected without registration under 15 U.S.C. § 1125(a).

== By country ==
=== United Kingdom ===
Trade dress can be protected as getup under the law of passing off in the UK. Passing off is a common law remedy for protecting an unregistered trademark. Getup, packaging, business strategy, marketing techniques, advertisement themes etc. can also be protected under passing off.

=== United States ===
Trade dress protection is intended to protect consumers from packaging or appearance of products that are designed to imitate other products, in order to prevent a consumer from buying one product under the belief that it is another. For example, the shape, color, and arrangement of the materials of a children's line of clothing can be protectable trade dress (though, the design of the garments themselves is not protected), as can the design of a magazine cover, the appearance and décor of a chain of Mexican-style restaurants, and a method of displaying wine bottles in a wine shop.

==== Statutory source ====
Trademark law is not explicitly mentioned in the Constitution of the United States (as opposed to patent and copyright protection law); as such, trademark law—and thus, trade dress—is enforced on the state level in addition to the federal level.

In the U.S., like trademarks, a product's trade dress is legally protected by the Lanham Act, the federal statute which regulates trademarks and trade dress. Under section 43(a) of the Lanham Act, a product's trade dress can be protected without formal registration with the United States Patent and Trademark Office (USPTO). In part, section 43(a) states the following:

Any person who, on or in connection with any goods or services, or any container for goods, uses in commerce any word, term, name, symbol, or device, or any combination thereof, or any false designation of origin, false or misleading description of fact, or false or misleading representation of fact, which

- (A) is likely to cause confusion, or to cause mistake, or to deceive ... as to the origin, sponsorship, or approval of his or her goods, services, or commercial activities by another person, or
- (B) in commercial advertising or promotion, misrepresents the nature, characteristics, qualities, or geographic origin of his or her or another person's goods, services, or commercial activities,

shall be liable in a civil action by any person who believes that he or she is likely to be damaged by such an act.

This statute allows the owner of a particular trade dress ("container for goods") to sue an infringer (a person or entity who illegally copies that trade dress) for violating section 43(a) without registering that trade dress with any formal agency or system (unlike the registration and application requirements for enforcing other forms of intellectual property, such as patents). It is commonly seen as providing "federal common law" protection for trade dress (and trademarks).

==== Formal registration ====
Trade dress may be registered with the PTO in either the Principal Register or the Supplemental Register. Although registration is not required for legal protection, registration offers several advantages. In the Principal Register, a registrant gains nationwide constructive use and constructive notice, which prevent others from using or registering that registrant's trade dress (without contesting the registration). Further, a registrant in the Principal Register gains incontestable status after five years, which eliminates many of the ways for another party to challenge the registration. Registration under the Supplemental Register allows the registrant to protect its trade dress in foreign countries, although the protections are much more limited than protections under the Principal Register in the U.S.

==== Legal requirements ====
It can be difficult to obtain protection for trade dress, as applicants must prove that the design has secondary meaning to consumers and is then further limited by the functionality doctrine.

===== Functionality =====
To gain registration in the Principal Register or common law protection under the Lanham Act, a trade dress must not be "functional". That is, the configuration of shapes, designs, colors, or materials that make up the trade dress in question must not serve a utility or function outside of creating recognition in the consumer's mind. For example, even though consumers associated a distinct spring design for wind resistant road signs with a particular company, the spring design was not protectable for trade dress purposes because the springs served the function of withstanding heavy wind conditions.

What is considered "functional" depends upon the specific product or thing sought to be protected. For example, the color red in a line of clothing may not be functional (and thus part of protectable trade dress) whereas the same color on a stop sign would be functional because the color red serves the function of putting drivers on alert (and thus would not be part of a protectable trade dress).

===== Distinctiveness =====
To gain registration in the Principal Register or common law protection under the Lanham Act, a trade dress must be "distinctive." This means that consumers perceive a particular trade dress as identifying a source of a product.

Claimed trade dress in the product design—as opposed to product packaging—context can no longer be "inherently distinctive"; it must acquire distinctiveness through "secondary meaning". Distinctiveness through secondary meaning means that although a trade dress is not distinctive on its face, the use of the trade dress in the market (the "goodwill" of the trade dress) has created an association between that trade dress and a source in the mind of the consumer.

Although the law is evolving, as it stands now, product packaging (including packaging in very general terms, such as a building's décor) may be inherently distinctive. However, product design, that is the design or shape of the product itself, may not be inherently distinctive, and must acquire secondary meaning.

==== Protection for electronic interfaces and websites ====
Although the exact boundaries of protection are still uncertain, courts are beginning to allow trade dress protection for the overall "look and feel" of a website. In Blue Nile, Inc. v. Ice.com, Inc., the plaintiff sued the defendant in the United States District Court for the Western District of Washington for copying the overall "look and feel" of plaintiff's retail jewelry websites, including the design of plaintiff's search pages. Although the court ordered more factual development before it could rule definitively on the issue, the court did hold that it was possible for the look and feel of the websites to have trade dress protection if the plaintiff's copyright claims did not already cover those parts. In SG Services, Inc. v. God's Girls, Inc., the United States District Court for the District of Oregon denied trade dress protection for the plaintiff's website because the plaintiff did not demonstrate that the website was non-functional or distinctive. This case shows the court's willingness to consider trade dress protection for a website, even though the court did not find protection in this case. However, the SG Services court did not look at the overall "look and feel" of the website, but rather, at specific characteristics (such as color) of the website that the plaintiff claimed were infringed.

Although the future of trade dress protection for websites is still very unclear, much thought has been given to this area and it will likely continue to be actively developing area for courts and litigants.

== Similar concepts in other countries ==
=== China ===
Although Chinese law does not recognize a concept of trade dress, the Anti-Unfair Competition Law (反不正当竞争法) does protect the packaging, decoration, or appearance of a "well-known commodity"; this provision accomplishes something similar to trade dress protections.

== See also ==
- Fashion design copyright
- Geschmacksmuster
- Trademark infringement
