= Hard Rock Cafe Licensing Corp. v. Concession Services, Inc. =

American court case

- Court: United States Court of Appeals for the Seventh Circuit
- Full case name: Hard Rock Cafe Licensing Corp. v. Concession Services, Inc.
- Argued: September 17, 1991
- Decided: February 4, 1992
- Citation: 955 F.2d 1143

Court membership
- Judges sitting: Richard Dickson Cudahy, Daniel Anthony Manion, John W. Reynolds (E.D. Wis.)

Case opinions
- Majority: Cudahy, joined by a unanimous court

Laws applied
- Lanham Act, 15 U.S.C. § 1051 et seq.

Hard Rock Cafe Licensing Corp. v. Concession Services, Inc., 955 F.2d 1143 (7th Cir. 1992), is a case from the Seventh Circuit Court of Appeals, which extended contributory liability to the context of flea market operators. Finding no distinction between the responsibilities of a landlord-owner and a manufacturer-distributor, the Court applied the Inwood test, holding Concession Services liable for "willful blindness" where they had knowledge that counterfeit Hard Rock Cafe merchandise was being sold at their market and did nothing to "detect or prevent" such sales.
