= Dervaes =

Dervaes is a surname. Notable people with the surname include:

- Joseph Dervaes (1906–1986), Belgian racing cyclist
- Jules Dervaes (1947–2016), American urban farmer
