= Urban homesteading =

Urban homesteading can refer to several different things: programs by local, state, and federal agencies in the United States who work to help get people into city homes, squatting, practicing urban agriculture, or practicing sustainable living techniques.

== Urban homesteading and affordable housing ==
Urban American cities, such as New York City, have used policies of urban homesteading to encourage citizens to occupy and rebuild vacant properties. Policies by the U.S Department of Housing and Urban Development allowed for federally owned properties to be sold to homesteaders for nominal sums as low as $1, financed otherwise by the state, and inspected after a one-year period. Homesteading is practiced in Detroit, but as of 2013 zoning laws prohibit such activity despite talk to encourage more urban agriculture and combat the shrinking population.

While such policies have provided affordable housing for homeowners entering an area, homesteading has been linked with gentrification since the 1970s, especially in neighborhoods such as the Lower East Side of New York City.

== Urban homesteading and agriculture ==
According to UC-Davis, "an urban homestead is a household that produces a significant part of the food, including produce and livestock, consumed by its residents. This is typically associated with residents’ desire to live in a more environmentally conscious manner."

Aspects of urban homesteading include

- Resource reduction: using solar/alternative energy sources, harvesting rainwater, using greywater, line drying clothes, using alternative transportation such as bicycles and buses
- Raising animals, including chickens, goats, rabbits, fish, worms, and/or bees
- Edible landscaping: growing fruit, vegetables, culinary and medicinal plants, converting lawns into gardens
- Self-sufficient living: re-using, repairing, and recycling items; homemade products
- Food preservation including canning, drying, freezing, cheese-making, and fermenting
- Community food-sourcing such as foraging, gleaning, and trading
- Natural building
- Composting

Urban homesteading practices can conflict with current city zoning regulations and homeowner’s association by-laws.

Urban homesteading is associated with urban agriculture. Urban Homesteading can also be referred to as Backyard Homesteading and Hobby Farming.

== History of urban homesteading ==
The concept of urban homesteading is rooted in the settlement of the western United States during the nineteenth century, when the federal government offered land as an incentive for people to develop unchartered land. Having an allotment or vegetable garden has been common throughout history, notably, victory gardens during the WW1 and WWII eras, immigrant gardens, the Integral Urban House, and the inner-city community gardening movement in the 1970s. The "back-to-the-land" movement of the 1960s, exemplified by numerous groups such as Tennessee's The Farm, has recently been reformed into a "back-to-the-city" movement.

A wealth of urban homesteading books (Urban Homestead by Kelly Coyne, Erik Knutzen; The Backyard Homestead by Carleen Madigan; Urban Homesteading by Rachel Kaplan, K. Ruby Blume; Toolbox for Sustainable City Living by Scott Kellog) have been published in the past decade. All over the world, people have found ways of growing their own food in inner-city urban areas.

On the rise are Urban Homesteading blogs from homesteads all over the world that are embracing the tenets of homesteading philosophy Urban Family Homesteader, Urban Homestead, and Urban Homesteading. These blogs chronicle the journeys of people and families who strive to get off the grid by growing their own foods, raising livestock, using solar power, and working to reduce their impact on the environment.

== Trademark controversy ==
In 2007, the Dervaes Institute applied to the U.S. Patent and Trademark Office to register the phrase "urban homesteading" as a service mark. In 2008, the institute followed up with a second service mark application, for the phrase "urban homestead". "Urban homesteading" was registered, but only on the Supplemental Register, on June 2, 2009. "Urban homestead" was registered on the Principal Register on October 5, 2010.

In February 2011, a controversy arose concerning a letter the Dervaes Institute sent to authors, bloggers, and organizations using the term "urban homesteading" in which they were asked to not use the terms "urban homestead" or "urban homesteading" without permission or attribution. On February 14–15, 2011, the Dervaes were successful in their attempts to disable several Facebook pages using the term. This caused outrage in the urban homesteading community and a backlash against the Dervaeses. Three of the entities whose pages were disabled, including authors Erik Knutzen and Kelly Coyne, Process Media and Denver Urban Homesteading filed petitions to cancel the Dervaes Institute's trademarks in the US Patent and Trademark Office in April 2011.

On 21 February 2011, Corynne McSherry, Intellectual Property Director of the Electronic Frontier Foundation (which is representing authors Coyne and Knutzen and publisher Process Media), sent a response to the Dervaes Institute and published the letter on the EFF website.

On 4 April 2011, the Electronic Frontier Foundation filed a Petition to Cancel the trademark on "urban homestead".

On 7 April 2011, Denver Urban Homesteading filed a Petition to Cancel the trademark on "urban homesteading".

On 10 April 2013, Denver Urban Homesteading filed a lawsuit in the U.S. District Court for Colorado against Dervaes Institute, Jules Dervaes and Mignon Rubio Dervaes seeking to cancel the trademark "urban homesteading," an injunction to restore its Facebook page, and damages. On 28 February 2014, the lawsuit was thrown out based on lack of personal jurisdiction and some Colorado statute of limitations. In December 2014 a lawsuit against Jules Dervaes, Dervaes Institute and Mignon Rubio Dervaes was filed in California.

On 4 November 2015, a federal court in California cancelled the trademark for “urban homesteading,” which its owner had used to disable a number of Facebook pages in 2011 by claiming infringement. This ended a nearly five-year legal struggle by a small farmers’ market in Denver, Colorado named Denver Urban Homesteading to cancel the trademark which began when the farmers lost their Facebook page and contacts with customers in February 2011.

The urban homesteading trademark was cancelled by the federal court in Denver on November 5, 2015.

The trademark was owned by the Dervaes Institute of Pasadena, CA, self-described in California incorporation papers as a “religious society” and operated by Jules Dervaes and members of his family. After Facebook pages around the country disappeared on February 14, 2011, the urban homesteading community united in protest against the Dervaes Institute, starting two new Facebook pages and a petition on change.org demanding cancellation of the trademark. Court filings show that the Dervaes Institute had issued cease and desist letters to book authors, book publishers, farmers’ markets and even a public library.

In April 2011 Denver Urban Homesteading began legal action at the U.S. Patent and Trademark Office to cancel the trademark. According to owner James Bertini, the USPTO refused to consider the merits, even though it was obligated to hold a single hearing and cancel the trademark quickly because it was listed on the “supplemental register” rather than on the more common “principal register.” The Electronic Frontier Foundation (EFF) fared no better. Bertini said that they commenced legal action at the USPTO to cancel the Dervaes Institute’s trademark for “urban homestead,” as well as for “urban homesteading” but couldn’t get that agency to decide their case, either.

Then, in 2013 the farmers’ market sued to cancel the trademark in Colorado federal court, but after another delay - this time of one year - the judge refused to consider the case for jurisdictional reasons. So in December 2014 Denver Urban Homesteading sued in California where a judge in the U.S. District Court for the Central District of California canceled the trademark because it is generic. Generic words and phrases cannot be registered as trademarks. The case number is 2:14−cv−09216.

Denver Urban Homesteading was unable to afford a trademark lawyer so owner James Bertini, a retired general practice attorney represented the market himself. He was motivated to cancel the trademark not only to get back the farmers’ Facebook page but also as a matter of public interest since other Facebook pages had been disabled. Bertini said that he prevailed over five law firms and nearly a dozen intellectual property litigation attorneys that participated on behalf of the Dervaes Institute in those legal battles. “No small business should have to go through five years of litigation to cancel a trademark that shouldn’t exist,” Bertini said. “A small business cannot afford this burden.” Indeed, according to Bertini, his didn’t, and the farmers’ market was closed this year due to the extensive time required for litigation and travel to California for court-required meetings.

Bertini said that his research shows that this is the first time a trademark on the supplemental register was cancelled in a pre-trial order. However, he still has to go to trial in December to obtain damages. He needs to find an attorney licensed in California who can be associated with him in order to complete the case.
