= Vidal v. Elster =

- Supreme Court of the United States

Argued November 1, 2023 Decided June 13, 2024
- Full case name: Katherine K. Vidal, Undersecretary of Commerce for Intellectual Property and Director, United States Patent and Trademark Office v. Steve Elster
- Docket no.: 22-704
- Argument: Oral argument

Case history
- Prior: In re Elster, 26 F.4th 1328 (Fed. Cir. 2022)

Questions presented
- Whether the refusal to register a mark under Section 1052(c) violates the Free Speech Clause of the First Amendment when the mark contains criticism of a government official or public figure.

Court membership
- Chief Justice John Roberts Associate Justices Clarence Thomas · Samuel Alito; Sonia Sotomayor · Elena Kagan; Neil Gorsuch · Brett Kavanaugh; Amy Coney Barrett · Ketanji Brown Jackson

Case opinions
- Majority: Thomas (except Part III), joined by Alito, Gorsuch, Roberts, Kavanaugh; Barrett (Parts I, II-A, and II-B)
- Plurality: Thomas (Part III), joined by Alito, Gorsuch
- Concurrence: Kavanaugh (in part), joined by Roberts
- Concurrence: Barrett (in part), joined by Kagan; Sotomayor (Parts I, II, and III-B); Jackson (Parts I and II)
- Concurrence: Sotomayor (in judgment), joined by Kagan, Jackson

Vidal v. Elster, 602 U.S. 286 (2024), is a United States Supreme Court case dealing with 15 U.S.C. § 1052, a provision of the Lanham Act regarding trademarks using the name of living individuals without their consent. The court decided that the provision does not violate the Free Speech Clause of the First Amendment.

== Background ==
Enacted in 1946, the Lanham Act, codified at 15 U.S.C. § 1051 et seq., is the primary federal trademark law of the United States. Among other activities, the Act is intended to prohibit trademark infringement. It states:

No trademark by which the goods of the applicant may be distinguished from the goods of others shall be refused registration on the principal register on account of its nature unless it... [c]onsists of or comprises a name, portrait, or signature identifying a particular living individual except by his written consent, or the name, signature, or portrait of a deceased President of the United States during the life of his widow, if any, except by the written consent of the widow. 15 U.S.C. § 1052

== Litigation timeline ==
In 2018, Steve Elster applied for federal registration of the trademark "TRUMP TOO SMALL". Elster stated in his application that he intended to use the mark on shirts that he planned to sell.

An examining attorney at the United States Patent and Trademark Office (USPTO) refused registration under 15 U.S.C. §1052(c), stating that the use of the word "TRUMP" in the mark would likely be construed by the public as a reference to Donald Trump and that, without the then-President's written consent, the registration had to be refused.

Elster appealed to the USPTO's Trademark Trial and Appeal Board which, at the request of the examining attorney, remanded the matter back to him for further examination, at which point he identified other provisions of the Lanham Act that would forbid such a mark. The Board agreed with the examining attorney that § 1052(c) bars the registration of the mark as it included the name of the President without his written consent.

On appeal, the United States Court of Appeals for the Federal Circuit reversed the judgment of the Appeal Board. They stated that the application of the law to Elster's mark unconstitutionally restricted his speech in violation of the First Amendment. The Court stated the content-based restriction contained within the law would typically trigger either intermediate or strict scrutiny and that, absent an important or compelling state interest in privacy or the public interest, it does not meet the high bar set by these standards of judicial review.

On January 27, 2023, the United States petitioned the Supreme Court to hear the case. The Court granted certiorari on June 5, 2023. On June 13, 2024, the court unanimously ruled there is no first amendment issue with those provisions of the Lanham Act, and reversed the Court of Appeals decision.
