= College Network, Inc. v. Moore Educational Publishers, Inc. =

- Court: United States Court of Appeals for the Fifth Circuit
- Full case name: College Network, Inc., Plaintiff-Appellant v. Moore Educational Publishers, Inc. doing business as iStudySmart, Defendant-Appellee, Debra K. Moore, Intervenor Plaintiff-Appellee
- Decided: May 12, 2010
- Citation: No. 09-50596, 2010 WL 1923763 (5th Cir. May 12, 2010)

Case history
- Appealed from: United States District Court for the Western District of Texas

Court membership
- Judges sitting: Carolyn Dineen King, Jacques L. Wiener, Jr., James L. Dennis

Case opinions
- Court vacated the tortious interference relief awarded to Moore Educational, but otherwise affirmed the district court ruling.
- Decision by: Per curiam

Keywords
- Defamation, trademark infringement

College Network, Inc. v. Moore Educational Publishers, Inc., No. 09-50596 (5th Cir. 2010) was an unpublished appellate level case in the Fifth Circuit that upheld a district court jury decision to dismiss the purchase of trademarked keywords as infringing. The original suit was brought on a claim of trademark infringement in the purchase of certain advertising keywords that the defendant countered with claims of defamation and tortious interference, also known as intentional interference with contractual relations. The main issue addressed in the appeal was the sufficiency of the evidence presented in the counterclaims of the defendant. The court upheld the lower court's ruling, but vacated the award for tortious interference.

== Background ==
The College Network (TCN), founded in 1995 and based in Indianapolis, and Moore Educational Publishers (MEP), founded in Nashville in 1986 by Debra K. Moore, both published and sold study guides to nursing students nationwide. Both companies participated in sponsored-link advertising on the Internet, purchasing their respective competitor's name as a keyword in which their link would appear.

=== Business statements ===
The College Network hosted a regional sales meeting in July 2006 to train that region's sales staff on how to close sales on study guides by responding to potential customers' objections. The regional director informed the sales staff that their competitor, iStudySmart (the name under which Moore Educational Publishers does business), was "out of business" or "going out of business." In addition, the regional manager also directed the sales staff to repeat these statements to potential customers. MEP learned of these statements during their own sales meeting in May 2007. In the trial, these statements were referred to as "Business Statements."

=== Moore statements ===
A salesperson at The College Network, Shara Wright, resigned October 2006. She was later hired to work for Moore Educational Publishers. After her resignation, most of her family members who also worked at The College Network were fired. Only Glenn Cason, a high ranking College Network employee and Wright's cousin, remained. One of the terminated family members, Joel Cromer, testified that Cason explained that they were let go because of Shara's new job with Moore Educational Publishers and Debra Moore. He went on to say that Moore was a thief and dishonest, and had stolen The College Network's secrets. Moore Educational Publishers and Debra Moore discovered these statements the day before Cromer's deposition for the case in December 2007. In the case these statements were referred to as the "Moore Statements."

=== District Court case ===
On July 19, 2007, The College Network sued Moore Educational Publishers in a Texan court for trademark infringement, citing Section 43 of the Lanham Act. TCN claimed that by purchasing the keyword phrase "The College Network" to use as a click-through link which would display their advertisement, MEP was using The College Network's "trademark in commerce that was likely to cause confusion, in violation of the Lanham Act." Moore Educational Publishers admitted to purchasing the phrase, but argued they had done so only in response to discovering that The College Network was engaging in the same practice with MEP's own trademarked name. Debra Moore entered into the lawsuit on May 20, 2008, submitting counterclaims of defamation for the statements above. Moore Educational Publishers also submitted counterclaims of defamation and tortious interference related to the "Business Statements."

The case was called to trial on January 13, 2009 with a panel of eight jurors. The College Network presented expert witness Otto Wheeler, who testified that MEP's use of “The College Network” as an Internet search term created a likelihood of confusion under the Lanham Act" and pointed out "purported shortcomings" in the defendant's defamation damages model. Moore Educational Publishers presented evidence of damages from the alleged defamation, citing a correlation between the declaration of the "Business Statements" with a drop in sales, and claiming Moore's reputation suffered from the "Moore Statements." Both sides finished presenting evidence to support their respective claims on January 15, after which both the plaintiff and the defendants submitted motions for judgment as a matter of law, all of which were denied on January 16. The trial was submitted to the jury on January 20, and a verdict returned on January 21, 2009.

==== Jury verdict ====
The jury found "The College Network" to be a valid trademark, but did not find Moore Educational Publishers to be infringing on that trademark. On the part of the defendants' claims, the jury acknowledged the defamatory nature of the statements and awarded damages to Moore Educational Publishers and Debra Moore which the district court capped at the total of $137,421 in actual damages and $225,438 in exemplary damages to Moore Educational Publishers; $150,000 actual damages and $250,000 in exemplary damages to Moore.

Following the verdict, The College Network filed again for a motion for judgment as a matter of law and, alternatively, for a new trial. Denied by the district court, the plaintiff appealed.

== Court analysis ==
In approaching this case, the Court applied the de novo standard of review, with the expectation to uphold the denials of the motion for judgment as a matter of law and a new trial unless there was absolutely no evidence backing up the claim.

=== Judgment in favor of Moore ===
The first objection raised by The College Network was on the statute of limitation on the discovery of the defamatory statements. The College Network argued that the statements should not have been discoverable as Moore did not file her counterclaim within the statute of limitation. The defendants, and the district court, invoked a Texas law that exempted discovery from limitations. The College Network alleged that Moore and Moore Educational Publishers could not satisfy the two conditions that determined discovery free from limitation:

1. the nature of the injury incurred is inherently undiscoverable
2. the evidence of injury is objectively verifiable

The College Network challenged the inherent undiscoverable nature of the "Business Statements" as Moore knew about the remarks long before she filed her claims of defamation. In waiting so long, she rendered the Statements undiscoverable. The Court waived this argument as it was not brought up at the district level, and affirmed the district ruling. Furthermore, The College Network opined that Moore should have been able to discover the "Moore Statements" when interviewing Joel Cromer. The Court denied this argument on the basis it was not discoverable until December 2007, given the defendants' claim “a person interviewing for a job would not start disparaging former employers due to the negative impression it would create at a job interview.” As to the second condition, the plaintiff-appellant claimed that Moore and Moore Educational Publishers had no way of determining whether the defamatory statements were objectively verifiable. As this argument was the first brought up in the appeal, the Court waived the argument.

The second objection to the judgment regarding Moore was the legitimacy and evidence for the reputation damages. The College Network argued that any harm to Moore's reputation was based on the "Business Statements" alone, but as she was not directly harmed by the "Business Statements," there was no basis for reputation damaged. The court, once again, waives the argument as it was the first time brought up before the court.

=== Judgment in favor of Moore Educational Publishers ===
In regards to the challenges against the statute of limitations and discovery of the statements in regards to Moore Educational Publisher, the court determined the reasoning to be the same as Moore, and waived the plaintiff-appellant's argument.

The College Network argued for the reputation damages to Moore educational Publishers to be vacated as there was "no evidence of special damages...[to] MEP’s reputation." The Court waived the argument on the basis it was not raised during the trial court. However, the Court argued that even if the argument had not been waived, Moore educational Publishers did provide specific evidence of damaged reputation, from customers who did not buy from the defendants due to the "Business Statements" and the correlation to the drop of sales following the publishing of the "Business Statements."

The subsequent challenge The College Network raised was against the awards for lost profits. They claimed that Moore Education Publishers were already suffering from declining sales, and the defamatory statements did not precipitate this decline. Furthermore, the calculation for lost profits was calculated on a national scale, against the regional nature of the defamatory statements. The court waives both arguments as neither were raised or submitted specifically during the lower court case. Moreover, based on the evidence the defendants provide, Moore Educational Publishers had reasons to see a rise in profits from recent business maneuvers, such as an improved sales staff, an endorsement from an online college, and an economy seeing a rise in school enrollment.

Lastly, The College Network challenged the tortious interference awarded to Moore Educational Publishers as there was no reasonable probability that the defamatory remarks inhibited the formation of contracts. The defendants argued that the loss of profits can infer the tortious interference. On this issue, the Court sided with The College Network's and vacated the $1600 awards.

The Court addressed the issue of trademark infringement last, and set up four criteria for The College Network to show an infringement of trademark as proposed by the Lanham Act:

1. The existence of a valid trademark
2. Moore Educational Publishers used the mark in commerce without the plaintiff-appellant's approval
3. Moore Educational Publishers' use would cause confusion between the two parties
4. The College Network sustained damage as a result of this confusion

The jury trial determined the validity of The College Network's trademark, yet also determined that Moore Educational Publishers did not infringe this trademark, satisfying the first and second provision. The College Network then filed for justice as a matter of law on the basis that the evidence in trial produced evidence of confusion from the use of the trademark by Moore educational Publishers. However, Moore Educational Publishers countered on that point by arguing their use of the trademark was not in commerce, undoing the need to determine confusion from trademark infringement. At this time the Court acknowledges this was the first time the issue of whether the use of a trademark was in commerce. However, the appellate court declined to comment on the issue of whether or not purchasing a trademark for the purpose of keyword advertising counted as use in commerce, stating that by the standards of the Fifth Circuit's eight-factor test—while rejecting the use of the Ninth Circuit's 'Internet Trinity' test—there was no confusion.

== Ruling ==
=== Trademark infringement ===
While affirming the trademark of The College Network, the Court did not reevaluate the district court's decision regarding use in commerce as there was no likelihood of comparison determined under the Fifth Circuit's eight-factor test. The Court also denied to use the Ninth Circuit's 'Internet Trinity,' and so upheld the jury decided district court judgment that determined no trademark infringement occurred on the part of Moore Educational Publishers.

=== Judgment in favor of defendant-appellees ===
The Court upheld all but one of the challenged verdict. In the issue regarding tortious interference, it found The College Network correct the verdict could not stand without a reasonable probability that a contract would be established. Moore Educational Publishers had based reasonable probability from its reputation, and the tortious interference was inferred in the falling profits. The Court determined that reasoning was insufficient, and vacated the award. In all other contested awards, the Court waived The College Network's claims for not being put forth during the district court trial.

== See also ==
- 1-800 Contacts, Inc. v. WhenU.com, Inc.
- Network Automation, Inc. v. Advanced Systems Concepts, Inc.
- Rescuecom Corp. v. Google Inc.
