= Jules Dervaes =

American urban farmer

Jules C. Dervaes, Jr. (1947 – December 2016) was an urban farmer and a proponent of the urban homesteading movement. Dervaes and his three adult children operated an urban market garden in Pasadena, California, as well as other websites and online stores related to self-sufficiency and "adapting in place."

== Early life and education ==
Dervaes grew up in Tampa, Florida, and was the valedictorian of the class of 1965 at Jesuit High School. He later attended Loyola University New Orleans on full academic scholarship and graduated with a B.S. in Math and a minor in Computer Science in 1969.

After college he taught for several years. In 1973 he emigrated from the U.S. to New Zealand, specifically to a rural area on the west coast of South Island. While there, he became a beekeeper and subsistent farmer, complete with poultry and small livestock, living a simpler life and starting a family.

Dervaes and his family moved back to the Tampa Bay area in 1975, to a 10-acre plot in rural Pasco County, Florida. Here he returned to beekeeping and other agrarian pursuits, as well as teaching, although to a lesser degree. In 1984, the Dervaes family moved again, this time to Pasadena, California. At this point he went back to college, earning a theology degree. It was in Pasadena that he fully honed his urban homesteading practices.

== Self-sufficient in the city ==
Dervaes had a one-fifth acre lot in Pasadena, California, on which he and his family raised three tons of food per year. This provided 75 percent of their annual food needs, 99 percent of their produce and helped them sustain an organic produce business. They also raised ducks, chickens, goats, bees, compost worms and are running an aquaponics fish experiment.

Dervaes started experimenting with self-sufficiency while he lived in New Zealand and later in Florida, then decided to see how efficient he could make an urban homestead in Pasadena, California, USA. According to Natural Home magazine, "The Dervaeses' operation is about 60 to 150 times as efficient as their industrial competitors, without relying on chemical fertilizers and pesticides."

In addition to growing a significant amount of food, the Derveas family attempted to live off-grid as far as possible and have invested significant amounts of money to experiment with other ways of attaining self-sufficiency. They have 12 solar panels on the roof of the house, a biodiesel filling station in the garage, and a solar oven in the backyard; they use a wastewater reclamation system, a dual-flush toilet, a composting toilet, and a number of hand-cranked kitchen appliances (to reduce power consumption). They also use solar drying, and have a cob oven.

Dervaes owned several websites, including julesdervaes.com, pathtofreedom.com, urbanhomestead.org, urbanhomesteading.com, freedomgardens.org, peddlrswagon.com, backyardchickens.org, barnyardsandbackyards.org, thehiddenyears.org, and dervaesinstitute.org.

pathtofreedom.com now redirects to urbanhomestead.org; it was originally about Elian Gonzales.

As of 2008, Path to Freedom got five million hits per month from over 125 different countries.

The Dervaes family was featured on National Geographic Channel's Doomsday Preppers in 2012 and briefly appeared in a trailer for the show.

== Religious activities ==
In 2008, Dervaes operated websites promoting prophecies of the "end times" and criticizing the Worldwide Church of God's (WCG) doctrinal changes from 1995. The site's mission was "TO SHOW that repeated WARNINGS to God’s Church, beginning in 1986 after Herbert W. Armstrong's death, were ignored, by documenting the outright rejection of the messages; TO WARN God's people that the unique challenge of the Last Era is continuing to be met with the wrong solutions or none at all; TO ANNOUNCE the true and only way we can be prepared for the establishment of the Kingdom of God and Christ's Second Coming."

In 2011, Dervaes took the websites down but an archived version can be.

The family has integrated Seventh-day Sabbath observance into its business practices, per WCG's teachings.

The Dervaes Institute is registered as a tax exempt 508(c)(1)(a) organization, a status which is limited to "churches, their integrated auxiliaries, and conventions or associations of churches"

== Trademark controversy ==
In 2007, the Dervaes Institute applied to the U.S. Patent and Trademark Office to register the phrase "urban homesteading" as a service mark. In 2008, the institute followed up with a second service mark application, for the phrase "urban homestead". "Urban homesteading" was registered, but only on the Supplemental Register, after initially being denied for not being sufficiently distinctive, on June 2, 2009. "Urban homestead" was registered on the Principal Register on October 5, 2010.

In 2011 the Dervaes Institute began sending notifications to maintainers of websites who used these terms that these terms were now under their trademark and that they were not to be used without crediting the Dervaes family. The Dervaes Institute asserts that it's protecting a legitimate business interest, that their usage of the terms "urban homestead" and "urban homesteading" are new usages and distinctive, and that its trademark of the term "urban homesteading" prevents other corporations from trademarking it. However, the same usage is documented back to at least 1976 in Mother Earth News.

This has caused an uproar within the urban homesteading community and created a backlash against the Dervaes family. An activist group called "Take Back Urban Home-steading(s)," was started on Facebook on 16 February 2011.

On 21 February 2011, Corynne McSherry, Intellectual Property Director of the Electronic Frontier Foundation (which is representing Kelly Coyne and Erik Knutzen, Los Angeles-based authors of The Urban Homestead: Your Guide to Self-sufficient Living in the Heart of the City, and publisher Process Media), sent a response to the Dervaes Institute and published the letter on the Electronic Frontier Foundation website.

On 4 April 2011, the Electronic Frontier Foundation filed a petition to cancel the trademark on "urban homestead". On 7 April 2011, Denver Urban Homesteading filed a petition to cancel the trademark on "urban homesteading". Over the course of 2011, the Facebook group evolved into a general urban homesteading resource.

The urban homesteading trademark was cancelled by the federal court in Denver on November 5, 2015.

== Death ==
On December 27, 2016, via their Facebook page and website, urbanhomestead.org, Dervaes' children, Anais, Justin and Jordanne, announced that their father had died as a result of a pulmonary embolism at the age of 69.

== See also ==
- Armstrongism
