= Trademark Counterfeiting Act of 1984 =

The Trademark Counterfeiting Act of 1984 is a United States federal law that amended the federal criminal code to make it a federal offense to violate the Lanham Act by the intentional use of a counterfeit trademark or the unauthorized use of a counterfeit trademark. The act established penalties of up to five years imprisonment and/or a $250,000 fine ($1,000,000 fine for a corporation or other legal entity) for selling or attempting to sell counterfeit goods or services. It increased such penalties for a second or subsequent conviction under the Act.

== Trademark infringement ==
Trademark infringement involves the determination of the probability of confusion by consumers between two marks. Similarity of appearance, phonetics, and meaning as well as channels of trade, direct competitiveness, strength of the famous mark, and evidence of actual confusion can determine trademark infringement.

Remedies of trademark infringement include, but are not limited to; attorneys' fees, destruction of infringing products and any other materials bearing the infringing mark, profits obtained by the counterfeiter from the infringing products, and injunction relief.

== History ==
=== Trademark Act of 1870 ===
Trademark law dates back to the age of President Ulysses S. Grant starting in the late 19th century with the Trademark Act of 1870. The Trademark Act of 1870 was the first trademark act passed in the nation and grounded trademark protection into Article 1 of the U.S. Constitution. The act covered many different aspects of trademark law but failed to cover trademark counterfeiting. After much protest from merchants and manufactures around the country, Congress amended the act to make counterfeiting a crime. This, however, was short-lived, as the case U.S. v. Steffens in 1879 ruled that Article One of the Constitution could not serve as a basis of authority and thus making the Trademark Act of 1870 unconstitutional. All trademark acts after the 1870 one, including the 1881 Trademark Act and the 1946 Trademark Act (The Lanham Act), make no mention of the trademark counterfeiting provision of the 1870 act.

By the 1970s, counterfeiting was costing U.S. companies billions of dollars, upwards of $100 billion in the years leading up to the Trademark Counterfeiting Act of 1984. Unless the counterfeiting manufacturer was large enough, little could be done to prosecute illegal counterfeiters. Most counterfeit manufactures were small companies that once a civil suit was filed against them, would virtually disappear. Lack of penalties for counterfeiters also meant that products could be sold that were not safe and up to regulatory standards including medications, cosmetics, and machinery parts.

In October 1984, after much lobbying by industry groups, mainly the International AntiCounterfeiting Coalition (IACC), President Ronald Reagan signed into law the Trademark Counterfeiting Act of 1984 (S.875). Senator Charles Mathias Jr., the Chairman of the subcommittee on Patents, Copyrights, and Trademarks of the Senate Judiciary Committee sponsored the act. In enacting the Trademark Counterfeiting Act of 1984, Congress sought to provide trademark owners with more powerful weapons against persons involved in trademark counterfeiting, including protection of not only intentional copying of trademarks, but also entire products as well. Those who were in favor of the act were pleased with it while those against it claimed it was "manifestly unfair", "heavy-handed", and "overreaching".

== Penalties under the act ==
The Senate and House bills both aimed at accomplishing three primary changes in the law: First, creation of criminal penalties for intentionally dealing in materials that one knows to be counterfeit; second, authorization for mandatory or virtually mandatory awards of treble (sic) damages and attorneys fees in civil counterfeiting cases; and third, authorization for ex parte court orders for the seizure of counterfeit materials when it can be shown that the defendant would be likely to attempt to conceal or transfer the materials.

The Trademark Counterfeiting Act of 1984 made it illegal for anyone to intentionally traffic or attempt to traffic goods or services knowingly using a counterfeit mark, which is defined as

a spurious mark and spurious designations (1) used in connection with trafficking in goods or services (2) identical with, or substantially indistinguishable from, a mark registered for those goods and services on the United States Patent and Trademark Office's Principal Register (whether or not the defendant knew the mark was registered) and in use and (3) the use of which is likely to deceive, confuse, or cause mistake on the part of the consuming public.

These counterfeit goods include numerous things such as labels, stickers, wrappers, charms, cases, tags, and patches. Originally under the act, the penalty for being convicted for trademark counterfeiting was a fine up to $100,000 and a prison sentence of up to five years plus paying attorney fees to the trademark owners. These penalties were later amended and called for a fine of up to $2 million and/or imprisonment for up to 10 years, with large companies being fined up to $5 million. If charged more than once for trademark infringement, individuals can be fined up to $5 million and/or be imprisoned for up to 20 years while corporations may be fined up to $15 million. Counterfeiters of safety-sensitive products, such as pharmaceuticals, would get the maximum penalty set forward in the act.

=== Provision 1: ex parte seizure ===
One of the most powerful provisions under the Trademark Act of 1984 is that of ex parte seizure. Under this part of the act, an aggrieved party may seize the counterfeit goods, business documents, and machines used that the counterfeiter has without notice to the counterfeiter. The section on ex parte seizure amends the Lanham Act, creating stronger remedies in civil cases involving the intentional use of counterfeit trademarks.

Trademark registrants may apply for an ex parte seizure through the courts without notifying the counterfeiting party. The courts, however, will not grant the ex parte seizure unless

1. the applicant knows where the goods to be seized are located
2. the ex parte seizure will show that there was in fact trademark infringement
3. an ex parte seizure is the only order that is adequate
4. the applicant specifies the time period the seizure will occur within a limited time frame
5. the seizure is not publicized
6. the harm to the trademark holder is greater than the harm to the counterfeiter
7. immediate harm will occur without the seizure to the trademark holder and
8. the person obtaining the order provides security to cover the damages the adverse party may suffer due to the ex parte seizure.

=== Provision 2 ===
The second provision of the Trademark Counterfeiting Act of 1984 deals with damages that may be recovered against users of counterfeit trademarks; treble profits or damages (damages awarded in an amount that is three times the amount for which the wrongdoer is found liable for), whichever is greater, and reasonable attorney fees.

== Counterfeiting today ==
Counterfeiting remains a growing problem in the modern world economy. The garment industry is one of the largest areas of counterfeit goods. Louis Vuitton estimates two to three million counterfeit Louis Vuitton pieces are produced each year—about twice the number of genuine products it manufactures. Because of this, Louis Vuitton spends upwards of 5% of its revenue fighting off counterfeiters; about 1,500 actions/civil proceedings. According to the International Trademark Association, between 1991–1995, apparel and footwear companies lost 22 percent of their sales, around $2.1 billion, due to trademark counterfeiting.

In addition to the garment industry, automotive parts is also a large area of counterfeit goods. The U.S auto industry alone said it would employ another 200,000-plus employees if it could manage to put counterfeit supplies out of business.

== Sources ==
- Library of Congress
