= ETW Corporation v. Jireh Publishing Inc. =

ETW Corporation v. Jireh Publishing Inc. is a United States Court of Appeals case that disputes Trademark rights and infringement. The Sixth Circuit ruled in favor of the defendant, Jireh Publishing Incorporated. Jireh Publishing sold copies of Rick Rush's art work with golfer, Tiger Woods, in the painting. Jireh Publishing Inc. claimed that it's their First Amendment right to allow Rush to create his piece of artwork.

ETW Corporation signed with Tiger Woods to have legal rights over his name and image to sell goods. Later, Jireh Publishing Inc. sold copies of Rick Rush's painting of Tiger Woods. ETW Corporation sued Jireh Publishing because they claimed they owned all rights to Tiger Woods and his likeness.

== Background ==
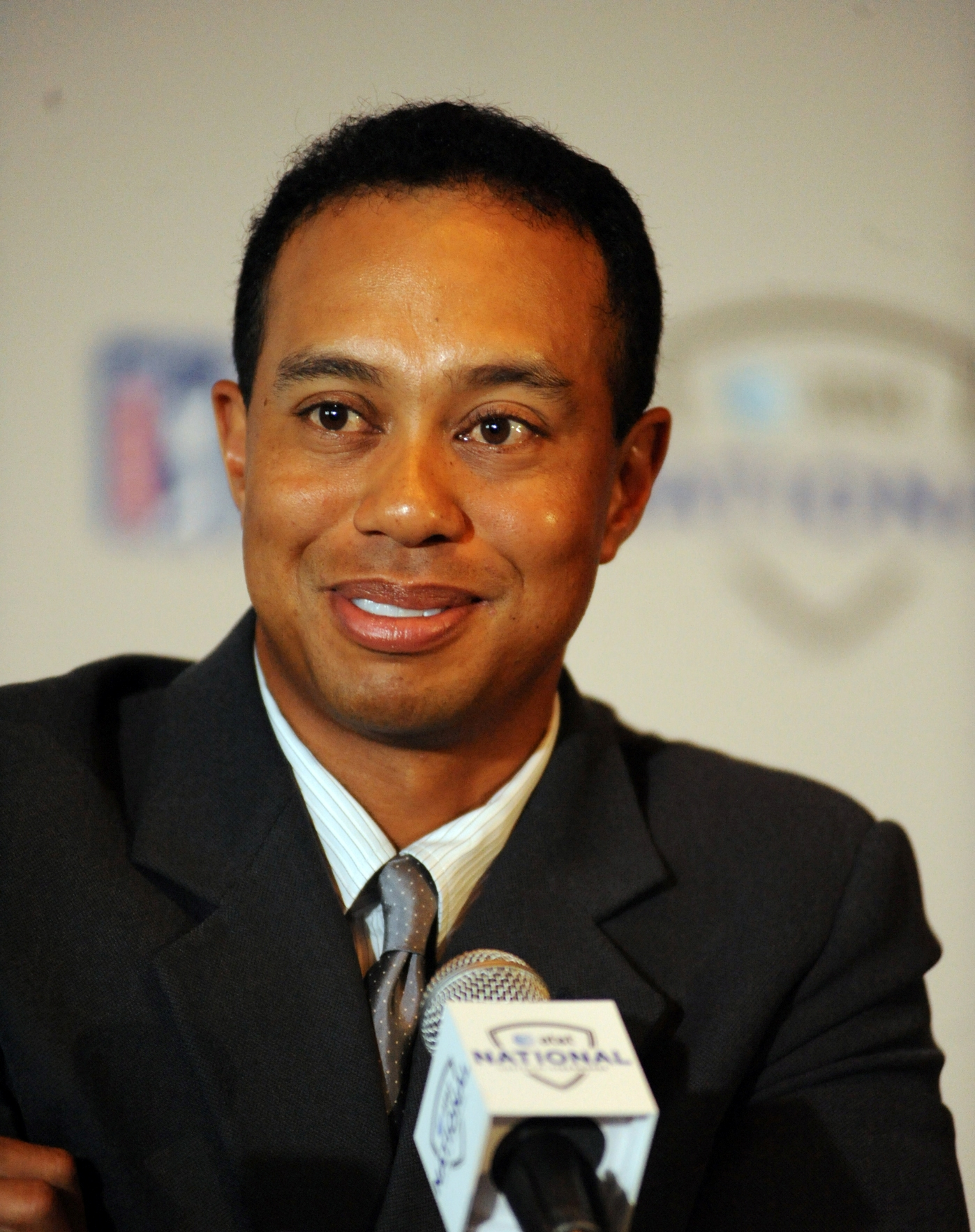
Golfer, Tiger Woods

In 1998, Rick Rush painted an art peace called "The Masters of Augusta" which featured Tiger Woods and other famous golfers in the painting. Jireh Publishing Inc. made copies for resale and ETW Corporation sued Jireh Publishing. ETW owned all things Tiger Woods, they claim this painting which features the likeness of Tiger Woods violated the Lanham Act. Rick Rush has made other paintings before of athletes and Jireh Publishing has sold copies of his work for Rush.

== Argument ==
A large part of the argument is that Rick Rush specializes in sports art and ETW was trying to make a claim that Rush was creating sports merchandise for resale which is what ETW does and has the rights for Tiger Woods. So by Rush creating and Jireh Publishing selling his art, it would be a trademark violation against ETW since they have the rights to Wood's name, image and likeness.

== Lower Courts ==
This case went through the United States District Court first. The case in front of the District Court found that Jireh Publishing Inc. is entitled to sell and Rick Rush is allowed to create his artwork. The First Amendment allows those who are not replicating an actual photograph to create artwork such as Rick Rush and his drawing/painting of the golf tournament in Augusta. Creative outlets are covered under the First Amendment as long as it's not a replication of a licensed photograph. This resulted in ETW losing the case. The plaintiff's ( ETW Corporation) appealed and the case went to the United States Court of Appeals. This is where the appellate court ruled in favor of the defendant again and agreed with the district court on the painting/drawing being a creative liberty and if it were to be a trademark violation it would also be a violation of the First Amendment.

== Significance ==
Both the District Court and the Court of Appeals agreed that Jireh Publishing's client Rick Rush did not violate trademark law because of the creative element of his art work. This is a creative expression and is protected under the First Amendment. The ETW Corporation v. Jireh Publishing Inc. case has been used and referenced in other trademark cases where one side argues that the artists work is protected under the First Amendment.
