= John Fruhmorgen =

American football player (born 1965)

No. 76
- Position: Guard

Personal information
- Born: September 28, 1965 (age 61); Buffalo, New York

Career information
- High school: Tampa (FL) Jesuit
- College: Alabama
- NFL draft: 1989: undrafted

Career history
- London Monarchs (1991)

John Fruhmorgen (born September 28, 1965) was an American football Player in the National Football League for the Miami Dolphins and in The World Football League, London Monarchs. Fruhmorgen attended and played for the University of Alabama. Raised in Tampa, Florida, he attended Jesuit High School.

Currently is the owner/operator of staffyourdealer.com

John's son, Jake, was a football player for Clemson in 2015 and 2016. He transferred to Baylor University in 2017.
