= Tommy Eveld =

American baseball player (born 1993)

- Pitcher
- Born: December 30, 1993 (age 31); Coral Springs, Florida, U.S.
- Bats: Right Throws: Right

Thomas Patrick Eveld (born December 30, 1993) is an American former professional baseball pitcher.

== Professional career ==
=== Amateur ===
Eveld attended Jesuit High School in Tampa, Florida. He played baseball and American football at Jesuit, giving up baseball to focus on football after the 10th grade. Without a scholarship offer from an NCAA Division I school, he accepted an offer from the University of South Florida to attempt to walk on to the South Florida Bulls football team as a quarterback. He made the Bulls as a wide receiver, but tore his anterior cruciate ligament (ACL) in 2014, requiring surgery. He joined the South Florida Bulls baseball team in 2015. He was later diagnosed with a re-tear of the ACL, and had a second surgery.

=== Arizona Diamondbacks ===
The Arizona Diamondbacks selected Eveld in the ninth round, with 269th overall selection, of the 2016 Major League Baseball draft. He made his professional debut that year with the Low–A Hillsboro Hops, going 2–1 with a 1.86 ERA in 29 relief innings pitched. In 2017, he had an 0.33 ERA and 14 saves for the Single–A Kane County Cougars before earning a midseason promotion to the High–A Visalia Rawhide. In 19 relief appearances for Visalia, he was 0–5 with a 5.73 ERA. He began the 2018 season with Visalia and was promoted to the Double–A Jackson Generals in July.

=== Miami Marlins ===
On July 31, 2018, Eveld was traded to the Miami Marlins in exchange for Brad Ziegler. He was assigned to the Double–A Jacksonville Jumbo Shrimp and finished the year there. In 45 relief appearances between Visalia, Jackson, and Jacksonville, he was 4–3 with a 1.07 ERA and a 0.93 WHIP. In 2019, Eveld split the year between Double-A Jacksonville and the Triple-A New Orleans Baby Cakes, posting a cumulative 5.11 ERA in 42 appearances. Eveld did not play in a game in 2020 due to the cancellation of the minor league season because of the COVID-19 pandemic.

Eveld split the 2021 season between Jacksonville and the Single-A Jupiter Hammerheads, logging a 3.33 ERA with 59 strikeouts in 38 games between the two teams. Eveld spent the majority of 2022 with Triple-A Jacksonville. In 23 games, he posted a 1–2 record and 3.38 ERA with 31 strikeouts in 34.2 innings pitched. He elected free agency following the season on November 10, 2022.

=== Cincinnati Reds ===
On February 10, 2023, Eveld signed a minor league contract with the Cincinnati Reds organization. He made 19 appearances for the Double–A Chattanooga Lookouts, as well as one appearance for the Triple–A Louisville Bats, and accumulated a 5.01 ERA with 38 strikeouts and 4 saves in 32 1/3 innings of work. Eveld was released by the Reds on July 9.

On August 28, 2024, Eveld announced his retirement from professional baseball.

== Personal life ==
Eveld has two brothers, Bobby and Wesley, and one sister, Tiffany. Bobby and Wesley played baseball for Jesuit and South Florida, while Bobby also played for their football teams. Eveld's fiancé, Erica, played for the South Florida Bulls softball team.
