= Leonard George (student athlete) =

Florida Gators
- Position: Halfback

Career information
- High school: Jesuit High School (Tampa)
- College: Florida (1969–72)

Leonard George was the first African-American player to receive a football scholarship at the University of Florida. He was signed in 1968, ten years after the school was integrated in 1958.

George went to Jesuit High School in Tampa, Florida. He signed an athletic scholarship on December 17, 1968. He was a halfback. The following day Willie Jackson of Sarasota, Florida also signed a football scholarship with the University of Florida. Both players became varsity players in their second year at the school and started most games over the rest of their careers at UF.

George was the first black player to score a touchdown on Alabama in Tuscaloosa. He became a defensive back his junior and senior years.

The student athletes remained at the university after a 1971 protest by the Black Student Union leading to the arrest of 66 students charges being filed against them. One third of black students and several black faculty members left the University of Florida following the events. Don Gaffney became UF's first black quarterback in 1973.
