= Dastar Corp. v. Twentieth Century Fox Film Corp. =

- Supreme Court of the United States

Argued April 2, 2003 Decided June 2, 2003
- Full case name: Dastar Corporation, Petitioner v. Twentieth Century Fox Film Corporation, et al.
- Citations: 539 U.S. 23 (more) 123 S. Ct. 2041; 156 L. Ed. 2d 18; 2003 U.S. LEXIS 4276; 71 U.S.L.W. 4415; 66 U.S.P.Q.2D (BNA) 1641; Copy. L. Rep. (CCH) ¶ 28,622; 194 A.L.R. Fed. 731; 2003 Cal. Daily Op. Service 4554; 2003 Daily Journal DAR 5799; 16 Fla. L. Weekly Fed. S 330

Case history
- Prior: Judgment for plaintiffs, 2000 U.S. Dist. LEXIS 22064 (C.D. Cal. Nov. 27, 2000); affirmed in part, sub nom. Twentieth Century Fox Film Corp. v. Entertainment Distributing, 34 Fed. Appx. 312 (9th Cir. 2002); cert. granted, sub nom. Dastar Corp. v. Twentieth Century Fox Film Corp., 537 U.S. 1099 (2003)
- Subsequent: Judgment for plaintiffs, 2003 U.S. Dist. LEXIS 21194 (C.D. Cal. Oct. 14, 2003); affirmed, sub nom. Twentieth Century Fox Film Corp. v. Entertainment Distributing, 429 F.3d 869 (9th Cir. 2005)

Holding
- Plagiarism of public domain works is not a crime under the Lanham Act, which requires only designation of the origin for the original, physical goods rather than the intangible ideas contained therein. Ninth Circuit Court of Appeals reversed and remanded.

Court membership
- Chief Justice William Rehnquist Associate Justices John P. Stevens · Sandra Day O'Connor; Antonin Scalia · Anthony Kennedy; David Souter · Clarence Thomas; Ruth Bader Ginsburg · Stephen Breyer

Case opinion
- Majority: Scalia, joined by unanimous
- Breyer took no part in the consideration or decision of the case.

Laws applied
- Lanham Act § 43(a), 15 U.S.C. § 1125(a)

Dastar Corp. v. Twentieth Century Fox Film Corp., 539 U.S. 23 (2003), was a copyright and trademark case of the Supreme Court of the United States involving the applicability of the Lanham Act to a work in the public domain.

== Background ==
In 1948, Fox obtained the exclusive rights to create a television series, Crusade in Europe, based on a 1948 book Crusade in Europe, written by Dwight Eisenhower and published by Doubleday. The 26-episode series showed World War II film footage from the US military and other sources, with a voice soundtrack based on a narration of the book. In 1975, Doubleday renewed the copyright on the book. Fox, however, did not renew the copyright on the TV series and so the show entered the public domain in 1977.

In 1988, Fox reacquired the television rights to the book and licensed it to other companies the right to distribute Crusade in Europe on video. In 1995, Dastar purchased Betacam videotapes of the original TV series, copied the tapes, edited them to about half the original length, created new packaging, and sold the TV series as World War II Campaigns in Europe. The new videotapes and advertising mentioned Dastar and its employees as the producer but did not mention the original Crusade in Europe book, TV series, or producers.

Fox sued in 1998 by claiming that Dastar had infringed the copyright to the Crusade in Europe book and that under the Lanham Act, it had illegally done a "reverse passing off" by passing off the work of others as its own work. The district court found for Fox and awarded it double the profits that Dastar had made. The Court of Appeals reversed the copyright claim and sent it back to the district court on remand, but it upheld the "reverse passing off" Lanham Act ruling and affirmed the award of double the profits.

== Decision ==
The U.S. Supreme Court, ruling only on the "reverse passing off" claim, reversed the decisions of the appeals court and district court, ruling 8–0 in favor of Dastar. The Court reasoned that although the Lanham Act forbids a reverse passing off, the rule regarding the misuse of trademarks is trumped by the fact that once a copyrighted work (or even a patented invention) enters into the public domain, anyone in the public may do anything with the work, with or without attribution to the author.

Justice Antonin Scalia, writing in the decision, noted that the Court in the past has held that the Lanham Act "does not exist to reward manufacturers for their innovation in creating a particular device; that is the purpose of the patent law and its period of exclusivity." Therefore, claims about authorship cannot be used as an end-run around the underlying philosophy of a time limit on exclusive ownership of a copyright or patent. Allowing such restrictions on a public domain work would serve, Scalia wrote, "to create a species of mutant copyright law that limits the public's 'federal right to "copy and to use"' expired copyrights," and that would effectively create "a species of perpetual patent and copyright, which Congress may not do," according to Article I of the US Constitution.

Scalia noted that if Dastar had instead purchased the post-1988 videotapes and copied them, that would have been a clear copyright infringement.

== Analysis ==
In reconciling this case with the earlier Eldred v. Ashcroft, Kurt M. Saunders considered Dastar a reassurance from the Supreme Court that, although Eldred said Congress was free to extend copyright durations, a work outside of copyright was free to use.

== Subsequent history ==
On remand, the district court, after the Supreme Court's ruling, dismissed Twentieth Century Fox's Lanham Act claims as well as analogous California state law unfair competition claims. The only remaining issue was whether the plaintiffs had a copyright in the underlying work, Eisenhower's book Crusade in Europe. The district court held a bench trial and determined that the plaintiffs owned a valid copyright in the book and that Dastar had infringed that copyright by including portions of the book's narrative in its film version. Dastar appealed, but the Ninth Circuit affirmed.

== See also ==
- List of leading legal cases in copyright law
- List of United States Supreme Court cases, volume 539
- List of United States Supreme Court cases
- It's a Wonderful Life § Release (also had legal issues relating to an out-of-copyright adaptation of a work still under copyright)
