= POM Wonderful LLC v. Coca-Cola Co. =

- Supreme Court of the United States

Argued April 21, 2014 Decided June 12, 2014
- Full case name: POM Wonderful LLC v. The Coca-Cola Company
- Docket no.: 12-761
- Citations: 573 U.S. 102 (more) 134 S. Ct. 2228; 189 L. Ed. 2d 141
- Argument: Oral argument
- Opinion announcement: Opinion announcement

Case history
- Prior: 679 F.3d 1170 (May 17, 2012), cert. granted, 571 U. S. 1118 (2014)

Holding
- Reversed and remanded. Neither the Lanham Act nor the Food, Drug, and Cosmetic Act, in express terms, forbids or limits private Lanham Act claims challenging labels that are regulated by the other Act.

Court membership
- Chief Justice John Roberts Associate Justices Antonin Scalia · Anthony Kennedy; Clarence Thomas · Ruth Bader Ginsburg; Stephen Breyer · Samuel Alito; Sonia Sotomayor · Elena Kagan

Case opinion
- Majority: Kennedy, joined by Roberts, Scalia, Thomas, Ginsburg, Alito, Sotomayor, Kagan
- Breyer took no part in the consideration or decision of the case.

Laws applied
- Lanham Act (15 U.S.C. § 1125); Food, Drug, and Cosmetic Act (21 U.S.C. § 341, 21 U.S.C. § 343, 21 CFR 102.33)

POM Wonderful LLC v. Coca-Cola Co., 573 U.S. 102 (2014), was a United States Supreme Court case that held that a statutory private right of action under the Lanham Act is not precluded by regulatory provisions of the Food, Drug, and Cosmetic Act.

== Background ==
=== Regulation of food and drug labeling ===
In 1938, the United States Congress passed the Food, Drug, and Cosmetic Act, in order to regulate the safety of food, drugs, and cosmetics. Under the Act, the Food and Drug Administration has issued regulations governing food and beverage labeling, including the labeling of mixes of different types of juice into one juice blend. In particular, if a juice blend does not name all the juices it contains and mentions only juices that are not predominant in the blend, then it must either declare the percentage content of the named juice or "[i]ndicate that the named juice is present as a flavor or flavoring."

Private parties are not allowed to bring enforcement actions under the Act. In addition, Congress amended it in order to provide for preemption of certain State laws dealing with product misbranding.

=== Lanham Act claims ===
In 1946, Congress enacted the Lanham Act in order to govern the use of trademarks. Among its stated aims was the regulation of "commerce within the control of Congress by making actionable the deceptive and misleading use of marks in such commerce," and provision was made for civil enforcement actions to be available for private parties in the federal courts.

=== The case at hand ===
POM Wonderful is a grower of pomegranates and a distributor of pomegranate juices, including a pomegranate-blueberry juice blend. The Coca-Cola Company, through its Minute Maid division, created a pomegranate-blueberry juice product that in reality was 99.4% apple and grape juices. The front label of its package carried the words "pomegranate blueberry" in capital letters, below which the phrase "flavored blend of 5 juices" appeared in much smaller type, followed in still smaller type by "from concentrate with added ingredients and other natural flavors" (presented over two lines).

POM brought suit under the Lanham Act in the United States District Court for the Central District of California, alleging that the name, label, marketing, and advertising of Coca-Cola's juice blend misled consumers as to its actual content, thereby causing POM to lose sales.

== Lower courts ==
The District Court granted partial summary judgment to Coca-Cola, ruling that the FDCA and its regulations preclude challenges to the name and the label of Coca-Cola's juice blend. On appeal, the United States Court of Appeals for the Ninth Circuit affirmed in the relevant part.

== Supreme Court decision ==
The Ninth Circuit ruling was reversed and remanded. In a unanimous decision written by Justice Kennedy, the Court held:

- The case was one not of preemption but of preclusion and so any "presumption against pre-emption" has no force. "Although the Court's pre-emption precedent does not govern preclusion analysis in this case, its principles are instructive insofar as they are designed to assess the interaction of laws that bear on the same subject."
- As this is a statutory interpretation case, the Court relies on traditional rules of statutory interpretation. That does not change because the case involves multiple federal statutes, nor does it change because an agency is involved.
- "When two statutes complement each other, it would show disregard for the congressional design to hold that Congress nonetheless intended one federal statute to preclude the operation of the other."
- "A holding that the FDCA precludes Lanham Act claims challenging food and beverage labels would not only ignore the distinct functional aspects of the FDCA and the Lanham Act but also would lead to a result that Congress likely did not intend."
- "Even if agency regulations with the force of law that purport to bar other legal remedies may do so, it is a bridge too far to accept an agency's after-the-fact statement to justify that result here. An agency may not reorder federal statutory rights without congressional authorization."

== Subsequent jury trial ==
The case went back to the California federal district court and eventually proceeded to jury trial, where it was established that Coca-Cola Co.'s Minute Maid "Enhanced Pomegranate Blueberry Flavored 100% Juice Blend" was 99.4% apple and grape juices and only 0.3% pomegranate juice, 0.2% blueberry juice, and 0.1% raspberry juice.

On March 18, 2016, POM made its closing arguments, and the case went to the jury with POM claiming losses of $10 million per year from 2007 to 2014 (totaling more than $77 million) caused by Coca-Cola's Minute Maid pomegranate and blueberry juice drink misleading labeling and advertising. On March 21, 2016, the California jury unanimously rejected POM's claim that the labeling of Minute Maid's pomegranate-blueberry juice blend (which did comply with FDA labeling requirements) was either misleading or unfair competition and found that the labeling did not mislead a substantial portion of consumers, in favor of Coca-Cola, ending eight years of litigation.

== See also ==
- List of United States Supreme Court cases, volume 573
