= Brad Ziegler =

American baseball player (born 1979)

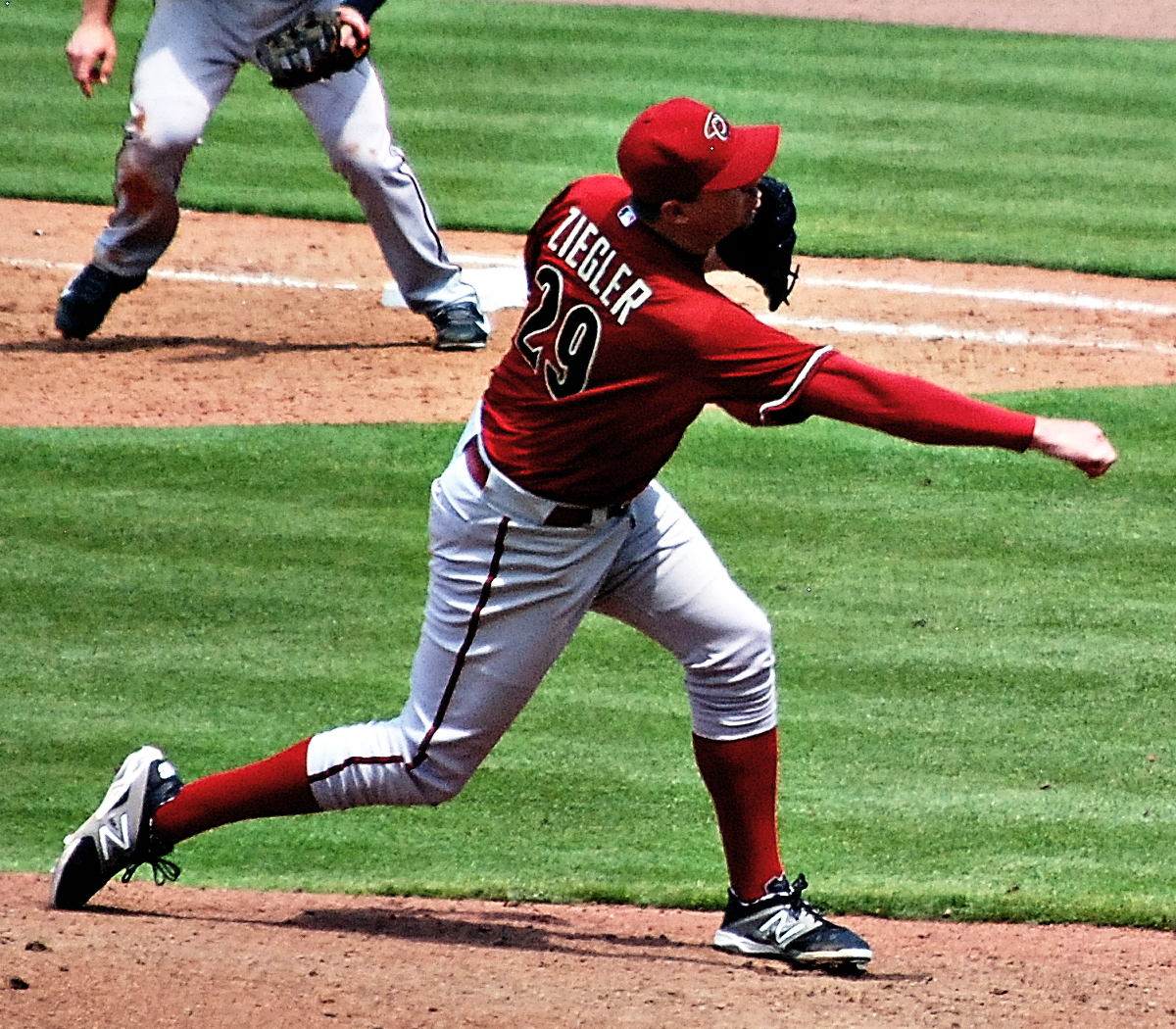
- Ziegler with the Arizona Diamondbacks in 2014
- Pitcher
- Born: October 10, 1979 (age 46); Pratt, Kansas, U.S.
- Batted: Right Threw: Right

MLB debut
- May 31, 2008, for the Oakland Athletics

Last MLB appearance
- September 29, 2018, for the Arizona Diamondbacks

MLB statistics
- Win–loss record: 37–38
- Earned run average: 2.75
- Strikeouts: 479
- Saves: 105
- Stats at Baseball Reference

Teams
- Oakland Athletics (2008–2011); Arizona Diamondbacks (2011–2016); Boston Red Sox (2016); Miami Marlins (2017–2018); Arizona Diamondbacks (2018)

Brad Gregory Ziegler (born October 10, 1979) is an American former professional baseball pitcher. He pitched in Major League Baseball (MLB) for the Oakland Athletics, Arizona Diamondbacks, Boston Red Sox, and Miami Marlins. Ziegler was one of the few Major League pitchers to throw with a submarine delivery.

== Early life and career ==
Ziegler was born in Pratt, Kansas, but his family moved to Springfield, Illinois, when he was six months old. Ziegler attended Odessa High School in Odessa, Missouri. He then enrolled at Southwest Missouri State University, where he played college baseball for the Southwest Missouri State Bears. In 2001, he played collegiate summer baseball for the Chatham A's of the Cape Cod Baseball League, and returned in 2002 to play with the league's Harwich Mariners where he was named a league all-star. In 2003, Ziegler helped lead the Bears to the College World Series.

== Professional career ==
=== Minor leagues ===
The Oakland Athletics selected Ziegler in the 31st round, with the 938th overall selection, of the 2002 MLB draft, but he returned to Missouri State for his senior year. Upon graduating, the Philadelphia Phillies selected him in the 20th round, with the 595th overall selection, of the 2003 MLB draft. He only threw six innings for the short season Batavia Muckdogs due to shoulder tendinitis. The Phillies released him a week before the start of the 2004 season because they felt he was not good enough to pitch in Low-A and too old to return to short season ball.

Ziegler signed with the Schaumburg Flyers of the independent Northern League. After making four starts for Schaumburg, the Athletics purchased his contract. They assigned him to the Modesto Athletics of the Class A-Advanced California League, pitching in their starting rotation. After a solid season helping Modesto to the league playoffs, while pitching in his first game in the playoffs, Ziegler was hit in the head by a line drive off the bat of Fred Lewis, playing for the San Jose Giants at the time. Ziegler suffered a fracture of the skull, but recovered in time to pitch again in 2005, earning a promotion to the Double-A Midland RockHounds of the Texas League.

Continuing to start through the 2006 season, Ziegler moved further up the organizational ladder and pitched in a few games for the Sacramento River Cats of the Triple-A Pacific Coast League, though he struggled in his brief time there.

Before the start of the 2007 season, Ziegler was approached by Ron Romanick, the minor league pitching coordinator for the Athletics, about converting to a sidearm/submarine style of pitching. He agreed to the change and spent the 2007 season in both Midland and Sacramento as a relief pitcher, improving the more he became accustomed to the change.

This led to a strong start to the 2008 season in Sacramento prior to joining the major league club, though he suffered a second fracture of the skull in January during a workout following a youth camp he was assisting with. A thrown baseball deflected off another glove, hitting him in the forehead. Again, Ziegler recovered with no negative long-term effects.

=== Oakland Athletics ===
Ziegler received his first call-up to MLB on May 30, 2008, when the Athletics purchased his contract from the Triple-A Sacramento River Cats. In 19 relief appearances with the River Cats before his promotion, Ziegler was 2–0 with a 0.37 earned run average (ERA). He had allowed just one earned run on 15 hits in 24.1 innings, while striking out 20. He earned his first MLB win on June 8 against the Los Angeles Angels of Anaheim.

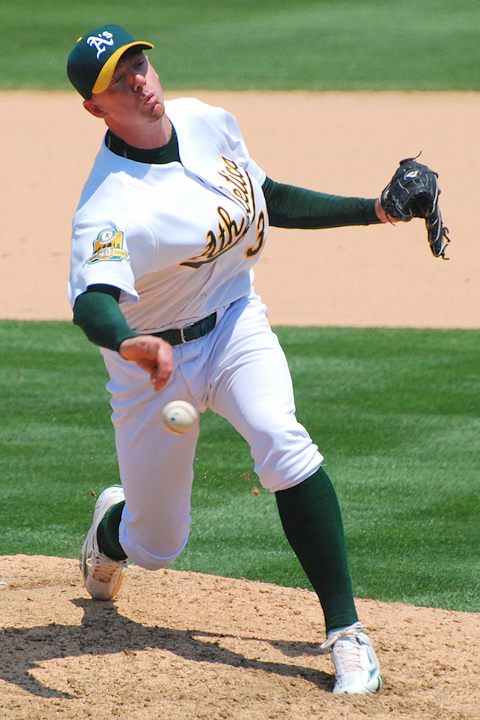
Ziegler pitching for the Oakland Athletics in 2008

On July 22, Ziegler set an American League record for consecutive scoreless innings to start an MLB career (23) after pitching two innings against the Tampa Bay Rays. The previous American League mark was 22 innings, set by Dave Ferriss of the Boston Red Sox in 1945. After pitching two further scoreless innings against the Texas Rangers, Ziegler then broke the Major League record of 25 innings on July 27, which had been held by George McQuillan of the Philadelphia Phillies since 1907.

Ziegler picked up his first MLB career save and became the Athletics new closer on August 8 against the Detroit Tigers. In earning his second on August 12 against the Tampa Bay Rays, he established a new Oakland record for consecutive scoreless innings at any point in a career with 38, passing starting pitcher Mike Torrez, who reached 37 in 1976.

Ziegler's streak came to an end at 39 innings when the Tampa Bay Rays scored a run against him in the ninth inning on August 14. Akinori Iwamura scored on a double by B.J. Upton, which was also the first extra base hit Ziegler had allowed in the Majors. He had tied Al Benton after a scoreless eighth inning, finishing at 39. Benton did it in 1949 with the Cleveland Indians, though he allowed runs during that stretch as a starter. Ziegler also tied Christy Mathewson for second place for scoreless innings by a rookie. Mathewson's streak came in 1901 as a member of the New York Giants. Grover Cleveland Alexander holds the record for a rookie, throwing 41 consecutive scoreless innings in 1911 with the Philadelphia Phillies.

=== Arizona Diamondbacks ===
On July 31, 2011, the Athletics traded Ziegler to the Arizona Diamondbacks for Brandon Allen and Jordan Norberto. On December 20, 2013, the Diamondbacks reported they had reached an agreement for a two-year contract with Ziegler, worth $10.5 million. He earned $4.5 million for the 2014 season and $5 million for the 2015 season, with a $5.5 million option for 2016, or $1 million buyout. On November 3, 2015, the Diamondbacks exercised Ziegler's 2016 option.

=== Boston Red Sox ===
On July 9, 2016, the Diamondbacks traded Ziegler to the Boston Red Sox for Luis Alejandro Basabe and José Almonte. In 33 appearances for Boston, Ziegler posted a 1.52 ERA, 31 strikeouts, and 11 walks in 29 2/3 innings.

=== Miami Marlins ===
On December 23, 2016, Ziegler signed a two-year, $16 million contract with the Miami Marlins. In 2017, he posted a 4.79 ERA, 26 strikeouts and 16 walks in 47 innings.

=== Arizona Diamondbacks (second stint) ===
On July 31, 2018, Ziegler was traded back to the Diamondbacks in exchange for Tommy Eveld. He finished the 2018 season leading all pitchers with 82 appearances.

After the season ended, on October 10, 2018, Ziegler announced his retirement from baseball.

== Personal life ==
Ziegler and his wife, Kristen, have two children, and live in Kansas City, Kansas.

Ziegler is an avid collector of baseball cards.

In 2011, Ziegler created a foundation, Pastime for Patriots Foundation which treats United States Military members and their families to sporting event tickets, among other things. He was awarded the Bob Feller Act of Valor Award in 2016 for his work with military members and their families.
