= Jesuit High School (Tampa) =

- Forming young men in the Tampa Bay area since 1899

Location
- 4701 North Himes Avenue; Tampa, Hillsborough County, Florida; United States; 27.986865°N 82.499755°W

Information
- Type: Private, all-male
- Religious affiliations: Roman Catholic (Jesuits)
- Established: 1899; 127 years ago
- Founder: Society of Jesus
- President: Rev. Vincent A. Giacabazi, S.J.
- Chairperson: Steve Barbas '72
- Dean: Mr. Brian Greenfield
- Rector: Rev. Angel Rivera-Fals, S.J.
- Director: Steve Matesich, '91 (Dir. of Admissions); Terry Rupp, '84 (Director of Athletics); Nick Suszynski ’98 (Dir. of Development)
- Principal: Mr. Mike Scicchitano
- Grades: 9–12
- Enrollment: 850 (2021)
- Campus size: 40 acres (160,000 m^{2})
- Colors: Blue and White
- Athletics conference: FHSAA
- Mascot: Tiger
- Team name: Tigers
- Rival: Tampa Catholic High School
- Accreditation: SACS
- Yearbook: The Tiger
- Tuition: $17,870 (2021-22)
- Affiliation: JSN
- Medium_of_Instruction: English
- Website: www.jesuittampa.org

Jesuit High School is an all-male Catholic high school run by the U.S. Central and Southern Province of the Society of Jesus in Tampa, Florida. The school was established in 1899 by the Jesuits and operates independently of the Roman Catholic Diocese of Saint Petersburg. The school teaches a college preparatory curriculum, and has been named a Blue Ribbon School of Excellence.

The school encourages its students to be "Men for Others,” which is a student model derived from a 1973 speech given by Jesuit Father General Pedro Arrupe. Arrupe led the Jesuits in the transitional years after the Second Vatican Council from 1965 to 1983, when the Jesuit order incorporated that Council's teachings into its institutions.

== History ==
Jesuit High School was founded in 1899 as Sacred Heart College and affiliated with St. Louis Parish, the original name of Sacred Heart Parish, then a Jesuit-run parish. This original facility was located in downtown Tampa at the corner of Florida Avenue and Madison Street.

By the mid-1950s, enrollment had exceeded the capacity of the original building. Father Michael Kennelly, S.J., who served as the school's president and rector from 1953 until 1959, spearheaded a $600,000 capital campaign and the purchase of 80 acres of rural grazing land on Himes Avenue in West Tampa, where the school moved to in 1956. Kennelly designed this new campus, centered around St. Anthony's Chapel.

Jesuit High School had an enrollment of 245 students at the time of its relocation in 1956 and as of August 2015, had approximately 775 students. Jesuit has been rated first among all-boys schools in Florida and second among Catholic schools.

== Curriculum ==
Jesuit's curriculum includes mathematics, science, fine arts, language arts, foreign language, social studies, physical education, and theology. Advanced Placement classes are offered in 29 different areas. Of the more than 90 members of the faculty, several are Jesuit priests. The Jesuits serve in administration and teaching roles, in addition to campus ministry. Daily Masses are held in the Jesuit chapel at 7:30 am, and a monthly all-school Mass has been held in the Chapel of the Holy Cross since it opened in 2018. School years begin with the traditional Mass of the Holy Spirit.

== Athletics ==
The school won the FHSAA Boys' Athletic Program of the Year award in 1997–1998. The Tigers are at or near the top of the FHSAA's annual All-Sports Award standings (a.k.a. the Floyd E. Lay Sunshine Cup). The school won the Tampa Tribune Athletic Program of the Year award in 2003–2004, and the St. Petersburg Times Athletic Program of the Year award in 2004–2005. Jesuit teams have combined to win 26 state titles in eight sports: soccer (7), baseball (5), cross country (4), basketball (3), swimming (3), football (2), and one in both track & field and wrestling, with all but four of these titles occurring since the mid-1990s.

Jesuit also has had 60 individual and relay State Champions in 56 events in swimming, wrestling, track & field, cross country, and tennis. Most recently Jesuit has earned team State Championships in swimming in 2017, 2018, and 2020, along with wrestling and soccer State Championships in 2020 and baseball in 2019. The school has also won two High School National Championships in baseball in 1997 and soccer in 2001, and was undefeated and ranked No. 1 nationally in baseball when the 2020 season was cut short due to COVID-19.

Jesuit's baseball stadium, Paul Straub Field at Hyer Family Park, was voted as the best high school baseball field in the country by the National High School Baseball Coaches Association in 2011. The school's chief sports rival is the Crusaders of nearby Tampa Catholic High School.

== Clubs and extracurricular activities ==
Jesuit has a mandatory service requirement, and its students serve more than 40,000 hours of community service annually. Students are required to meet community service hour requirements for grade-level advancement and graduation, and are able to meet these requirements via service-oriented clubs, such as the Key Club and the Environmental Club.

Jesuit has about 50 student clubs and organizations. The Speech and Debate Club has sent seven members to Chicago and a policy team to district nationals twice. Other clubs include SADD, National Honor Society, language honor societies, Agmen Christi, Don't Feed the Artists, the "Jesuit Masque" drama troupe, and the Tiger newspaper and yearbook. The school spirit club is named the Blue Tide.

== Facilities ==
To the north of the chapel are the cafeteria, fine arts building, and Jesuit residence. Classroom buildings surround the remaining sides of the chapel. The gymnasium, nicknamed the "Tiger Palace", can has a seating capacity of 1,400. The southeast portion of the campus contains the renovated athletic center, which was dedicated and Major League Baseball Hall of Famer Al López and Jesuit alumni. The library is dedicated to Fr. Richard Hartnett, S.J. Recently, the chapel has been replaced by a larger one and plans are complete for a $35 million multipurpose building, with a cafeteria and arts and theater rooms.

== Alumni ==
Jesuit alumni have become well known in a variety of fields, including politics, ministry, education, medicine, journalism, science, law, professional athletics, writing, acting, painting, engineering, entrepreneurship, and, according to Nick Suszynski, 15 judges. The Alumni Association commonly refers to the high school as "Tampa's largest fraternity".

=== Education, science, and medicine ===
- Michael W. Doyle, international relations scholar and Columbia University professor
- John M. Kovac, astronomer at Harvard–Smithsonian Center for Astrophysics; led the BICEP2 team that discovered the apparent existence of primordial gravitational waves
- Lt. Gen. Douglas Robb, Joint Staff Surgeon, Office of the chairman, Joint Chiefs of Staff at The Pentagon

=== Entertainment ===
- Bert Kreischer, comedian
- Bernie Mac, American stand-up comedian, actor and film producer
- Lionel, nationally syndicated talk radio personality
- Joe Malenko (a.k.a. Jody Simon), former pro wrestler in the WCW, ECW and UWF; son of Boris "The Great Malenko"

=== Government ===
- Philip Agee, CIA officer
- Jim Davis, US Congressman
- Charles R. Wilson, circuit judge, US Court of Appeals for the Eleventh Circuit

==== Baseball ====
- Pete Alonso, MLB first baseman for the Baltimore Orioles
- Jack Anderson, MLB pitcher with the Boston Red Sox
- Sam Dyson, former MLB relief pitcher
- Tommy Eveld, baseball player
- Joe Hudson, former MLB catcher with the Los Angeles Angels
- Al López, former MLB player, manager, all-star, and 1977 Hall of Famer
- Dave Magadan, former MLB player, 1986–2001; MLB coach: 2002–19
- Sam Marsonek, former MLB pitcher with the New York Yankees
- Lance McCullers Jr., current MLB starting pitcher for the Houston Astros and 2017 World Series champion.
- Jason Michaels, former MLB player from 2001 to 2011
- Camden Minacci, professional baseball pitcher in the Los Angeles Angels organization.
- Lou Piniella, 1969 American League Rookie of the Year and 1990 World Series winning manager
- Kevin Quackenbush, current MLB relief pitcher for the Los Angeles Dodgers
- Brad Radke, former MLB pitcher with the Minnesota Twins
- Shane Robinson, former MLB player with the New York Yankees
- Terry Rupp, former college baseball coach and 1998 NCAA Division II Baseball Championship winner
- Ken Suarez, former MLB player, 1966–73
- Marc Valdes, former MLB pitcher, 1995–2001

==== Football ====
- Anthony Allen, former NFL and CFL running back, and Super Bowl XLVII champion.
- Xavier Beitia, former AFL and NFL Europe kicker
- Dane Belton, current NFL player for the New York Giants
- Troy Bowles, current college football linebacker for the Michigan Wolverines
- Malik Davis, current NFL player for the Dallas Cowboys
- Jay Feely, former NFL kicker, 2001–14 and sportscaster for CBS Sports.
- Leonard George, first ever African-American football player scholarship holder at the University of Florida
- George Godsey, current NFL assistant coach and former Georgia Tech quarterback
- Chris Martin, former NFL player with the Chicago Bears
- Rich McKay, current NFL executive, 1993–present
- Garrett Rivas, former AFL kicker
- Garrison Sanborn, former NFL player with the San Francisco 49ers
- Vincent Testaverde Jr., professional football quarterback
- Robert Weiner, former high school football coach and current Toledo co-offensive coordinator.
- Wade Woodaz, college football linebacker for the Clemson Tigers

==== Other sports ====
- Joie Chitwood III, former President of both the Daytona International Speedway and the Indianapolis Motor Speedway
- Mark Dickson, former ATP tennis player and four-time All-American at Clemson University
- Joe Donoho, former professional soccer player for FC Tampa Bay

=== Miscellaneous ===
- Jules Dervaes, urban farmer and leader of California's urban homesteading movement
- Frank Llaneza, cigar maker
- C. Michael Petters, President and CEO of Huntington Ingalls Industries.

== See also ==
- List of Jesuit sites
