= London Action Plan =

Spam enforcement cooperation movement

London Action Plan is a movement to endorse worldwide spam enforcement cooperation and address unnecessary email-related problems, such as online fraud and deception, phishing, and distribution of internet viruses. The members also start the Action Plan for contribution by other interested administration and community agencies, and by proper personal sector council, as a way to develop the network of entities engaged in spam enforcement cooperation.

== Background ==
On October 11, 2004, government and communal agencies from 27 nations accountable for implementing rules in relation to spam met in London to talk about global spam enforcement assistance. At this gathering, a wide range of spam enforcement organizations, plus data guard agencies, telecommunications groups and shopper protection companies, convened to chat about international spam enforcement cooperation. Numerous private sector representatives also acted as a team in fractions of the gathering.
