= Inwood Laboratories, Inc. v. Ives Laboratories, Inc. =

- Supreme Court of the United States

Argued February 22, 1982 Decided June 1, 1982
- Full case name: Inwood Laboratories, Inc., et al. v. Ives Laboratories, Inc.
- Citations: 456 U.S. 844 (more) 102 S. Ct. 2182; 72 L. Ed. 2d 606; 1982 U.S. LEXIS 113; 50 U.S.L.W. 4592; 214 U.S.P.Q. (BNA) 1; 34 Fed. R. Serv. 2d (Callaghan) 1101

Court membership
- Chief Justice Warren E. Burger Associate Justices William J. Brennan Jr. · Byron White; Thurgood Marshall · Harry Blackmun; Lewis F. Powell Jr. · William Rehnquist; John P. Stevens · Sandra Day O'Connor

Case opinions
- Majority: O'Connor, joined by Burger, Brennan, Blackmun, Powell, Stevens
- Concurrence: White, joined by Marshall
- Concurrence: Rehnquist

Laws applied
- Lanham Act

Inwood Laboratories Inc. v. Ives Laboratories, Inc., 456 U.S. 844 (1982), is a United States Supreme Court case, in which the Court confirmed the application of and set out a test for contributory trademark liability under § 32 of the Lanham Act (15 U.S.C. § 1114).

== Background ==
=== Contributory trademark infringement ===
Under the Lanham Act, an owner of a trademark is permitted to sue anyone who uses a mark that is identical or confusingly similar to the trademark owner's mark or who otherwise makes deceptive claims of origin. The Lanham Act does not explicitly provide a cause of action for contributory infringement. Thus, contributory trademark infringement is a judicial doctrine based on the common law of torts. Specifically, contributory liability is based on the principle that parties should be held liable for their contribution to a harm, even when they did not directly cause the harm.

The Supreme Court first recognized the doctrine of contributory infringement in 1924, in William R. Warner & Co. v. Eli Lilly & Co. In this case, the salesmen for the defendant, a manufacturer, suggested to retail dealers that defendant's product could be imperceptibly substituted for the plaintiff's product. Despite the fact that the manufacturer itself did not use plaintiff's mark and the retail dealers were not deceived, the Court found liability, stating: "The wrong was in designedly enabling the dealers to palm off the preparation as that of the respondent."

=== Facts ===
The plaintiff, Ives Laboratories, Inc., owned a patent on the drug cyclendelate, which it distributed in colored blue and blue-red capsules and marketed under the name Cyclospasmol. After the patent expired in 1972, the defendant, Inwood Laboratories, Inc., and other manufacturers began to make and distribute generic versions of the drug using identically colored capsules. Ives sued several manufacturers and wholesalers under § 32 of the Lanham Act, alleging that some pharmacists were distributing generic versions of cyclendelate and mislabeling them as Cyclospasmol. Ives argued that the generic manufacturers' use of identical capsules induced the pharmacists to substitute and mislabel generic versions of the drug as Cyclospasmol, and that pharmacists would continue to make such infringing substitutions as long as the nearly identical generic versions were available.

=== Prior procedural history ===
The Federal District Court denied Ives' request for a preliminary injunction on the sale of drugs that appear identical to Ives' Cyclospasmol, as Ives did not demonstrate that the manufacturers had conspired with the pharmacists to commit the infringement or suggested that the pharmacists make substitutions. The Court of Appeals for the Second Circuit affirmed the decision, but noted that the District Court's standard for contributory infringement was too narrow. Instead, the Court of Appeals stated that a manufacturer or distributor could be held liable for infringement if they suggested that the pharmacists engaged in such infringing conduct, or if they continued to sell the generic drug to retailers whom they knew or had reason to know were engaging in infringing practices.

== Opinion ==
=== Majority opinion ===
The question before the Court was whether the manufacturer could be held liable for trademark infringement when it was the distributors of those drugs (the pharmacists) who actually committed the infringing acts. In an opinion written by Justice Sandra Day O'Connor, the Court agreed with the lower courts that "liability for trademark infringement can extend beyond those who actually mislabel goods with the mark of another." The Supreme Court found that a manufacturer or distributor may be held liable for contributory trademark infringement where it "intentionally induces another to infringe a trademark, or if it continues to supply its product to one whom it knows or has reason to know is engaging in trademark infringement."

The majority of the opinion deals with the Circuit Court overstepping its role of appellate review, as it was to review the District Court's findings under the "clearly erroneous" standard of Rule 52(a) of the Federal Rules of Civil Procedure. The Court stated that an appellate court could not interpret the evidence on its own in place of the district court's findings, as the trier of fact has the exclusive responsibility of determining the weight and credibility of the evidence.

The Court reversed the Court of Appeals' finding of infringement of § 32 of the Lanham Act, and remanded the case to the Court of Appeals for the Second Circuit for further proceedings, as the Circuit Court had not considered the rest of Ives' claims.

=== Definition of functionality ===
Although its opinion in Inwood did not deal much with the issue of functionality, the Court gave a definition of functionality in Footnote 10 that it has referred back to in more recent cases. One of Inwood's defenses to Ives' infringement action was that the color of the capsules was functional. In Footnote 10, the Supreme Court discussed that defense, stating: "In general terms, a product feature is functional if it is essential to the use or purpose of the article or if it affects the cost or quality of the article." The Court cited Sears, Roebuck & Co. v. Stiffel Co., 376 U.S. 225, 232 (1964) and Kellogg Co. v. National Biscuit Co., 305 U.S. 111, 122 (1938) as support. For a number of years, lower courts wrestled with how to reconcile the Inwood definition with prior case law, with some ignoring it altogether and others blending the Inwood test with other case law. In Qualitex Co. v. Jacobson Products Co., the Court reiterated this Inwood test for functionality, along with additional language, demonstrating that Inwood formulation of the functionality test should not be dismissed merely as dicta. The Court also reiterated the test in TrafFix Devices v. Mktg Displays, 532 U.S. 159 (1995).

Justice White included another definition of the functionality standard in his concurrence, stating: "A functional characteristic is 'an important ingredient in the commercial success of the product." Furthermore, Justice White concluded that the defendant should bear the burden of proof for functionality.

== Cases extending Inwood ==
Inwood involved a manufacturer or distributor, but it left open whether its test of contributory liability applied beyond this context. Since Inwood, courts have extended the application of contributory infringement to other areas, including flea markets, franchises, and service providers
