= Supplemental Register =

In United States trademark law, the Supplemental Register is the secondary register of trademarks maintained by the United States Patent and Trademark Office. It was established in 1946 by Subchapter II of the Lanham Act, to allow the domestic registration of trademarks that do not meet all the requirements for registration on the Principal Register, so that the holder(s) of such a mark could register it in another country. This was necessary because under the Paris Convention for the Protection of Industrial Property foreign registration was not permitted in the absence of domestic registration, and the trademark laws of countries outside the U.S. often have less stringent registration requirements for marks.

The only requirement for registration on the Supplemental Register is that a mark be capable of distinguishing goods or services, not that it actually serve such a function.

Owners of the registrations on the Supplemental Register are still permitted to sue for trademark infringement in federal court based upon their statutory rights created by owning a federal registration, but must prove that the registered term actually functions as mark. Unlike a mark registered on the Principal Register, the Supplemental Registration provides no evidence of trademark rights in the registered term in a court proceeding.

The supplemental registration is contestable, i.e., it may be cancelled if a third party proves earlier use or superior rights.

A Supplemental Register listing does not in itself provide evidence that the listed mark is actually a trademark for purposes of the Uniform Domain-Name Dispute-Resolution Policy (UDRP).
