= Trademark infringement =

Violation of trademark rights

Trademark infringement is a violation of the exclusive rights attached to a trademark without the authorization of the trademark owner or any licensees (provided that such authorization was within the scope of the licence). Infringement may occur when one party, the "infringer", uses a trademark which is identical or confusingly similar to a trademark owned by another party, especially in relation to products or services which are identical or similar to the products or services which the registration covers. An owner of a trademark may commence civil legal proceedings against a party which infringes its registered trademark. In the United States, the Trademark Counterfeiting Act of 1984 criminalized the intentional trade in counterfeit goods and services.

If the respective marks and products or services are entirely dissimilar, trademark infringement may still be established if the registered mark is well known pursuant to the Paris Convention. In the United States, a cause of action for use of a mark for such dissimilar services is called trademark dilution.

In some jurisdictions a party other than the owner (e.g., a licensee) may be able to pursue trademark infringement proceedings against an infringer if the owner fails to do so.

== Likelihood of confusion ==
Section 32 of the Lanham Act states that those who use similar or identical trademarks, products, or services, to those already registered with the USPTO in such a way as "likely to cause confusion, . . . cause mistake, or to deceive. . . shall be liable in a civil action by the registrant . . . ." Where the respective marks, products, or services are not identical, similarity will generally be assessed by reference to whether there is a likelihood of confusion that consumers will believe the products or services originated from the trademark owner.

=== Likelihood of confusion factors ===
A typical likelihood of confusion test balances a variety of factors, none of which is dispositive on its own. While each jurisdiction uses a slightly different test, every test considers (1) whether and to what extent the alleged infringer intended to infringe on the senior user's valid trademark rights, (2) evidence of any consumer confusion, and (3) factors that speak to the economic relationship between the consuming public and the two marks, products, or services.

Circuit Court	Illustrative Cases	Likelihood of Confusion Factors
1st Circuit	Boston Athletic Ass’n v. Sullivan, 867 F.2d 22, 29-34 (1st Cir. 1989) Keds Corp. v. Renee Int’l Trading Corp., 888 F.2d 215 (1st Cir. 1989)	1. the similarity of the marks; 2. the similarity of the goods; 3. the relationship between the parties’ channels of trade; 4. the relationship between the parties’ advertising; 5. the classes of prospective purchasers; 6. evidence of actual confusion; 7. the defendant's intent in adopting its mark; and 8. the strength of the plaintiff's mark.
2nd Circuit	Polaroid Corp. v. Polarad Electronics Corp., 287 F.2d 492 (2d Cir. 1961), cert. denied, 368 U.S. 820 (1961) Playtex Products, Inc. v. Georgia-Pacific Corp., 390 F.3d 158 (2d Cir. 2004)	1. the strength of the plaintiff's mark 2. the similarity of the parties' marks 3. the proximity of the parties' marks in the marketplace 4. the likelihood the plaintiff will "bridge the gap" between the products 5. actual consumer confusion between the marks 6. the defendant's intent in adopting its mark 7. the quality of the defendant's product 8. the sophistication of the relevant consumer group; These are often referred to as the "Polaroid" Factors.
3rd Circuit	Interpace Corp. v. Lapp, Inc., 721 F.2d 460 (3d Cir. 1983); KOS Pharmaceuticals, Inc. v. Andrx Corp., 369 F.3d 700 (3d Cir. 2004).	1. the degree of similarity between the owner's mark and the alleged infringing mark; 2. the strength of the owner's mark; 3. the price of the goods and other factors indicative of the care and attention expected of consumers when making a purchase; 4. the length of time the defendant has used the mark without evidence of actual confusion arising; 5. the intent of the defendant in adopting the mark; 6. the evidence of actual confusion; 7. whether the goods, though not competing, are marketed through the same channels of trade and advertised through the same media; 8. the extent to which the targets of the parties’ sales efforts are the same; 9. the relationship of the goods in the minds of consumers because of the similarity of function; and 10. other facts suggesting that the consuming public might expect the prior owner to manufacture a product in the defendant's market, or that he is likely to expand into that market.; These are often referred to as the "Lapp" Factors.
4th Circuit	Pizzeria Uno Corp. v. Temple, 747 F.2d 1522 (4th Cir. 1984); CareFirst of Maryland, Inc. v. First Care, P.C., 434 F.3d 263 (4th Cir. 2006).: However, Sara Lee Corp. v. Kayser-Roth Corp., 81 F.3d 455 (4th Cir. 1996) holds that courts may consider factors not included in Pizzaria Uno.	1. the strength or distinctiveness of the mark; 2. the similarity of the two marks; 3. the similarity of the goods/services the marks identify; 4. the similarity of the facilities the two parties use in their businesses; 5. the similarity of the advertising used by the two parties; 6. the defendant's intent; and 7. actual confusion; These are often referred to as the "Pizzeria Uno" Factors.
5th Circuit	Roto-Rooter Corp. v. O’Neal, 513 F.2d 44, 45 (5th Cir. 1975); Scott Fetzer Co. v. House of Vacuums Inc., 381 F.3d 477 (5th Cir. 2004): However, the court in Oreck Corp. v. U.S. Floor Systems, Inc., 803 F.2d 166 (5th Cir. 1986) held that courts should apply a test utilizing eight factors.	1. the type of mark allegedly infringed; 2. the similarity between the two marks; 3. the similarity of the products or services; 4. the identity of the retail outlets and purchasers; 5. the identity of the advertising media used; 6. the defendant's intent; and 7. any evidence of actual confusion
6th Circuit	Frisch's Restaurants v. Elby's Big Boy, 670 F.2d 642 (6th Cir. 1982), cert. denied, 459 U.S. 916 (1982); AutoZone, Inc. v. Tandy Corp., 373 F.3d 786 (6th Cir. 2004)	1. the strength of the plaintiff's mark; 2. the relatedness of the goods or services offered by the parties; 3. the similarity of the marks; 4. any evidence of actual confusion; 5. the marketing channels used by the parties; 6. the probable degree of purchaser care and sophistication; 7. the defendant's intent; and 8. the likelihood of either party expanding its product line using the marks; These are often referred to as the "Frisch's" Factors.
7th Circuit	Helene Curtis Indus., Inc. v. Church & Dwight Co., 560 F.2d 1325, 1330 (7th Cir. 1977), cert. denied, 434 U.S. 1070 (1978); Sullivan v. CBS Corp., 385 F.3d 772 (7th Cir. 2004)	1. the similarity of the marks; 2. the similarity of the products; 3. the area and manner of concurrent use; 4. the degree of care likely to be used by consumers; 5. the strength of the plaintiff's mark; 6. evidence of actual confusion; 7. the defendant's intent to palm off its goods as those of the plaintiff
8th Circuit	SquirtCo v. Seven-Up Co., 628 F.2d 1086 (8th Cir. 1980); Frosty Treats Inc. v. Sony Computer Entm't Am., Inc., 426 F.3d 1001 (8th Cir. 2005)	1. the strength of the owner's mark; 2. the similarity between the owner's mark and the alleged infringer's mark; 3. the degree to which the products compete with each other; 4. he alleged infringer's intent to “pass off” its goods as those of the trademark owner; 5. incidents of actual confusion; and 6. the type of product, its costs, and conditions of purchase; These are often referred to as the "SquirtCo" Factors.
9th Circuit	AMF, Inc. v. Sleekcraft Boats, 599 F.2d 341 (9th Cir. 1979)	1. the strength of the mark; 2. the proximity of the goods; 3. the similarity of the marks; 4. the evidence of actual confusion; 5. the marketing channels used; 6. the type of goods and the degree of care likely to be exercised by the purchaser; 7. the defendant's intent in selecting the mark; and 8. the likelihood of expansion of the product lines.; These are often referred to as the "Sleekcraft" Factors.
10th Circuit	Sally Beauty Co. v. Beautyco, Inc., 304 F.3d 964 (10th Cir. 2002) Australian Gold, Inc. v. Hatfield, 436 F.3d 1228 (10th Cir. 2006)	1. the degree of similarity between the marks; 2. the intent of the alleged infringer in adopting its mark; 3. evidence of actual confusion; 4. the relation in the use and the manner of marketing between the goods or services marketed by the competing parties; 5. the degree of care likely to be exercised by purchasers; and 6. the strength or weakness of the marks
11th Circuit	AmBrit, Inc. v. Kraft, Inc., 812 F.2d 1531 (11th Cir. 1986) Dippin’ Dots, Inc. v. Frosty Bites Distribution, LLC, 369 F.3d 1197 (11th Cir. 2004)	1. the strength of the marks 2. the similarity of the marks 3. the similarity of the products 4. the similarity of retail outlets and purchasers 5. the similarity of advertising media used; 6. the defendant's intent; and 7. actual confusion
D.C. Circuit	Partido Revolucionario Dominicano (PRD) Seccional Metropolitana de Washington-DC, Maryland y Virginia v. Partido Revolucionario Dominicano, Seccional de Maryland y Virginia, 312 F. Supp. 2d 1 (D.D.C. 2004)	1. the strength of the plaintiff's mark; 2. the degree of similarity between the two marks; 3. the proximity of the products; 4. evidence of actual confusion; 5. the defendants' purpose or reciprocal of good faith in adopting its own mark; 6. the quality of defendants' product; and 7. the sophistication of the buyers
Federal Circuit	In re E. I. Du Pont de Nemours & Co., 476 F.2d 1357 (C.C.P.A. 1973) Palm Bay Imports, Inc. v. Veuve Clicquot Ponsardin Maison Fondee En 1772, 396 F.3d 1369 (Fed. Cir. 2005)	1. The similarity or dissimilarity of the marks in their entireties as to appearance, sound, connotation and commercial impression; 2. the similarity or dissimilarity and nature of the goods or services as described in an application or registration or in connection with which a prior mark is in use; 3. the similarity or dissimilarity of established, likely-to-continue trade channels; 4. the conditions under which and buyers to whom sales are made, i.e., “impulse” vs. careful, sophisticated purchasing; 5. the fame of the prior mark (sales, advertising, length of use); 6. the number and nature of similar marks in use on similar goods; 7. the nature and extent of any actual confusion; 8. the length of time during and conditions under which there has been concurrent use without evidence of actual confusion; 9. the variety of goods on which a mark is or is not used (house mark, “family” mark, product mark); 10. the market interface between applicant and the owner of a prior mark: (a) a mere consent to register or use; (b) agreement provisions designed to preclude confusion, i.e. limitations on continued use of themarks by each party; (c) assignment of the mark, application, registration and good will of the related business; (d) laches and estoppel attributable to owner of prior park and indicative of lack of confusion; 11. the extent to which applicant has a right to exclude others from use of its mark on its goods; 12. the extent of potential confusion, i.e., whether de minimis or substantial; and 13. any other established fact probative of the effect of use

The most famous of the foregoing tests is the one employed by the United States Court of Appeals for the Federal Circuit (the "DuPont" Factors). However, this is because it is the test used by USPTO when assessing the registrability of a mark upon application. In any legal action for trademark infringement in the United States, the court will apply the test of the circuit in which it is located.

=== Types of confusion ===
Courts assess likelihood of confusion in various contexts, including prior to the sale (also known as initial interest confusion), at the point of sale, and post-sale. Confusion may also be direct or reverse, depending on who the senior and junior user of the marks are.

==== Point-of-sale confusion ====
The most typical form of trademark infringement is point-of-sale confusion, which occurs when a consumer mistakenly believes that their product or service is from a company or brand in which it is not. This type of infringement involves a defendant "passing off" a good or service utilizing a trademark that belongs to the plaintiff, usually with the intent of deceiving consumers into thinking that the good or service originated with the plaintiff.

For example, in McDonald's Corp. v. Druck and Gerner, D.D.S., P.C., McDonald's sued McDental, a dental services provider operated by two dentists, for trademark infringement. McDonald's presented evidence that it owned trademark rights in a family of marks beginning with the prefix “Mc,” that there was widespread public familiarity with that family of marks, and that survey evidence established that confusion was likely to occur from the use of the McDental name. McDental's owners denied any intention to evoke McDonald's marks in their adoption of the McDental name, alleging that they had never perceived or heard anyone else perceive an association between the two marks. The United States District Court for the Northern District of New York found that the similarity between the McDental name and McDonald's family of brands beginning with “Mc” was obvious. The court held that McDonald's had shown that a likelihood of confusion existed, warranting the issuance of an injunction.

==== Initial interest confusion ====
Initial interest confusion occurs when an allegedly improper use of a trademark attracts potential purchasers to consider products or services provided by the infringer (bait-and-switch). Under the Lanham Act, a plaintiff may bring a trademark infringement claim against a defendant for creating consumer confusion prior to the point of sale, even if the consumer confusion is resolved before the sale goes through.

For example, in Playboy Enterprises, Inc. v. Netscape Communications Corp., Playboy sued Netscape for selling banner ads using trademarked terms "playboy" and "playmate." The United States Court of Appeals for the Ninth Circuit held that Playboy was likely to show that consumers may be attracted to competitors' products by free riding Playboy's reputation when using the trademarks "playboy" and "playmate", even if the consumers are well aware that they are not buying services from Playboy.

==== Post-sale confusion ====
Post-sale confusion occurs when the use of a trademark leads individuals of the general public (other than the purchaser) to mistakenly believe that a product was manufactured by the trademark holder. Thus, for the purposes of a likelihood of confusion analysis, the relevant audience may not be the targeted purchasers at all, but rather the general public, otherwise known as the "person on the street."

As articulated by the United States Court of Appeals for the Second Circuit, trademark law protects the public from incurring harms caused by post-sale confusion: "Trademark laws exists to protect the public from confusion. The creation of confusion in the post-sale context can be harmful in that if there are too many knockoffs in the market, sales of the original may decline because the public is fearful that what they are purchasing may not be an original. Furthermore, the public may be deceived in the resale market if it requires expertise to distinguish between an original and a knockoff."

For example, in Ferrari S.P.A. Esercizio v. Roberts, Ferrari S.P.A. Esercizio, a luxury-automobile manufacturer with a reputation for producing exclusive vehicles with distinctive designs, brought a trademark infringement suit against Carl Roberts after Roberts began manufacturing and selling kits that would allow budget-conscious car enthusiasts to copy the exterior designs of Ferrari (e.g., the Daytona Spyder, the Testarossa) onto the undercarriage of less expensive vehicles. Although Roberts has shown that confusion did not exist at the point of sale, the United States Court of Appeals for the Sixth Circuit concluded that allowing the kits to enter into commerce would dilute the Ferrari brand by diminishing the perceived exclusivity and quality that make the Daytona Spyder and Testarossa attractive to consumers. The court further held that the kits were designed to perfectly replicate the exterior of Ferrari's vehicles, and there was a strong likelihood of post-sale customer confusion. The Sixth Circuit held that Roberts's kits infringed upon the distinctive trade dress of Ferrari's vehicles, and a permanent injunction against Roberts was affirmed.

==== Direct confusion ====
Direct confusion occurs when consumers believe that the goods or services of a later (junior) trademark user come from, or are sponsored by, the prior (senior) trademark holder. In cases of direct confusion, the junior user is said to free ride on the reputation and goodwill of the senior user. Direct confusion typically occurs if the senior user is a much larger or better-known producer than the junior user.

==== Reverse confusion ====
Reverse confusion occurs if consumers incorrectly think that a later (junior) trademark user is the source of the prior (senior) trademark user's products or services. Reverse confusion typically occurs if the junior user is a much larger or better-known producer than the senior user.

Reverse-confusion claims exist to prevent big companies from stealing marks or brands from existing, smaller companies. Factors contributing to a likelihood of reverse confusion include: (1) similarity between the senior and junior user's marks, (2) the conceptual strength or uniqueness of the senior user's mark and the commercial strength or public awareness of the junior user's mark, (3) consumer attentiveness to the product, (4) the length of time junior user has used the mark without causing confusion, (5) whether the junior user intended to cause confusion, (6) evidence of actual confusion, (7) trade and advertising channels for the competing products, (8) the similarity of the manufacturers’ sales efforts, (9) the competing products’ similarity in the minds of consumers, and (10) facts suggesting that consumers would expect the junior user to manufacture both products or expand into the senior user's market.

== Contributory infringement ==
The Supreme Court first held that liability for trademark infringement could extend beyond direct infringers in Inwood Laboratories, Inc. v. Ives Laboratories, Inc. The Supreme Court articulated the following standard for contributory infringement: "If a manufacturer or distributor intentionally induces another to infringe a trademark, or if it continues to supply its product to one whom it knows or has reason to know is engaging in trademark infringement, the manufacturer or distributor is contributorily liable for any harm as a result of the deceit."

For example, in Fonovisa, Inc. v. Cherry Auction, Inc., the United States Court of Appeals for the Ninth Circuit imposed secondary liability on a flea market landlord who provided the “necessary marketplace” for the sale of infringing goods. The court held that contributory trademark infringement existed because the landlord was willfully blind to its tenant's ongoing infringement.

== Defenses ==
The party accused of infringement may be able to defeat infringement proceedings if it can establish a valid exception (e.g., comparative advertising) or defense (e.g., laches) to infringement, or attack and cancel the underlying registration (e.g., for non-use) upon which the proceedings are based. Other defenses include fraud, genericness, functionality, abandonment, or fair use.

=== Exceptions ===
==== Comparative advertising ====
Comparative advertising occurs when one party uses another party's trademark to refer to the trademark owner or its goods or services. The Federal Trade Commission allows comparative advertising where the bases of the comparison are truthful, non-deceptive, and clearly specified. The user of the trademark cannot imply or suggest sponsorship, endorsement, or affiliation by the mark owner. If the user uses the trademark in a way that does not confuse or mislead consumers and only uses as much of the mark as necessary for identification (e.g., use of the words but not use of the same font or graphics), then this may be considered fair use.

=== Defenses ===
==== Laches ====
Laches is an equitable defense. The doctrine applies when a defendant affirmatively establishes: (1) knowledge by the plaintiff of facts constituting a cause of action or a reasonable opportunity to discover such facts; (2) an undue delay by the plaintiff in commencing an action; and (3) damage to the defendant resulting from the delay in bringing the action.

==== Fraud ====
A viable defense to trademark infringement may assert "[t]hat the registration or the incontestable right to use the mark was obtained fraudulently."

A defense of fraud by the trademark owner can be raised at any time, and includes proving that: (1) the applicant made a false representation to USPTO; (2) the false representation is material to the registrability of a mark; (3) the applicant had knowledge of the falsity; and (4) the applicant made representation with the intent to deceive the USPTO.

==== Genericness ====
Trademarks that evolve over time into a generic term for a class of items, rather than remaining a source-identifying distinctive term, may lose trademark status. Genericide is a doctrine in which a formerly-protectable mark is held to be unprotectable because it no longer signifies the source or producer of the product (e.g., Aspirin as a product made by Bayer) but instead a category or genus of product (aspirin as pain reliever that a generic manufacturer can call their product).

A genericness argument alleges that a formerly-protectable mark has become generic in a specific market or industry as signifying not the producer but a category or genus of product.

==== Functionality ====
The functionality doctrine states that functional product features cannot be trademarked. Functionality is a recognized defense to trademark infringement in U.S. law. This defense prevents trademark protection from overriding patent protection by ensuring that no mark can be registered if it is functional as a whole.

For example, in Valu Engineering, Inc. v. Rexnord Corp., the court decided that certain conveyor belt shapes were functional due to their increased performance over alternative designs and were therefore not eligible to be considered a trademark.

The Supreme Court has held that a product is functional if:

(1) it is essential to the use or purpose of the article, or if it affects the cost or quality of the article; OR

(2) the exclusive use of the functional feature would put competitors at a significant disadvantage.

==== Abandonment ====
Abandonment of a trademark occurs when the owner of the trademark deliberately ceases to use the trademark for three or more years, with no intention of using the trademark again in the future. When a trademark is abandoned, the trademark owner may no longer claim rights to the trademark. In effect, this frees the trademark so that anyone else can use it without recourse from the original trademark owner.

==== Fair use ====
The Lanham Act's fair-use exception is an affirmative defense requiring the defendant to prove that the term was used in good faith and in a descriptive manner for a purpose other than as a mark. The Lanham Act includes a fair-use exception, under § 1115(b)(4), for trademarks that consist of descriptive words, to prevent trademark monopolies over the use of descriptive terms.

There are two types of fair use, descriptive fair use and nominative fair use.

Descriptive fair use allows a third party to use another party's descriptive trademark to describe its own product or service. In order to successfully assert a fair-use defense to a trademark infringement claim, the defendant must prove the three elements of the fair-use doctrine: (1) that the term was used in a way other than as a mark; (2) that the term was used to describe the goods or services offered or their geographic origin; and (3) that the use had been undertaken in good faith.

Nominative fair use allows third parties to use another party's trademark to refer to that party's actual product or service. The use must not create a likelihood of confusion and cannot imply sponsorship or endorsement by the trademark owner where none exists.

== Remedies ==
=== Injunctive relief ===
Injunctions are court orders commanding that the infringer immediately cease its unlawful activities. A plaintiff will be entitled to injunctive relief for trademark infringement if they show probable success on the merits and the possibility of irreparable injury.

=== Monetary relief ===
Pursuant to 15 U.S.C. § 1117(a), a plaintiff can recover the infringer's profits, any damages sustained, and the costs of the action. In assessing profits, the brand owner must prove only the gross amount of the defendant's sales. Thereafter, the defendant has the burden of providing evidence of any amount that should be deducted.

An accounting of profits is proper in a trademark infringement case only where the defendant engages in willful infringement, meaning that the defendant attempted to exploit the value of an established name of another. Alternatively, a plaintiff may recover damages incurred if they show a reasonable forecast of lost profits.

== Globally ==
The ACTA trade agreement, signed in May 2011 by the United States, Japan, Switzerland, and the EU, requires that its parties add criminal penalties, including incarceration and fines, for copyright and trademark infringement, and obligated the parties to actively police for infringement.

In many countries with common law, a trademark which is not registered cannot be "infringed" as such, and the trademark owner cannot bring infringement proceedings under statute. Instead, the owner may be able to commence proceedings under the common law for passing off or misrepresentation, or under more general legislation which prohibits unfair business practices. In some jurisdictions, infringement of trade dress may also be actionable.

== Notable cases ==
- Facebook, Inc. v. Power Ventures, Inc.
- Google, Inc. v. American Blind & Wallpaper Factory, Inc., in which Google's AdWords program was alleged to be in violation of trademark
- Rescuecom Corp. v. Google Inc., in which the use of trademarks in Google's AdWords program was found to be a "use in commerce" under the Lanham Act
- Network Automation, Inc. v. Advanced Systems Concepts, Inc., in which the use of a competitor's trademark as an Internet advertisement search keyword was found to not constitute trademark infringement
- College Network, Inc. v. Moore Educational Publishers, Inc., in which the use of a competitor's trademark does not qualify as a "use in commerce" is upheld
- Polaroid Corp. v. Polarad Elects.
- Inwood Laboratories, Inc. v. Ives Laboratories, Inc.
- Mickey SRL. v. The Walt Disney Company
- TAPE Inc. v. Tito Sotto, Vic Sotto, and Joey de Leon (TVJ)

== See also ==
- Madrid Protocol
- Canadian trademark law
- Exhaustion of rights
- Passing off
- Trade dress
- Patent infringement
- Copyright infringement
- Brand protection
- SAD Scheme
- Zombie trademark
