= Lanham Act =

United States trademark law

- Other short titles: Trademark Act of 1946

Citations
- Statutes at Large: 60 Stat. 427

Codification
- Titles amended: 15

Legislative history
- Signed into law by President Harry S. Truman on July 5, 1946

United States Supreme Court cases
- Steele v. Bulova Watch Co., 344 U.S. 280 (1952); Fleischmann Distilling Corp. v. Maier Brewing Co., 386 U.S. 714 (1967); Inwood Laboratories, Inc. v. Ives Laboratories, Inc., 456 U.S. 844 (1982); Park 'N Fly, Inc. v. Dollar Park & Fly, Inc., 469 U.S. 189 (1985); San Francisco Arts & Athletics, Inc. v. United States Olympic Committee, 483 U.S. 522 (1987); Two Pesos, Inc. v. Taco Cabana, Inc., 505 U.S. 763 (1992); Qualitex Co. v. Jacobson Products Co., 514 U.S. 159 (1995); College Savings Bank v. Florida Prepaid Postsecondary Education Expense Board, 527 U.S. 666 (1999); TrafFix Devices, Inc. v. Marketing Displays, Inc., 532 U.S. 23 (2001); Moseley v. V Secret Catalogue, Inc., 537 U.S. 418 (2003); Dastar Corp. v. Twentieth Century Fox Film Corp., 539 U.S. 23 (2003); Lexmark International, Inc. v. Static Control Components, Inc., 572 U.S. 118 (2014); POM Wonderful LLC v. Coca-Cola Co., 573 U.S. 102 (2014); B&B Hardware, Inc. v. Hargis Industries, Inc., 575 U.S. 138 (2015); Matal v. Tam, No. 15-1293, 582 U.S. ___ (2017); Iancu v. Brunetti, No. 18-302, 588 U.S. ___ (2019); Romag Fasteners, Inc. v. Fossil, Inc., No. 18-1233, 590 U.S. ___ (2020); Patent and Trademark Office v. Booking.com B. V., No. 19-46, 591 U.S. ___ (2020); Jack Daniel's Properties, Inc. v. VIP Products LLC, No. 22-148, 599 U.S. ___ (2023); Abitron Austria GmbH v. Hetronic International, Inc., No. 21-1043, 600 U.S. ___ (2023); Vidal v. Elster, No. 22-704, 602 U.S. ___ (2024); Dewberry Group v. Dewberry Engineers, No. 23-900, 604 U.S. ___ (2025)

The Lanham (Trademark) Act (Pub. L. 79–489, 60 Stat. 427, enacted July 5, 1946, codified at 15 U.S.C. § 1051 et seq. (15 U.S.C. ch. 22) is the primary federal statute governing trademark law in the United States.

The Lanham Act establishes a national system of trademark registration and grants owners of federally registered trademarks the right to pursue civil remedies for trademark infringement, trademark dilution, cybersquatting, and false advertising.

== History ==
Named for Representative Fritz G. Lanham of Texas, the Act was passed on July 5, 1946, and signed into law by President Harry Truman, taking effect "one year from its enactment", on July 6, 1947. In rare circumstances, a conflict will arise between trademarks that have been in use since before the Lanham Act went into effect, thus requiring the courts to examine the dispute according to the trademark act that existed before the Lanham Act.

Before its enactment, trademarks relied solely on protection under state-level common law. Subsequent federal laws proved ineffective, leading to confusion and inadequate safeguarding of marks. Trademarks persisted indefinitely, even if unused. The Lanham Act emerged as a long-awaited solution, aiming to comprehensively regulate the creation and utilization of trademarks, offering protection to both trademark owners and consumers.

The Act has been amended several times since its enactment. Its impact was significantly enhanced by the Trademark Counterfeiting Act of 1984, which made the intentional use of a counterfeit trademark or the unauthorized use of a counterfeit trademark an offense under Title 18 of the United States Code, and enhanced enforcement remedies through the use of ex parte seizures and the award of treble profits or damages (whichever is greater).

In 1999, the Anticybersquatting Consumer Protection Act inserted 15 U.S.C. § 1125(d), and amended 15 U.S.C. § 1114(2)(D).

=== Civil enforcement ===
§§ 32 and 43 of the Act (now known as 15 U.S.C. §§ 1124–1125) set out the remedies that can be sought when a trademark is infringed. Notably, Section 43(a) of the Lanham Act focuses on false advertising and unfair competition, providing a legal recourse for individuals and businesses. This section enables legal action against those engaging in misleading advertising practices that may cause confusion about the origin of goods or services. A crucial provision within Section 43(a) allows any person who anticipates damage from false advertising to initiate a civil action. These provisions forbid the importation of goods that infringe registered trademarks, and restrict, through the use of injunctions and damages, the use of false descriptions and trademark dilution.

§ 43(a) (15 U.S.C. § 1125(a)) is the "likelihood of confusion" standard for infringement of an unregistered trademark or trade dress, and courts still frequently refer to the provision as "Section 43(a)":

15 U.S.C. § 1125 - False designations of origin, false descriptions, and dilution forbidden

(a) Civil action

- (1) Any person who, on or in connection with any goods or services, or any container for goods, uses in commerce any word, term, name, symbol, or device, or any combination thereof, or any false designation of origin, false or misleading description of fact, or false or misleading representation of fact, which—
  - (A) is likely to cause confusion, or to cause mistake, or to deceive as to the affiliation, connection, or association of such person with another person, or as to the origin, sponsorship, or approval of his or her goods, services, or commercial activities by another person, or
  - (B) in commercial advertising or promotion, misrepresents the nature, characteristics, qualities, or geographic origin of his or her or another person’s goods, services, or commercial activities,
  shall be liable in a civil action by any person who believes that he or she is or is likely to be damaged by such act.

15 U.S.C. § 1125(a)(1)(A) is often used when false or misleading statements are alleged to have hurt a consumer or business. The claimant must prove that a false or misleading statement was made in commerce and that the statement creates a likelihood of harm to the plaintiff.

15 U.S.C. § 1125(a)(1)(B) is often used when false or misleading statements are alleged to have hurt a business.

In 2026, a federal jury in the Southern District of New York found Papaya Gaming liable for false advertising and awarded $420 million in damages to Skillz Inc., in what was described as the largest award under the Lanham Act in U.S. history.

=== Jurisprudence ===
The Act has been held to have extraterritorial impact, and the circuit courts have been giving more favorable interpretations in extending its scope. The original ruling by the Supreme Court of the United States, as interpreted by the United States Court of Appeals for the Second Circuit, contemplates a three-part test in determining whether the Act applies (where at least two factors must be met):

1. the conduct of the defendant must have a substantial effect on United States commerce,
2. the defendant must be a United States citizen, and
3. there must be an absence of conflict with foreign law.

Although the Lanham Act sets out clear parameters as to what constitutes trademark infringement, subsequent court decisions, especially those involving the Internet, have loosened the strictures.

In 2003, the U.S. Supreme Court ruled that the law had no impact on public domain works in Dastar Corp. v. Twentieth Century Fox Film Corp.

In 2014, the various interpretations that had been adopted by the circuit courts as to who had standing to sue under 15 U.S.C. § 1125(a) were ousted by the Court in Lexmark International, Inc. v. Static Control Components, Inc., where Justice Scalia adopted a multi-step approach:

1. Under Article III, the plaintiff must have suffered or be imminently threatened with a concrete and particularized "injury in fact" that is fairly traceable to the challenged action of the defendant and likely to be redressed by a favorable judicial decision.
2. AGC requires the ascertainment, as a matter of statutory interpretation, of the "scope of the private remedy created by" Congress, and the "class of persons who [could] maintain a private damages action under" a legislatively conferred cause of action.
3. A statutory cause of action extends only to plaintiffs whose interests "fall within the zone of interests protected by the law invoked", and the "zone of interests" formulation applies to all statutorily created causes of action, as it is a "requirement of general application" and Congress is presumed to "legislat[e] against the background of" it, "which applies unless it is expressly negated."
4. A statutory cause of action is also presumed to be limited to plaintiffs whose injuries are proximately caused by violations of the statute. A plaintiff suing under §1125(a) ordinarily must show that its economic or reputational injury flows directly from the deception wrought by the defendant's advertising; and that occurs when deception of consumers causes them to withhold trade from the plaintiff.
5. Direct application of the zone-of-interests test and the proximate-cause requirement supplies the relevant limits on who may sue under §1125(a).

In 2014, the U.S. Supreme Court ruled in POM Wonderful LLC v. Coca-Cola Co. that the Act complemented the Food, Drug, and Cosmetic Act, allowing a company to sue for infringement by way of civil action.

In Matal v. Tam (2017), the Supreme Court ruled that a provision in 15 U.S.C. § 1052(a) of the Act, denying registration to any trademarks seen as disparaging an individual or group, was an unconstitutional restriction of applicants' freedom of speech.

In Iancu v. Brunetti (2019), the Supreme Court ruled that a provision in 15 U.S.C. § 1052(a) of the Act, denying registration to any trademarks seen as consisting of immoral or scandalous matter, was an unconstitutional restriction of applicants' freedom of speech.

== Divisions ==
In Title 15 of the United States Code, the Act has been divided into four subchapters:

Subchapter	Name	Sections	Description
I	The Principal Register	§§ 1051–1072	Lanham Act, ss. 1–22
II	The Supplemental Register	§§ 1091–1096	Lanham Act, ss. 23–28
III	General Provisions	§§ 1111–1127	Lanham Act, ss. 29–45
III	General Provisions	§ 1128	later creation of the National Intellectual Property Law Enforcement Coordination Council
III	General Provisions	§ 1129	passage of prohibitions against cyberpiracy originally codified here, but now covered by 15 U.S.C. § 8131
IV	The Madrid Protocol	§§ 1141–1141n	later passage, in consequence of US accession to the Madrid system

=== The Trademark Registers ===
Subchapter I sets forth the requirements that a mark must meet to receive a registration on the Principal Register, which bestows various rights on the trademark owner to prevent others from infringing their mark. Among the requirements are prohibitions against the registration of marks that are confusingly similar to existing marks, are generic or merely descriptive, are scandalous or immoral, or fall onto certain other prohibited categories. Subchapter I also sets forth certain procedural requirements, such as the submission of an affidavit of continued use after five years of registration.

Subchapter II sets forth a form of registration on the Supplemental Register, for certain marks that are unregistrable under Subchapter I, but may become registrable in the future, such as those that are merely descriptive. This form of registration, while not granting all the protections of registration on the Principal Register, does provide notice to potential infringers that the mark is in use, and also provides some procedural benefits.

== See also ==
- International cybercrime
