= Principal Register =

In United States trademark law, the Principal Register is the primary register of trademarks maintained by the United States Patent and Trademark Office. It is governed by Subchapter I of the Lanham Act.

Having a mark registered under the Principal Register confers certain benefits on the holder of the mark. Among them are:

- Nationwide constructive use and constructive notice, which cuts off rights of other users for similar marks
- The possibility of achieving incontestable status after five years (which cuts off certain defenses of potential infringement defendants)
- The right to bring a federal cause of action for infringement without regard to diversity or amount in controversy
- The right to request U.S. Customs and Border Protection officials to bar importation of goods bearing infringing trademarks
- Provisions for treble damages, attorney fees, and various other remedies.

Trademarks must be inherently distinctive, or have acquired sufficient secondary meaning, to be registered on the Principal Register.

== See also ==
- Supplemental Register
