= List of leading trademark case law =

This list contains an alphabetical listing of historically significant or leading case law in the area of United States trademark law. Significant cases are those that establish a legal doctrine, a precedent, or have otherwise had a lasting effect on the application of law

== A ==
- Anheuser-Busch, Inc. v. L & L Wings, Inc. 962 F.2d 316 (4th Cir. 1992)
- Abercrombie & Fitch Co. v. Hunting World 537 F.2d 4 (2nd Cir. 1976) (established the spectrum of trademark distinctiveness in the United States, breaking trademarks into classes which are accorded differing degrees of protection)
- Aycock Engineering v. Airflite, Inc. 560 F.3d 1350 (Fed. Cir. 2009)

== B ==
- Barclays Capital Inc. v. Theflyonthewall.com 650 F.3d 876 (2d Cir. 2011) ("hot news" misappropriation is preempted by copyright law where claims fall within the scope of the Copyright Act)
- Blue Bell, Inc. v. Farah Manufacturing Co. 508 F.2d 1260 (5th Cir. 1975)

== C ==
- Cashmere & Camel Hair Manufacturers Institute v. Saks Fifth Avenue 284 F.3d 302 (1st Cir. 2002)
- Ciba-Geigy Canada Ltd. v. Apotex Inc. [1992] 3 S.C.R. 120
- Cliffs Notes, Inc. v. Bantam Doubleday Dell Publishing Group, Inc. 886 F.2d 490 (2d Cir. 1989)
- Consumers Distributing Co. v. Seiko Time Canada Ltd. : passing off

== D ==
- Dastar Corp. v. Twentieth Century Fox Film Corp. 539 U.S. 23 (2003) (it is a misuse of trademark law to try to use the doctrine of reverse passing off to assert protection over a formerly copyrighted work which has passed into public domain)
- Derry v. Peek (1888) LR 14 App Cas 337

== E ==
- Erven Warnink v. Townend & Sons Ltd. [1979] A.C. 731 (H.L.)
- Eva's Bridal Ltd. v. Halanick Enterprises, Inc. 639 F.3d 788 (7th Cir. 2011) (naked licensing led to the mark being cancelled on the grounds of abandonment)

== F ==
- Fagnelli Plumbing Co. v. Gillece Plumbing and Heating, Inc. 2011 U.S. Dist. LEXIS 15090 (WD Pa. 2011) (evaluating misleading description and consumer confusion claims in domain dispute)
- Frank Reddaway Ltd. v. George Banham [1896] A.C. 199 (H.L.)
- Frosty Treats, Inc. v. Sony Computer Entertainment America, Inc. (8th Cir. 2005)

== G ==
- Gibson Guitar Corp. v. Paul Reed Smith Guitars 423 F.3d 539 (6th Cir. 2005)
- GoPets Ltd v. Hise 657 F.3d 1024 (9th Cir. 2011) (Anticybersquatting Consumer Protection Act (ACPA) claims to be evaluated at the point of registration, not re-registration)
- Goto.com, Inc. v. Walt Disney Company 202 F.3d 1199 (9th Cir. 2000)

== H ==
- Houldsworth v. City Glasgow Bank (1818)
- Hornby v. TJX Companies 87 USPQ2d 1411 (T.T.A.B. 2008) (cancellation granted on the basis of false suggestion of a connection between Twiggy and the children's clothing line)

== I ==
- Institut National v. Andres Wines Ltd. (1987) 16 C.P.R. (3d) 385 (Ont. H.C.): "shared goodwill"
- Inwood Labs v. Ives Labs 456 U.S. 844 (1982) (evaluating functionality considerations and secondary liability for inducing infringement)

== K ==
- KP Permanent Make-Up, Inc. v. Lasting Impression I. Inc. 543 U.S. 111, 124 (2004) ("a plaintiff claiming infringement of an incontestable mark must show likelihood of consumer confusion as part of the prima facie case, ... while the defendant has no independent burden to negate the likelihood of any confusion in raising the affirmative defense that a term is used descriptively, not as a mark, fairly, and in good faith")

== L ==
- In re Lebanese Arak Corp., 94 U.S.P.Q.2d 1215 (T.T.A.B. 2010) (mark held to be disparaging due to its similarity to a term offensive to a religious group)
- Louis Vuitton v. Haute Diggity Dog 507 F.3d 252 (CA4 2007) (parody is not automatically a defense to dilution, but a successful parody changes the approach to the 6 dilution factors)

== M ==
- Mattel, Inc. v. MCA Records, Inc. 296 F.3d 894 (9th Cir. 2002), cert. denied, 537 U.S. 1171 (2003) (song which parodies Barbie is noninfringing free speech, not unfair competition or prohibited dilution)
- Moseley v. V Secret Catalogue, Inc. 537 U.S. 418 (2003) (evidence of actual dilution must be shown, not merely a likelihood of dilution)
- Mutual of Omaha Ins. Co. v. Novak, 775 F.2d 247 (8th Cir. 1985)
- Murphy Door Bed Co. v. Interior Sleep Systems, Inc. 874 F.2d 95 (2d Cir. 1989) (rejection of a claim of trademark infringement due to genericide of mark)

== N ==
- Nabisco, Inc. v. PF Brands, Inc. 191 F.3d 208 (2nd Cir. 1999)
- New Kids on the Block v. News America Publishing 971 F.2d 302 (9th Cir. 1992)

== O ==
- Orkin Exterminating Co. Inc. v. Pestco Co. of Canada Ltd. (1985) 5 C.P.R. (3d) 433 (Ont. C.A.): passing off

== P ==
- Park 'n Fly, Inc. v. Dollar Park and Fly, Inc. 469 U.S. 189 (1985)
- Peek v. Gurney (1873) LR 6 HL 377
- People for the Ethical Treatment of Animals v. Doughney, 263 F.3d 359 (4th Cir. 2001)
- Perry v. Truefitt (1842) 6 Beav. 66, 49 E.R. 749 : first passing off case
- Polaroid Corp. v. Polarad Elects. 287 F.2d 492 (2nd Cir. 1961)
- Pro-Football, Inc. v. Harjo 565 F.3d 880 (DC Cir. 2009)

== R ==
- Reckitt & Colman Products Ltd. v. Borden Inc. [1990] R.P.C. 341 (H.L.) packaging
- Rock & Roll Hall of Fame v. Gentile Productions 134 F.3d 749 (6th Cir. 1998) (pictures of buildings do not violate trademark law)
- Rogers v. Grimaldi, 875 F.2d 994 (2d Cir. 1989) (expressive uses of trademarks do not infringe)

== Q ==
- Qualitex Co. v. Jacobson Products Co., Inc., 514 U.S. 159 (1995) (a single color can qualify for trademark protection so long as it has acquired secondary meaning in the marketplace)

== S ==
- Société des Produits Nestlé S.A. v. Cadbury UK Limited [2012] EWHC 2637 (Ch) (1 October 2012)
- Source Perrier (Societe Anonyme) v. Fira-Less Marketing Co. Ltd. (1983) 70 C.P.R. (2d) 61
- Spalding v. Gamage (1915) 84 L.J.Ch. 449
- Stork Restaurant Inc. v. Sahati 166 F. 2d 348 (9th Cir. 1948)
- Sugar Busters v. Brennan 177 F.3d 258 (5th Cir. 1999)
- Synergistic International LLC v. Korman 470 F.3d 162 (4th Cir. 2006)

== T ==
- Tiffany (NJ) Inc. v. eBay Inc. 600 F.3d 93 (2nd Cir. 2010) (trademark owners have the burden of policing for counterfeit items when their products are sold in an online marketplace)
- Top Tobacco, LP v. North Atlantic Operating Co. 509 F.3d 380 (7th Cir. 2007)
- TrafFix Devices, Inc. v. Marketing Displays, Inc. 532 U.S. 23 (2001) (a functional design can not be trademarked, and a patented design is presumed to be functional)
- Two Pesos, Inc. v. Taco Cabana, Inc. 505 U.S. 763 (1992) (Supreme Court applied trademark distinctiveness spectrum to trade dress, arguably giving official sanction to the merger of the requirements for trademark and trade dress, noting that inherently distinctive trade dress required no showing of secondary meaning.)

== U ==
- Universal City Studios, Inc. v. Nintendo Co., Ltd. 746 F.2d 112 (SDNY 1982)
- United Industries Corp. v. Clorox Co. 140 F.3d 1175 (8th Cir. 1998)

== W ==
- Wal-Mart Stores v. Samara Brothers 529 U.S. 205 (2000) (regarding trade dress - a product's design is distinctive, and therefore protectable, only upon a showing of secondary meaning)

== Y ==
- Yale Electric Corp. v. Robertson 26 F. 2d 972 (2nd Cir. 1928) (protection of trade names; even if marks are on goods which are not in competition, the mark may be infringing if there is a significant likelihood of consumer confusion)
