= Confusion in Canadian trademark law =

Legal concept in Canadian trademark law

Under Canadian trade-mark law, "confusion" is where a trade-mark is similar enough to another trade-mark to cause consumers to equate them. Likelihood of confusion plays a central role in trade-mark registration, infringement and passing-off. Whether a trade-mark or trade-name is confusing is a question of fact. The role of confusion in trade-mark law is analogous to the role of substantial infringement in patent law.

== Definition ==
Section 6 of the Trademarks Act sets out the situations where a trade-mark is confusing:

6.(2) The use of a trade-mark causes confusion with another trade-mark if the use of both trade-marks in the same area would be likely to lead to the inference that the wares or services associated with those trade-marks are manufactured, sold, leased, hired or performed by the same person, whether or not the wares or service are of the same general class.

The essence of confusion is the inference of common source. In other words, Trade-mark A will be confusing with Trade-mark B if the use of both trade-marks in the same area will lead consumers to believe that the goods or services sold under either trade-mark originate from the same source.

== Statutory Factors ==
Section 6(5) of the Trademarks Act provides that in determining whether there is confusion, a court must examine "all of the surrounding circumstances" including:

(a) the inherent distinctiveness of the trade-marks or trade-names and the extent to which they have become known;

(b) the length of time the trade-marks or trade-names have been in use;

(c) the nature of the wares, services or business;

(d) the nature of the trade; and

(e) the degree of resemblance between the trade-marks or trade-names in appearance or sound or in the ideas suggested by them.

The factors under section 6(5) are not exhaustive. Also, given the factual nature of confusion, the particular factors considered and the weighing of the factors varies from case-to-case.

=== Degree of Resemblance ===
Determining the degree of resemblance between the trade-marks is the starting point of a confusion analysis. The assessment of resemblance under s. 6(5)(e) is not limited to similarities in the appearance of the trade-marks. Similar sounding word marks can be confusing, even if they appear to be different. Word marks representing similar ideas can be confusing (e.g. "Smoothies" and "Smarties" in the context of candies).

=== Standard of Comparison ===
In determining the degree of resemblance between the trade-marks, a court will examine each trade-mark as a whole, rather than breaking it up into its individual elements. For example, in Molson Companies Ltd. v. John Labatt Ltd., the Federal Court of Appeal compared the trade-marks "Molson Golden" and "Winchester Gold" in their entirety. Although both trade-marks used the descriptive "Gold" or "Golden", when viewed as a whole, the trade-marks were sufficiently distinguishable that there was no reasonable likelihood of confusion.

=== "Ordinary Casual Consumer Somewhat in a Hurry" ===
In a leading case on confusion, Mattel, Inc. v. 3894207 Canada Inc., the Supreme Court of Canada stated that the appropriate standard of comparison is that of the "ordinary casual consumer somewhat in a hurry". In applying this standard, a court will ask whether a consumer of average intelligence and caution casually encountering both trade-marks in the marketplace would be likely to confuse them.

=== Actual Evidence of Confusion ===
In addition to predicting whether an "ordinary casual consumer somewhat in a hurry" would perceive confusion, a court may also consider evidence of actual confusion of the trade-marks in the marketplace. Although evidence of actual confusion is not necessary, the presence or absence of actual confusion in the marketplace may be a relevant "surrounding circumstance" under s. 6(5) of the Trade-marks Act.

=== Distinctiveness ===
Marks consisting of everyday words or expressions are inherently less distinctive than ones based on invented or coined words or expressions. However, a mark based on an everyday word may nonetheless acquire distinctiveness if it is employed extensively. In Mattel, the Court found that although Mattel’s "Barbie" trade-mark was based on an every day word, it had acquired substantial distinctiveness through its strong association with the company's doll products.

=== Trade-marks in Different Businesses ===
Although section 6(2) of the Trade-marks Act provides that there can be confusion "whether or not the wares or service are of the same general class", differences in the types of goods or services associated with each trade-mark are a relevant consideration in determining confusion. In Mattel, the Supreme Court found it unlikely that consumers would confuse "Barbie" for dolls with "Barbie" for restaurants. Similarly, in Veuve Clicquot Ponsardin v. Boutiques Cliquot Ltée, the Supreme Court of Canada found that the use of "Cliquot" for mid-market women’s clothing stores was not confusing with "Veuve Clicquot" as a mark for a famous brand of champagne. While it is possible for a famous trade-mark holder to argue that its trade-mark will expand into new lines of business, there must a reasonable basis for this prediction.

== See also ==
- Canadian trade-mark law
- Passing off; trademark registration in Canadian law
- Mattel, Inc. v. 3894207 Canada Inc.
