= Ciba-Geigy Canada Ltd v Apotex Inc =

Ciba-Geigy Canada Ltd. v. Apotex Inc.
- Supreme Court of Canada

Hearing: March 27, 1992 Judgment: October 29, 1992
- Full case name: Ciba-Geigy Canada Ltd. v. Apotex Inc. and Novopharm Limited
- Citations: 1992 SCC 33, [1992] 3 S.C.R. 120, [1992] S.C.J. No 83
- Docket No.: 22251
- Prior history: Judgment against Ciba-Geigy in the Ontario Court of Appeal
- Ruling: Appeal allowed

Court membership
- Chief Justice: Antonio Lamer; Puisne Justices: Gérard La Forest, Claire L'Heureux-Dubé, John Sopinka, Charles Gonthier, Peter Cory, Beverley McLachlin, William Stevenson, Frank Iacobucci

Reasons given
- Unanimous reasons by: Gonthier J.
- Stevenson J. took no part in the consideration or decision of the case.

Ciba-Geigy Canada Ltd. v. Apotex Inc., [1992] 3 SCR 120, is a Supreme Court of Canada judgment on trademark law and more specifically the issue of passing off. Ciba-Geigy brought an action against Apotex and Novopharm, alleging that their versions of the prescription drug metoprolol were causing confusion to the public due to their similar appearance to Ciba-Geigy's version of the drug Lopresor. On appeal to the SCC, the issue was whether a plaintiff is required to establish that the public affected by the risk of confusion includes not only health care professionals but also the patients who consume the drugs in a passing off action involving prescription drugs of a similar appearance. The Supreme Court held affirmatively on this question.

== Background ==
Ciba-Geigy is a pharmaceutical laboratory which has manufactured and sold metoprolol tablets in Canada under the trade name "Lopresor" since 1977. Metoprolol is a prescription drug generally prescribed for hypertension. After Apotex obtained licenses to manufacture and sell metoprolol in Canada, its version of the tablets have had the same get-up (shape, size and colour) as those of Ciba-Geigy since 1986. Novopharm, another respondent joined in the action also manufactured tablets with the same get-up. The three drugs have been designated interchangeable pharmaceutical products by Ontario law, which means that a pharmacist may give a patient any one of them as long as the prescription does not specify no substitution. In June 1986 the Ciba-Geigy brought passing-off actions against Apotex and Novopharm, alleging that its metoprolol tablets have a unique get-up by reason of their size, shape and colour and that this get-up has become associated with its product. In order to establish that Apotex and Novopharm were engaged in passing off by confusing the public with their products, Ciba-Geigy needed to prove that the customers of these drugs were likely to be misled by the similarity of the products.

At the trial level, Ciba-Geigy failed to establish that the customers, namely physicians and pharmacists that prescribe or dispense metoprolol, were confused in choosing the brand of metoprolol to give to patients due to the similar appearance of the tablets. For this reason, the Supreme Court of Ontario refused to issue an interlocutory injunction because Ciba-Geigy failed to show that there was a "serious issue" to be tried. At the Court of Appeal, Ciba-Geigy argued that the customers affected by the passing-off should include ultimate consumer of the prescribed drug as they are likely to be confused by the similar appearance of the products in question. The Court of Appeal rejected its argument and dismissed the appeal.

== Reasons of the court ==
The unanimous judgment of the Supreme Court was delivered by Justice Gonthier. The Court allowed the appeal and held that a plaintiff in an action for the alleged passing-off of a prescription drug must establish that the conduct complained of is likely to result in the confusion of physicians, pharmacists or patients/customers in choosing whether to prescribe, dispense or request either the plaintiff's or the defendant's product. Therefore, patients are considered to be part of the relevant public in a passing-off action as they are the ultimate consumers of the drugs.

=== General principles of passing off ===
The Court concluded three necessary components of a passing-off action from previous case law: the existence of goodwill, deception of the public due to a misrepresentation and actual or potential damage to the plaintiff. In order for a manufacturer to succeed in a passing off action, he or she had to show that its product had acquired a secondary meaning with its customers and that the competing product was likely to create a risk of confusion in the public mind. The confusion can arise from both wilful as well as negligent or careless misrepresentation by the manufacturer.

=== Purposes of the passing off action ===
The Court stated that the purpose of a passing-off action is to protect all persons affected by the product, which include the persons who manufacture or market the products, on the one hand ("the manufacturers"), and on the other to those for whom the products are intended, the persons who buy, use or consume them ("the customers").

==== Protection of manufacturers ====
In determining the purpose of a passing off action, the Court cited Consumers Distributing Co. v. Seiko Time Canada Ltd.: "The courts have wavered between two conceptions of a passing-off action -- as a remedy for the invasion of a quasi-proprietary right in a trade name or trade mark, and as a remedy, analogous to the action on the case for deceit, for invasion of the personal right not to be injured by fraudulent competition."

The Court decided that the true basis of a passing off action is the latter, or that it injures a property right in the plaintiff, which is the owner's right to the goodwill of his or her business. It further concluded that the purpose of passing off is also to prevent unfair competition and loss of profit for the manufacturer injured by the misrepresentation.

==== Protection of customers ====
The SCC has long recognized trademark laws as being enacted primarily in the interest and for the protection of the public. The Court in this case also emphasizes that the purpose of a passing off action is to protect the public from misrepresentation by manufacturers.

Because the product's appearance or its packaging, in terms of shape, size or colour, may be characteristic of a particular manufacturer, consumer may associate the appearance with either a brand or trademark in his or her mind, or rely on the appearance to indicate the use of the product without knowing the name of the product or manufacturer. The question that needed to be addressed by the Court was that who are the consumers that must be protected from being confused by manufacturers when their products are of a similar appearance. Based on previous cases outside the field of pharmaceutical products, the Court observed that the "clientele" in whose minds confusion must be avoided includes all customers, whether direct (for example retailers) or indirect (consumers).

=== Affected customers in the pharmaceutical field ===
An important precedent considered in this appeal is the case of Ayerst, McKenna & Harrison, Inc. v. Apotex Inc.(1983), which addressed similar issues associated with drugs with similar appearance. In the Court of Appeal decision, Cory J.A. commented that for the purposes of a passing-off action the customers of pharmaceutical laboratories consist exclusively of health care professionals and not the patients who use the product. This decision was subsequently followed by a number of cases. The Court declined to follow the opinion in Ayerst, McKenna & Harrison. One of the reasons is that the field of prescription drugs is just like any other market, where the ultimate consumer should be taken into account in a tort of passing off, and there is no reason for the Court to adopt a different rule when the manufacturer is a pharmaceutical laboratory. In addressing Ciba-Geigy's argument, the Court also observed that despite the regulatory restriction on public advertising of prescription drugs, patients can still gain knowledge about the products through pharmaceutical advertising directed at health care professionals, and therefore risk being affected by confusion. Another important consideration by the Court is that the Prescription Drug Cost Regulation Act which later came into force gave patients increased control over the brand of drug he or she wishes to obtain where the product is interchangeable. The Court found that patients do have the opportunity to exercise their choice over the product brand in the prescription process, therefore patients should be included in the customers covered by the passing-off action as they are also exposed to the risk of confusion.

== See also ==
- Passing off in Canadian law
- List of trademark case law
- List of Supreme Court of Canada cases (Lamer Court)
