= Kirkbi AG v Ritvik Holdings Inc =

Kirkbi AG v. Ritvik Holdings Inc.
- Supreme Court of Canada

Hearing: March 16, 2005 Judgment: November 17, 2005
- Full case name: Kirkbi AG and Lego Canada Inc. v. Ritvik Holdings Inc./Gestions Ritvik Inc. (now operating as Mega Bloks Inc.)
- Citations: 2005 SCC 65, [2005] 3 SCR 302
- Docket No.: 29956
- Prior history: APPEAL from a judgment of the Federal Court of Appeal (Rothstein, Sexton and Pelletier JJA), 2003 FCA 297, [2004] 2 FCR 241 (14 July 2003), upholding a decision of Gibson J 2002 FCT 585 (24 May 2002), Federal Court (Canada)
- Ruling: Appeal dismissed

Holding
- Kirkbi’s passing‑off claim under s. 7(b) must be dismissed, as is barred by the application of the doctrine of functionality.

Court membership
- Chief Justice: Beverley McLachlin; Puisne Justices: Michel Bastarache, Ian Binnie, Louis LeBel, Marie Deschamps, Morris Fish, Rosalie Abella, Louise Charron

Reasons given
- Unanimous reasons by: LeBel J

Laws applied
- Trade-marks Act (R.S.C. 1985, c. T-13, s. 7(b))

Kirkbi AG v. Ritvik Holdings Inc. [2005] 3 S.C.R. 302, 2005 SCC 65, popularly known as the Lego Case, is a decision of the Supreme Court of Canada. The Court upheld the constitutionality of section 7(b) of the Trade-marks Act which prohibits the use of confusing marks, as well, on a second issue it was held that the doctrine of functionality applied to unregistered trade-marks.

== Background ==
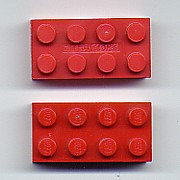
Mega Bloks building block (above) and Lego building brick (below)

=== History of the Trade-marks Act ===
While s. 91 of the Constitution Act, 1867 gives the Parliament of Canada jurisdiction over copyright and patent matters, it is silent with respect to trademarks. However, the Judicial Committee of the Privy Council and the Supreme Court of Canada have both suggested in their jurisprudence that the Trade-marks Act is a valid exercise of the federal trade and commerce power.

=== Lego and Mega Bloks ===
Kirkbi AG, a member of The Lego Group, previously held patents in the design and form of Lego blocks, which had expired in Canada and elsewhere. Ritvik produced the pieces known as Mega Bloks. Kirkbi attempted to register the design of their blocks as a trade-mark but was denied by the Registrar of Trade-marks. Kirkbi then asserted unregistered trade-mark rights against Ritvik through an unregistered trade-mark in the distinctive orthogonal pattern of raised studs distributed on the top of each toy-building brick, and claimed relief under s. 7(b) of the Act, as well as under the common law doctrine of passing off.

Ritvik denied any breach under the Act or at common law and counterclaimed, seeking a declaration that it was entitled to continue to make, offer for sale and sell in Canada its blocks and related parts.

== Lower courts ==
=== Federal Court ===
Gibson J. dismissed Kirkbi's claim of based on trade-mark, finding that:

- Kirkbi had an interest in an unregistered trademark, but only with respect of the inscription "LEGO" on the top surface of each stud,
- there was no trademark protection in purely functional features, and
- in considering the claim of passing off, while Kirkbi had acquired goodwill in the particular configuration of its bricks, it had failed to prove that Ritvik had intentionally misrepresented its product.

=== Federal Court of Appeal ===
Kirkbi's appeal was dismissed. Writing for the majority, Sexton JA did not comment on the questions of confusion and the elements of the tort of passing off, but did find that the doctrine of functionality applied to trade-marks, whether registered or not.

In dissent, Pelletier JA, held:

- the "LEGO" mark, although functional, could still be the basis of a passing-off claim under s. 7(b), as Kirkbi was entitled to protection against the confusing use of its unregistered mark
- the doctrine of functionality was no longer part of the law of trade-marks in Canada in respect of unregistered marks, by reason of changes to the Act
- the elements of passing off had been made out, since, even though no deliberate strategy to deceive had been established, confusion in the market between Kirkbi and Ritvik products had been proved.

== Supreme Court ==
In a unanimous judgment, the appeal was dismissed. In his reasons, LeBel J held that:

- s. 7(b) of the Trade‑marks Act was intra vires the Parliament of Canada, and
- Kirkbi’s passing‑off claim under s. 7(b) must be dismissed, as it is barred by the application of the doctrine of functionality.

=== Constitutionality ===
It was not until the case was at the Supreme Court that Ritvik challenged the constitutionality of s. 7(b) of the Trade-marks Act. LeBel J stated that it was constitutional, saying:

- the intrusion of s. 7(b) into provincial jurisdiction is minimal, as it is remedial and is limited in its application by the provisions of the Act.
- the Trade‑marks Act is a valid exercise of Parliament’s general trade and commerce power.
- s. 7(b) is sufficiently integrated into the Trade‑marks Act, as a "functional relationship", such as is present here, is sufficient to sustain the constitutionality of the provision.

=== Doctrine of Functionality ===
Citing jurisprudence dating back to 1964, LeBel noted:

The law appears to be well settled that if what is sought to be registered as a trade mark has a functional use or characteristic, it cannot be the subject of a trade mark.

The Court noted that the Trade-marks Act specifically excluded protection from "utilitarian features of a distinguishing guise". It recognized that allowing the claim created a concern with "overextending monopoly rights on the products themselves and impeding competition, in respect of wares sharing the same technical characteristics." The Court agreed with the Federal Court of Appeal ruling, which found no difference between the legal attributes held by registered and unregistered marks. It looked to the text and the legislative history of the act to determine that there was no intention to give unregistered marks more protection than registered marks.

=== Passing Off ===
Though the Court disposed of the case in ruling there was no cause of action under trade-mark law, it nonetheless considered the common law tort of passing off. It found that three elements were required to establish the tort:

- existence of goodwill,
- deception of the public due to a misrepresentation, and
- actual or potential damage to the plaintiff.

In this case, K's claim was bound to fail because it would not have met the first condition of the action. The alleged distinctiveness of the product consisted precisely of the process and techniques which were now common to the trade.

While deception had been proven, the SCC noted that the trial judge had interpreted it too narrowly. Misrepresentation may be wilful and may thus mean the same thing as deceit. But now the doctrine of passing off also covers negligent or careless misrepresentation by the trader. As there was no discussion in the present case as to the question of damages, no comment was made.

== Impact ==
Kirkbi, together with General Motors of Canada Ltd. v. City National Leasing, are leading cases on the scope of Parliament's trade and commerce power, particularly with respect to the general branch of that power. It reflects the current view of the Court that favours interprovincial economic integration, especially with the respect to the views expressed by Peter Hogg and Warren Grover:

It is surely obvious that major regulation of the Canadian economy has to be national. Goods and services, and the cash or credit which purchases them, flow freely from one part of the country to another without regard for provincial boundaries. Indeed, a basic concept of the federation is that it must be an economic union.... The relative unimportance of provincial boundaries has become progressively more obvious as industry has tended to become more concentrated.

On the more specific questions of intellectual property law, Kirkbi can also be seen as encouraging manufacturers of products embodying functional modular designs to employ appropriately clever branding and marketing, so that such designs may be seen as a source of distinctiveness, and thus deserving of trademark protection.

== See also ==
- List of Supreme Court of Canada cases (McLachlin Court)
- TrafFix Devices, Inc. v. Marketing Displays, Inc., 532 U.S. 23 (2001), a similar U.S. case.
