= Frank Reddaway Ltd v Banham =

Frank Reddaway Ltd. v. George Banham, [1896] A.C. 199 is a landmark decision of the UK House of Lords on the tort of passing off. The Court held that purely descriptive product names such as "camel hair belting" can acquire secondary meaning, and consequently, is protected from passing off.

Frank Reddaway (c.1855-1943) made machine belting which he sold under the name "Camel Hair Belting" for many years. He had founded his business in Pendleton, Lancashire around 1874 and converted it into a limited liability company in 1892. George Banham was a former employee of Reddaway who left to start his own business manufacturing machine belting which he also later called "Camel Hair Belting".

== Legal proceedings ==
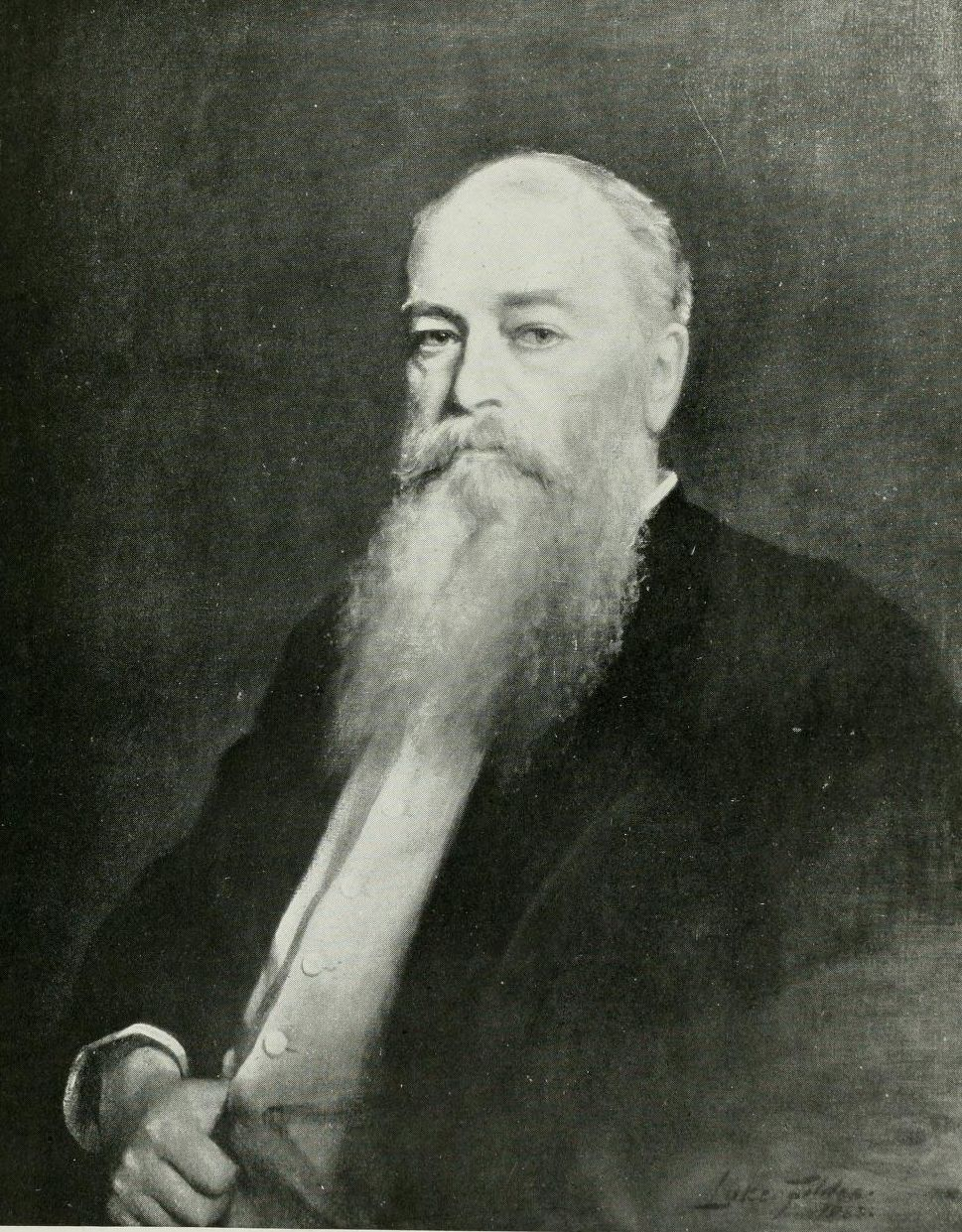
Frank Reddaway, plaintiff

Reddaway sued Banham for passing off. He argued that there was a large portion of the public who recognized the name "Camel Hair Belting" as his product. He was also able to demonstrate that there were people who were getting the products confused. The case went to a jury trial in Manchester in 1894.

The Court of Appeal in 1895 held that the name was merely descriptive and so could not be protected.

The House of Lords overturned the decision of the Court of Appeal in 1896. Lord Herschell held that the words had acquired a secondary meaning through its broad notoriety, and that the public clearly associated the name "Camel Hair Belting" with the exact product produced by Reddaway. Lord Herschell stated:

I cannot help saying that, if the defendants are entitled to lead purchasers to believe that they are getting the plaintiffs' manufacture when they are not, and thus to cheat the plaintiffs of some of their legitimate trade, I should regret to find that the law was powerless to enforce the most elementary principles of commercial morality.'

== See also ==
- List of trademark case law
- List of House of Lords cases
