= Registered trademark symbol =

Typographical symbol (®)

®o

Registered trademark symbol
- In Unicode: U+00AE ® REGISTERED SIGN (&reg;, &REG;, &circledR;)

Different from
- Different from: U+24C7 Ⓡ CIRCLED LATIN CAPITAL LETTER R

Related
- See also: U+2122 ™ TRADE MARK SIGN; U+2120 ℠ SERVICE MARK

The registered trademark symbol, ®, is a typographic symbol that provides notice that the preceding word or symbol is a trademark or service mark that has been registered with a national trademark office. A trademark is a symbol, word, or words legally registered or established by use as representing a company, product or service.

Unregistered trademarks can instead be marked with the trademark symbol, ™, while unregistered service marks are marked with the service mark symbol, ℠. The proper manner to display these symbols is immediately following the mark; the symbol is commonly in superscript style, but that is not legally required. In many jurisdictions, only registered trademarks confer easily defended legal rights.

In the US, the registered trademark symbol was originally introduced in the Trademark Act of 1946.

Because the symbol is not commonly available on typewriters (or ASCII), it was common to approximate it with "(r)" or "(R)". (Note: Most word processors will autocorrect these two sequences to a proper ® symbol.) It is also legal in the US to use the text "Registered, U.S. Patent and Trademark Office" or "Reg U.S. Pat & TM Off."

== Computer usage ==
The registered trademark character was added to several extended ASCII character sets, including ISO-8859-1 from which it was inherited by Unicode as U+00AE ® REGISTERED SIGN.

== Other national marks ==
Canada

- Official mark symbol, U+24C2 Ⓜ CIRCLED LATIN CAPITAL LETTER M, used in Canada also has an to indicate that a name or design used by Canadian public authorities is protected.
- Marque de commerce symbol, U+1F16A 🅪 RAISED MC SIGN, is used in French-language materials in Canada.

China

- In China, the trademark regulations provide the symbol ㊟ (U+329F ㊟ CIRCLED IDEOGRAPH ATTENTION) may be used to show a registered trademark instead of ®.

Germany

- Warenzeichen grapheme, U+1F12E 🄮 CIRCLED WZ, used in some German publications, especially dictionaries, as informative and independent of the actual protection status of the name.

== See also ==
- The trademark symbol, U+2122 ™ TRADE MARK SIGN, used for unregistered trademarks
- The service mark symbol, U+2120 ℠ SERVICE MARK, used for unregistered service marks
- The copyright symbol, U+00A9 © COPYRIGHT SIGN
- The sound recording copyright symbol, U+2117 ℗ SOUND RECORDING COPYRIGHT
- The Orthodox Union hechsher symbol, U+24CA Ⓤ CIRCLED LATIN CAPITAL LETTER U
