= Trademark symbol =

Typographical symbol (™)

™o

Trademark symbol
- In Unicode: U+2122 ™ TRADE MARK SIGN (HTML &trade;)

Different from
- Different from: U+2120 ℠ SERVICE MARK; U+00AE ® REGISTERED SIGN

Related
- See also: U+1F16A 🅪 RAISED MC SIGN; U+1F12E 🄮 CIRCLED WZ; U+24C2 Ⓜ CIRCLED LATIN CAPITAL LETTER M

The trademark symbol ™ is a symbol to indicate that the preceding mark is a trademark, specifically an unregistered trademark. It complements the registered trademark symbol ® which is reserved for trademarks registered with an appropriate government agency.

In Canada, an equivalent marque de commerce symbol, (U+1F16A 🅪 RAISED MC SIGN) is used in French. Canada also has an official mark symbol, ⟨Ⓜ⟩, to indicate that a name or design used by Canadian public authorities is protected. Some German publications, especially dictionaries, also use a Warenzeichen grapheme, (U+1F12E 🄮 CIRCLED WZ), which is informative and independent of the actual protection status of the name.

== Use ==
Use of the trademark symbol indicates an assertion that a word, image, or other sign is a trademark; it does not indicate registration or impart enhanced protections. Registered trademarks are indicated using the registered trademark symbol, ®, and in many jurisdictions it is unlawful or illegal to use the registered trademark symbol with a mark that has not been registered.

The service mark symbol, ℠, is used to indicate the assertion of a service mark (a trademark for the provision of services). The service mark symbol is less commonly used than the trademark sign, especially outside the United States.

On social media, the trademark symbol has seen use in an unofficial and ironic fashion, highlighting a concept as if it were important enough to warrant its own trademark, for example, "Verity™" or "soon™".

== Non-standard substitutions ==
The letters ⟨T⟩ and ⟨M⟩ are sometimes seen paired in an attempt to emulate the trademark symbol. Methods include

- (TM), the letters in normal form, enclosed in parentheses
- TM, the letters written in small caps, on the baseline
- ^{TM}, the letters written as superscripts, as in mathematical exponentiation
- ᵀᴹ, using symbols from the Phonetic Extensions block in Unicode

== See also ==
- Trademark – Trade identifier of products or services
- Trademark law – International laws
  - Australian trademark law
  - Canadian trademark law
  - Chinese trademark law
  - British trademark law
  - United States trademark law
  - Indian trademark law
  - Japanese trademark law
- Unicode input – Input characters using their Unicode code points
