= Functionality in Canadian trademark law =

Under Canadian trade-mark law, the "doctrine of functionality" provides that features that are primarily functional in nature cannot be registered as trade-marks. The doctrine of functionality reflects the purpose of trade-mark, which is the protection of the distinctiveness of the wares and services associated with a trade-mark. Unlike patents, trade-marks do not protect the utilitarian features of products. The doctrine of functionality is reflected in section 13(2) of the "Trade-marks Act", which provides that: "No registration of a distinguishing guise interferes with the use of any utilitarian feature embodied in the distinguishing guise". On the basis of functionality, courts have denied trade-mark protection for such features as the pattern of knobs on LEGO blocks and the shape of the head of an electric razor.

== See also ==
- Canadian trade-mark law
- Kirkbi AG v. Ritvik Holdings Inc.
