= Trademark distinctiveness =

Concept in trademark law

Trademark distinctiveness is an important concept in the law governing trademarks and service marks. A trademark may be eligible for registration, or registrable, if it performs the essential trademark function, and has distinctive character. Registrability can be understood as a continuum, with "inherently distinctive" marks at one end, "generic" and "descriptive" marks with no distinctive character at the other end, and "suggestive" and "arbitrary" marks lying between these two points. "Descriptive" marks must acquire distinctiveness through secondary meaning—consumers have come to recognize the mark as a source indicator—to be protectable. "Generic" terms are used to refer to the product or service itself and cannot be used as trademarks.

== The spectrum of distinctiveness ==
In United States trademark law, Abercrombie & Fitch Co. v. Hunting World 537 F.2d 4 (2nd Cir. 1976) established the spectrum of trademark distinctiveness in the US, breaking trademarks into classes which are accorded differing degrees of protection. Courts often speak of marks falling along the following "spectrum of distinctiveness," also known within the US as the "Abercrombie classification" or "Abercrombie factors": Legal scholars such as Rebecca Tushnet and S. Adarsh have argued that the Abercrombie spectrum “lacks empirical foundation” and is out of step with consumer psychology and marketing theory.

Some jurisdictions have adopted alternate approaches. For example, in China, a 2017 decision of the Supreme People’s Court formally rejected the spectrum of distinctiveness in favor of an empirical test modeled on earlier court decisions, emphasizing instead that distinctiveness should be determined by assessing how the public perceives a mark in relation to the source of the goods rather than relying solely on the traditional classification spectrum.

=== Fanciful marks ===

A fanciful / inherently distinctive trademark is prima facie registrable, and comprises an entirely invented or "fanciful" sign. For example, "Kodak" had no meaning before it was adopted and used as a trademark in relation to goods, whether photographic goods or otherwise. Invented marks are neologisms which will not previously have been found in any dictionary.

=== Arbitrary marks ===
An arbitrary trademark is usually a common word which is used in a meaningless context (e.g. "Apple" for computers). Such marks consist of words or images which have some dictionary meaning before being adopted as trademarks, but which are used in connection with products or services unrelated to that dictionary meaning. Arbitrary marks are also immediately eligible for registration. Salty would be an arbitrary mark if used in connection with e.g. telephones such as in Salty Telephones, as the term "salt" has no particular connection with such products.

=== Suggestive marks ===
A suggestive mark tends to indicate the nature, quality, or a characteristic of the products or services in relation to which it is used, but does not describe this characteristic, and requires imagination on the part of the consumer to identify the characteristic. Suggestive marks invoke the consumer’s perceptive imagination. Examples of a suggestive mark are Blu-ray, a new technology of high-capacity data storage that utilizes a "blue" (actually violet) laser and Airbus, an aerospace corporation manufacturing commercial aircraft.

=== Descriptive marks ===
A descriptive mark is a term with a dictionary meaning which is used in connection with products or services directly related to that meaning. An example might be Salty used in connection with saltine crackers or anchovies. Such terms are not registrable unless it attains a 'secondary meaning', such that the mark is so distinctive that people associated it with a specific brand name in the marketplace.

=== Generic terms ===
A generic term is the common name for the products or services in connection with which it is used, such as "salt" when used in connection with sodium chloride. A generic term is not capable of serving the essential trademark function of distinguishing the products or services of a business from the products or services of other businesses, and therefore cannot be afforded any legal protection. This is because there has to be some term which may generally be used by anyone—including other manufacturers—to refer to a product without using some organization's proprietary trademark. Marks which become generic after losing distinctive character are known as generic trademarks. Marks which are a misspelling of a generic term (e.g., the elimination of a space) do not change the generic significance of the term. Aspirin tablet is a registered trademark by Bayer AG. Aspirin is a generic word in the United States for the pain reliever acetylsalicylic acid (also known as ASA). Another example is the term "cyberpunk", which in the United States is a registered trademark by R. Talsorian Games Inc. for its tabletop role-playing game and within the European Union by CD Projekt SA for "games and online gaming services" (particularly for the video game adaptation of the former) and by Sony Music for use outside games. Trademark right is generally country specific. Thus, a mark that becomes generic in one country, such as the example of Aspirin, can still be used and recognized as a trademark in another country.

== Assessing distinctiveness ==
In trademark litigation, courts are most frequently asked to distinguish between suggestive and descriptive marks on the one hand, and between descriptive and generic marks on the other. This is because suggestive marks, like fanciful and arbitrary marks, are presumed to be entitled to trademark protection, while descriptive marks are entitled to protection if they have become known as representing the producer of the goods, and generic marks can never receive protection. It can be seen from the examples above that the distinctive character of a term is closely related to the products or services in relation to which the term is used.

A general method for assessing the distinctive character of a mark is to consider a consumer's reaction to a mark. The mark may only be inherently registrable if the consumer has never encountered the mark before. On the other hand, the mark is unlikely to be inherently registrable if it informs him about any characteristic of the relevant products or services (e.g. whether they are delicious, large, spicy, black, or sweet, in the case of fruit). In any other case the mark may not be registrable.

Another example of a descriptive mark would be a geographical word or phrase that merely indicates the origin of the product or service. For example, Houston based ice cream might find that the name "Houston ice cream" is denied trademark protection on the grounds that the word Houston is merely descriptive. However, they might have better luck with the name "North Pole ice cream". In the latter case, although North Pole is a geographical location, the ice cream is not actually made at the North Pole, and no reasonable person would assume that the phrase North Pole is literally descriptive.

Therefore marks that identify or describe a product or service, or that are in common use, or that are used as geographical indications, generally cannot be registered as trademarks, and remain in the public domain for use by anyone. For example, a generic term such as "apple", or descriptive terms such as "red" or "juicy" could not be registered in relation to apples.

Primary consideration in the selection and use of trademarks should be given to marks which are inherently distinctive, as they possess the strongest distinctive character and do not require evidence of use to establish acquired distinctiveness. A fanciful, arbitrary, or suggestive term can be inherently distinctive and registrable without proof of acquired distinctiveness. Although these categories are most easily applied in relation to trademarks comprising words, the same general principles are applied in relation to all kinds of trademarks. For example, a pine tree shape is descriptive when used on pine-scented products.

=== Acquired distinctiveness ===
A trademark with no distinctive character (i.e. a mark which is not inherently distinctive) is prima facie unregistrable. However, most jurisdictions may still allow such marks to be registered if the trademark owner can demonstrate, typically by reference to evidence of use, that consumers in the marketplace exclusively associate the mark, as used on the identified goods or in connection with the identified services, with a particular commercial origin or source (i.e. the trademark owner). "Use" may include authorized use by a licensee or other party. If the trade mark office is satisfied that the evidence demonstrates that a mark has "acquired" distinctive character as a matter of fact, then the mark may be accepted for registration on the basis of acquired distinctiveness.

The nature and extent of acceptable evidence of use varies between jurisdictions, although the most useful evidence usually includes sales figures, details of advertising and promotional expenditure, and examples of promotional material. Consumer surveys may also help establish that consumers chiefly associate an otherwise non-distinctive mark with the trademark owner and its products or services. Generally, evidence of use may only be acceptable or relevant if it covers a certain period of time (e.g. three years prior to the filing date of the trademark application) and originates from within the jurisdiction where registration is sought.

The terminology of acquired distinctiveness is accepted in the European Union and Commonwealth jurisdictions such as Australia, Hong Kong and the United Kingdom, and the common law jurisdiction of the United States (which also uses the term secondary meaning). In the U.S., if a trademark has been used for a continuous period of at least five years after the date of registration, the right to use the mark and the registration may become "incontestable" (e.g. invulnerable to cancellation for non-use, but not for becoming generic). In such cases the USPTO checks and confirms whether the request for incontestability meets formality requirements, but whether a registration is incontestable at law can only be determined during legal proceedings involving the registration.

The essential function of a trademark is to exclusively identify the commercial source or origin of products or services, such that a trademark, properly called, indicates source or serves as a badge of origin. The use of a trademark in this way is known as trademark use. Certain exclusive rights attach to a registered mark, which can be enforced by way of an action for trademark infringement, while unregistered trademark rights may be enforced pursuant to the common law tort of passing off.

Trademark rights generally arise out of the use and/or registration (see below) of a mark in connection only with a specific type or range of products or services. Although it may sometimes be possible to take legal action to prevent the use of a mark in relation to products or services outside this range (e.g. for passing off), this does not mean that trademark law prevents the use of that mark by the general public. A common word, phrase, or other sign can only be removed from the public domain to the extent that a trademark owner is able to maintain exclusive rights over that sign in relation to certain products or services, assuming there are no other trademark objections. For a case study in both concepts, see Apple Corps v Apple Computer.

=== Maintaining distinctiveness ===
If a court rules that a trademark has become "generic" through common use (such that the mark no longer performs the essential trademark function and the average consumer no longer considers that exclusive rights attach to it), the corresponding registration may also be ruled invalid.

For example, the Bayer company's trademark "Aspirin" has been ruled generic in the United States, so other companies may use that name for acetylsalicylic acid as well (although it is still a trademark in Canada). Xerox for photocopiers and Band-Aid for adhesive bandages are both trademarks which are at risk of losing their trademark status by becoming declared generic in certain countries, something that the respective trademark owners actively seek to prevent. In order to prevent marks becoming generic, trademark owners often contact those who appear to be using the trademark incorrectly, from web page authors to dictionary editors, and request that they cease the improper usage.

The proper use of a trademark means using the mark as an adjective, not as a noun or a verb, though for certain trademarks, use as nouns and, less commonly, verbs is common. For example, Adobe sent e-mails to many web authors using the term "photoshopped" telling them that they should only use the term "modified by Adobe® Photoshop® software." Xerox has also purchased print advertisements declaring that "you cannot 'xerox' a document, but you can copy it on a Xerox Brand copying on machine." Another popular example is the use of the word "frappuccino" by Starbucks customers to mean any blended coffee beverage, though employees are instructed to only say "frappuccino blended coffee" or "frappuccino blended cream" when referring to such drinks. This rule is not hard-and-fast, however; for example, Lexis-Nexis has a U.S. trademark registration for "Shepardize," Reg. No. 1743711, and defines "Shepardizing on a web page as "the process of looking up citations" in "a series of books called Shepard's Citations." Such efforts may or may not be successful in preventing genericism in the long run, which depends less on the mark owner's efforts and more on how the public actually perceives and uses the mark. In fact, legally it is more important that the trademark holder visibly and actively seems to attempt to prevent its trademark from becoming generic, regardless of real success.

== See also ==
- Ghost marks
- Glossary of legal terms in technology
- International Trademark Association
- Madrid system
- Proper adjective
- Service marks
- Trade dress
- Trademark attorney
- Trademark dilution
- Unregistered trademark
