= Spalding v Gamage =

AG Spalding and Bros v AW Gamage Ltd
- Court: House of Lords
- Decided: 1915
- Citation: (1915) 84 LJ Ch 449, (1915) 113 LT 198, (1915) 31 TLR 328, (1914-1915) All E.R. Rep 147, (1915) 32 RPC 273

Case history
- Related action: Trademark Law

Case opinions
- passing off

Keywords
- Tort law

AG Spalding and Bros v AW Gamage Ltd, (1915) 84 LJ Ch 449, (1915) 113 LT 198, (1915) 31 TLR 328, [1914-15] All ER Rep 147, (1915) 32 RPC 273, is a leading decision of the House of Lords on the tort of passing off. The Court established a three-part test for a successful claim of passing off. First, the claimant's product must have goodwill. Second, there must be a misrepresentation by the defendant's product, and third, there must be damages inflicted upon the claimant.

== See also ==
- List of trademark case law
