= Service mark symbol =

Typographical symbol (℠)

℠o

Service mark symbol
- In Unicode: U+2120 ℠ SERVICE MARK

Different from
- Different from: U+2122 ™ TRADE MARK SIGN; U+00AE ® REGISTERED SIGN

The service mark symbol ℠ (the letters ⟨SM⟩ in small capitals and superscript style), is a symbol used in the United States and some other jurisdictions to provide notice that the preceding mark is a service mark. This symbol may be used for service marks not yet registered with the relevant national authority. Upon successful registration, registered services are marked with the same symbol as is used for registered trademarks, the registered trademark symbol ®. The proper manner to display the symbol is immediately following the service name, in superscript style.

== Related symbols ==
- Registered trademark symbol is also used for registered service marks
- Trademark symbol ™

== See also ==
- World Intellectual Property Organization
- Unicode input – Input characters using their Unicode code points
