= Sify =

Indian information technology company

Sify Technologies Limited
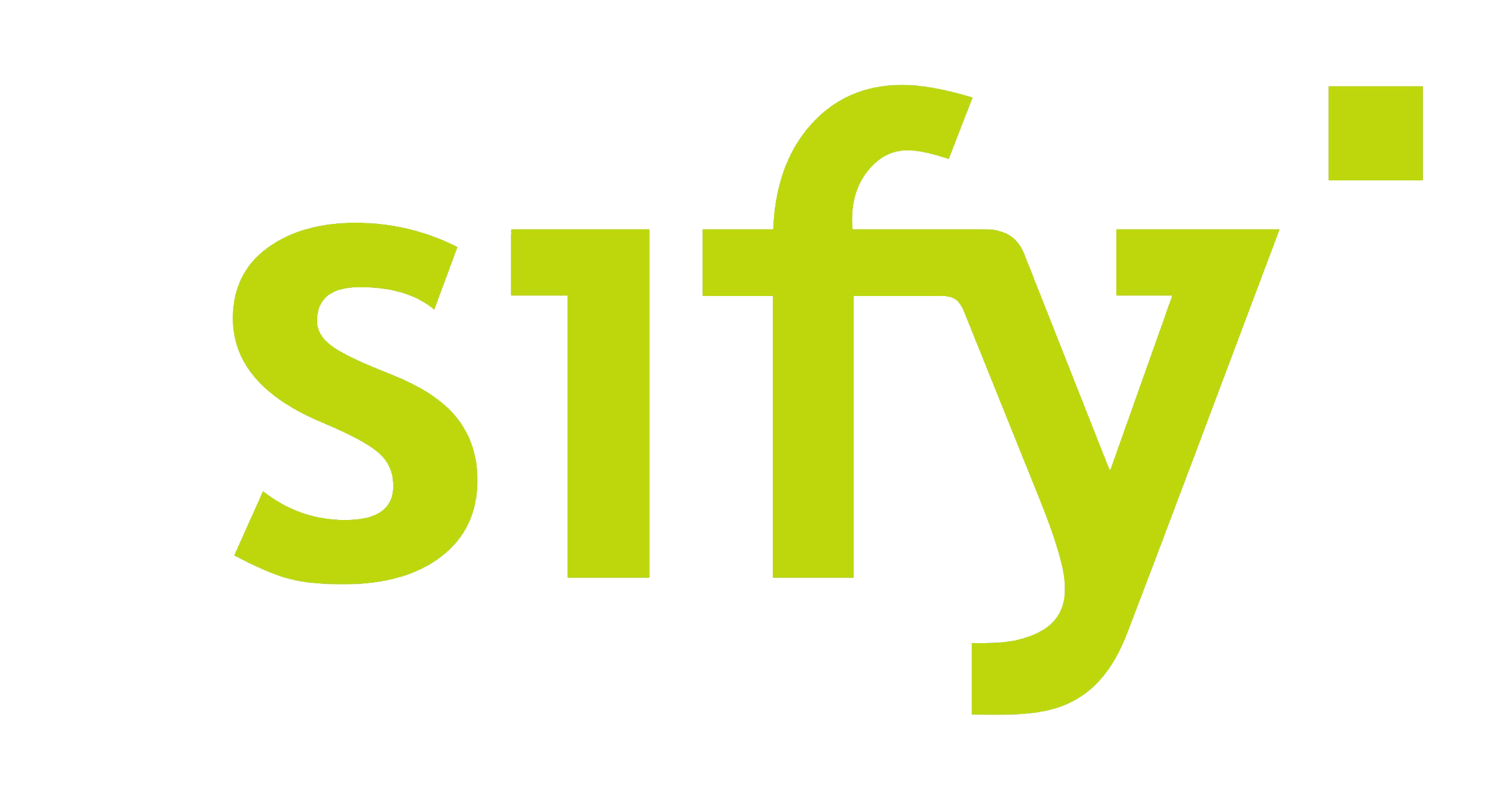
- Type: Public company
- Traded as: Nasdaq: SIFY; FWB: SIFY
- Industry: Internet
- Genre: Information and communications technology
- Founded: 12 December 1995; 30 years ago
- Founder: R. Ramaraj
- Headquarters: Tharamani, Chennai, Tamil Nadu, India
- Area served: India; United States of America; United Kingdom; Singapore; Dubai
- Key people: Raju Vegesna (Chairman & managing director); Vijay Kumar (CFO)
- Products: Corporate network; Internet access; Online portal; e-commerce; e-learning software
- Revenue: ▲₹2,507 crore (US$270 million) (March 2018)
- Number of employees: 2,655
- Website: www.sifytechnologies.com

Sify Technologies Limited (formerly Satyam Infoway) is an Indian information and communications technology (ICT) company providing telecom services, data center services, cloud & managed services, transformation integration services, and application integration services. Sify Technologies Limited was an early provider of Internet and e-commerce services in India. It has been listed on NASDAQ as SIFY since October 1999. Merrill Lynch was the underwriter for Sify's IPO on the NASDAQ. Sify was founded and led to IPO by R. Ramaraj.

== History ==
In November 1999, Sify paid ₹122.2 crore for a 24.5% stake in IndiaWorld Communications. It acquired the remaining shares for ₹325.4 crore on 30 June 2000.

In March 2002, Sify made an agreement with Makemytrip to run Sify's travel portal.

Sify used to run the i-Way chain of Internet cafes. In 2002, Sify introduced wireless last mile connections with speeds up to 256 kbit/s. By August 2003, it had over 1,000 i-Way cyber cafes in India. In December 2003, Sify launched video-conferencing facilities in its Internet cafes.

In 2004, Sify, with Level Up! Games, launched an MMORPG. In June 2004, the Supreme Court of India set a legal precedent regarding domain names in the Satyam Infoway Ltd. v. Sifynet Solutions Pvt. Ltd. lawsuit.

In November 2005, Satyam Computer Services sold its remaining 31.61% shares in Sify to Infinity Capital Ventures, which is owned by Raju Vegesna, for US$62.62 million.

== See also ==
- Satyam Infoway Ltd. v. Sifynet Solutions Pvt. Ltd.
- Mahindra Satyam
