= Erven Warnink BV v J Townend & Sons (Hull) Ltd =

Erven Warnink BV v J. Townend & Sons (Hull) Ltd
- Citation: [1979] AC 731

Erven Warnink BV v J. Townend & Sons (Hull) Ltd, [1979] AC 731, [1980] R.P.C. 31, – also known as the Advocaat case – is a leading decision of the House of Lords that further developed the common law tort of extended passing off for the Commonwealth as originally established in Bollinger v. Costa Brava. Prior to this case "collective goodwill", as required for an action in passing off, only applied to names indicating geographic origin. The Court held that wares whose name falsely suggests its character or quality can be prevented from selling the product under that name.

== Background ==
Warnink was one of the primary market producers of a Dutch liqueur made from a blend of hen egg yolks, aromatic spirits, sugar, and brandy, which it sold under the name "Advocaat". Townend produced a similar alcoholic drink but using egg and Cyprus wine which it sold as "Keeling's Old English Advocaat".

The Court held that Townend was passing off their goods as those of Warnink. In applying the test for passing off, the Court developed what is known as the "extended" tort of passing off which included any situation where goodwill is likely to be injured by a misrepresentation.

Lord Diplock established five criteria for a claim of extended passing off. There must be:

1. misrepresentation
2. by a trader in the course of trade
3. to prospective customers of his or ultimate consumers of goods or services supplied by him,
4. which is calculated to injure the business or goodwill of another trader, and
5. which causes actual damage to the business or goodwill of the trader bringing the action.

== See also ==
- Satyam Infoway Ltd. v. Sifynet Solutions Pvt. Ltd.- Indian case using the elements of passing off
