= Reckitt & Colman Products Ltd v Borden Inc =

Leading decision of the House of Lords on the tort of passing off

Reckitt & Colman Ltd v Borden Inc
- Transcript: judgment

Reckitt & Colman Ltd v Borden Inc [1990] 1 All ER 873, – also known as the Jif Lemon case – is a leading decision of the House of Lords on the tort of passing off. The Court reaffirmed the three part test (reputation and goodwill, misrepresentation, and damage) in order to establish a claim of passing off.

== Background ==
per Slade LJ: Reckitt, sold lemon juice under the name "Jif Lemon" which came in plastic yellow container that was shaped like a lemon. Borden, a competitor, started to produce lemon juice in a similar lemon-shaped plastic container that was only slightly larger with a flattened side. Reckitt sued Borden for passing off their product as Jif Lemon juice.

At trial the Court found in favour of Reckitt, which was subsequently upheld at the Court of Appeal.

== Opinion of the Court ==
At the House of Lords, the Court upheld the previous judgments.

Lord Oliver, at page 880, reaffirmed the classic test for passing off:

First, he must establish a goodwill or reputation attached to the goods or services which he supplies in the mind of the purchasing public by association with the identifying "get-up" (whether it consists simply of a brand name or a trade description, or the individual features of labelling or packaging) under which his particular goods or services are offered to the public, such that the get-up is recognised by the public as distinctive specifically of the plaintiff's goods or services. Second, he must demonstrate a misrepresentation by the defendant to the public (whether or not intentional) leading or likely to lead the public to believe that goods or services offered by him are the goods or services of the plaintiff. ... Third, he must demonstrate that he suffers or ... that he is likely to suffer damage by reason of the erroneous belief engendered by the defendant's misrepresentation that the source of the defendant's goods or services is the same as the source of those offered by the plaintiff.

== See also ==
- Satyam Infoway Ltd. v. Sifynet Solutions Pvt. Ltd.
