= Zena Cherry =

Canadian journalist (1915–2000)

- Born: 6 October 1915; Prince Albert, Saskatchewan
- Died: 22 January 2000 (aged 84); Toronto, Ontario
- Education: Bishop Strachan School
- Spouse: Westcott Warren Christopher Cherry (m. 1942)

Zena Mary MacMillan Cherry (6 October 1915 – 22 January 2000) was a Canadian journalist known best for her society column "After a Fashion," which she wrote for the Globe and Mail from 1955 to 1987. Cherry was born in Saskatchewan in 1915 and moved with her family to Toronto in 1930. In the 1930s she was a prominent social figure in the city and from 1936 to 1941 she worked as a reporter for the Globe. Cherry returned to the paper in 1955 and began a regular column, reporting on Toronto society. During the 32 years she wrote the column, Cherry gained the reputation as the primary chronicler of Toronto's establishment. She left the Globe in 1987, when her column was taken over by Rosemary Sexton. Cherry died in Toronto on 22 January 2000 at age 84.

== Biography ==
Zena Mary MacMillan was born on 6 October 1915 in Prince Albert, Saskatchewan, to Stanley Butler MacMillan (1888–1959) and Belle Thomas-Brown (18??–1980). Stanley MacMillan was a seventh-generation Canadian. He descended from Colonel Gordon MacMillan, who had come to Canada with the army of James Wolfe in 1759, and later settled in Nova Scotia. Stanley was born in Isaac's Harbour, Nova Scotia, and was educated at Horton Academy in Wolfville. He attended Acadia University and Dalhousie University before transferring to McGill University, where he graduated bachelor of medicine in 1910. Subsequently, he lived in Edinburgh, where he took his Fellowship of the Royal Colleges of Surgeons, and then interned in Peking. Stanley's wife, Belle Thomas-Brown, was born in Harrogate, Yorkshire, and was educated at Harrogate Ladies' College and the Convent of the Sacred Heart in Paris. After Stanley's internship in China, the MacMillans moved to Prince Albert, where he entered practice as medical officer of health and surgeon for the Royal Canadian Mounted Police, regional Indian reserves, and the Canadian Pacific Railway. It was here that Zena was born in 1915. Later they had a son, Horace Goddard MacMillan (1922–1964).

In 1930, the MacMillans moved to Toronto and settled at 372 Russell Hill Road. Zena attended Bishop Strachan School and was part of the class of '34, though she left school after the 1932 year. During the 1934–35 season, she was a débutante. In 1936, she was hired by the Globe and Mail as a society reporter. She wrote her first column under her own name on 17 March 1938, detailing the St. Patrick's Ball held by the Irish Regiment of Canada. Cherry left the paper in 1941 after she was engaged.

On Tuesday, 30 June 1942, MacMillan married Westcott Warren Christopher Cherry (1904–1980). Westcott was a graduate of Upper Canada College, the University of Toronto, and Harvard Business School. He retired in 1968 as sales manager for the Continental Group of Canada. Zena and "Westy," as she called him, did not have children. The Cherrys lived in a home at 200 Heath Street W., which they called Cherrywood, in Forest Hill.

In 1951, she wrote a single column for the Globe. She returned in February 1955 and wrote three columns, then began in late June to write a regular piece. On 30 September 1955, the column was entitled "After a Fashion" for the first time. The column used this titled until August 1977.

Cherry earned the reputation as the primary chronicler of establishment Toronto. Peter C. Newman, author of The Canadian Establishment, wrote,

A very special lady within the Toronto – and Canadian – Establishment's universe is Zena Cherry, the Globe and Mail columnist who chronicles its daily doings and undoings. What makes her column that newspaper's most avidly followed feature is not just that she is the only journalist invited to the social events that really count, but that she has a sixth sense about who is moving up and who is fading from contention. She lives a private life in a Forest Hill Village house filled with a collection of clown models from all over the world. The daughter of a society doctor and brought up in a private school, she is tactful and discreet, and, as one fellow journalist noted, has an 'information-retrieval system that IBM would envy'."

In 1967, Cherry caused a commotion at the paper accidentally. On 21 and 22 September, she published a list of residents at the new Sutton Place, a combined hotel and apartment. Several of the residents were married men who had not told their wives they had taken out apartments in the city, and threatened the Globe with injunctions. In a profile written years later, the author said, "there has been much speculation over the years as to whether Zena knew what she had wrought, but [Richard] Doyle is sure 'she knew exactly what she was doing.' "

Cherry's final column in the Globe appeared on 31 December 1987, detailing a brunch held by Knowlton Nash. By the time she left the paper, she had begun to develop Alzheimer's disease. She was replaced as society reporter by Rosemary Sexton, whose first column appeared on 16 February 1988. After she left the Globe, Cherry was hired by the Financial Post, which went daily in February 1988. Her new column, "Business People," appeared for the first time on 3 February 1988. Cherry wrote five pieces for the Post, with her final column appearing on 9 June 1988.

As her Alzheimer's worsened, Cherry moved to a nursing home in 1990. In 1998 she moved to Kipling Acres, a long-term care home. In 1999, journalist Gerald Hannon visited Cherry at the home as part of an extensive profile he did of her life and career for Toronto Life. The profile was published in the December 1999 issue of the magazine. Cherry died at Kipling Acres on 22 January 2000 at age 84.

Cherry's obituary noted that "she was not a great or even a good writer and was the despair of Globe copy editors, who had to wrestle with the list of names that were her column's raison d'être. Until he retired in 1982, her column seldom appeared without first being 'Martinized' by Martin Lynch, an eccentric genius who was a senior editor with a passion for accuracy that compensated for Mrs. Cherry's shortcomings." Vianney Carriere wrote that "she was one of the most gracious ladies I have ever met. She was one of those infuriating people who are immune to any form of scolding, from the very gentle all the way to flashes of temper. I never could instruct her in a way that did not prompt her to smile a caution at me not to take life too, too seriously."
