= Polaroid Corp. v. Polarad Elects. =

1961 United States trademark infringement case

Polaroid Corp. v. Polarad Elect. Corp. is a key United States legal case from 1961 in trademark infringement law. It is also cited in personality rights particularly around celebrities. The decision argued that trademark infringement is measured by the multi-factor "likelihood of confusion" test. That is, a new mark will infringe on an existing trademark if the new mark is so similar to the original that consumers are likely to confuse the two marks, and mistakenly purchase from the wrong company.

The likelihood of confusion test turns on several factors, including:

- Strength of the plaintiff's trademark
- Degree of similarity between the two marks at issue
- Similarity of the goods and services at issue
- Evidence of actual confusion
- Purchaser sophistication
- Quality of the defendant's goods or services
- Defendant's intent in adopting the mark

This multi-factor test was articulated by Judge Henry Friendly in Polaroid v. Polarad. The criteria are often referred to as the "Polaroid factors."

== See also ==
- List of trademark case law
- Trademark infringement
- Personality rights
- Concurrent use registration ("DuPont factors")
