= Passing off in Canadian law =

In Canada, passing off is both a common law tort and a statutory cause of action under the Canadian Trade-marks Act referring to the deceptive representation or marketing of goods or services by competitors in a manner that confuses consumers. The law of passing off protects the goodwill of businesses by preventing competitors from passing off their goods as those of another.

The protection afforded by the law of passing off protects only the association between a product and its producer and not to the product itself - primarily, it protects a producer's investment in making a product or service distinguishable in the marketplace through the use of distinctive features such as marks, letters, advertising material or slogans, colours, and sounds.

== Basis of passing off claims ==
=== Common law tort of passing off ===
As a common law action, the tort of passing off was developed by courts to protect a plaintiff from harm to their business caused by unfair competition through deceptive marketing or representation. It also protects the public at large by enabling consumers to make informed choices about goods available on the market.

=== Statutory action under the Trade-marks Act ===
Section 7(b) and 7(c) of the Trade-marks Act provides a statutory cause of action parallel to the common law tort of passing off. It can be asserted by a plaintiff whether or not a mark in question has been registered. In particular, the Act states:

7. No person shall ...

(b) direct public attention to his wares, services or business in such a way as to cause or be likely to cause confusion in Canada, at the time he commenced so to direct attention to them, between his wares, services or business and the wares, services or business of another;

(c) pass off other wares or services as and for those ordered or requested;

== Elements of passing off ==
Despite their different origins, both the common law and statutory action for passing off share the same general legal analysis. The Supreme Court of Canada held in Ciba-Geigy Canada Ltd v Apotex Inc that there are three necessary elements in a passing off action:

1. The existence of goodwill,
2. Deception of the public due to a misrepresentation, and
3. Actual or potential harm to the plaintiff

=== Existence of goodwill ===
The first element requires a plaintiff establish that its wares, services or business enjoy a reputation or goodwill in the minds of consumers, that consumers directly associate the plaintiff's wares with a distinctive selling, marketing or identifying feature and that purchasers rely on the feature to distinguish the plaintiff's wares from competitor's wares.

At common law, the nature or form of a distinctive feature is virtually unrestricted: name, slogan, logo, smell, personality, shape, packaging, visual imagery, none of which necessarily have to be a trademark. At this stage of the analysis courts instead focus on the existence and strength of the reputation and the potential for cognitive associations between reputation, feature and wares.

Passing off did not develop to protect monopolies in respect of products but of guises, get-ups, names and symbols which identify the distinctiveness of the source.

=== Deception due to misrepresentation ===
The second element, a misrepresentation that leads to confusion, need not arise from willful misrepresentation or deceit. It may also arise from careless or negligent misrepresentation. The analysis at this stage involves assessing visual and auditory resemblances between the two distinctive features, geographical overlap of reputations, and the degree to which the plaintiff and defendant directly compete in a market or trade.

In Ciba-Geigy, the Supreme Court recognized that the evaluation of the likelihood of confusion ought to be in relation to ordinary purchasers, including all purchasers along the supply chain affected by the passing off, but that purchasers nearer to the source may be less likely to be confused.

=== Actual or potential harm ===
The third element requires a plaintiff show either actual loss or a real prospect of loss in order to obtain proper redress from a passing off claim. A plaintiff in a passing off action does not have to prove any customer was actually misled or any actual damages sustained; an attempt to mislead the public and potential damage to reputation or goodwill may suffice. The reputation and goodwill enjoyed by a brand or business are considered valuable commercial assets and if damaged may cause commercial and financial harm.

== Differences between common law and statutory passing off ==
The statutory action under section 7 of the Trade-marks Act has been described by Chief Justice Bora Laskin of the Supreme Court of Canada as "a statutory statement of the common law action of passing off". However, although the statutory action shares the same elements as the common law action, there are important differences in the scope of protection, applicability, jurisdiction, and remedies available to plaintiffs depending on the choice of action.

=== Applicability to subject matter ===
A statutory action under section 7 of the Trade-marks Act requires that the subject matter in question be a "trade-mark" as defined in section 2 of the Trade-marks Act. A "trade-mark" is defined in the Act as:

(a) a mark that is used by a person for the purpose of distinguishing or so as to distinguish wares or services manufactured, sold, leased, hired or performed by him from those manufactured, sold, leased, hired or performed by others,
(b) a certification mark,
(c) a distinguishing guise, or
(d) a proposed trade-mark;

While trademarks can be protected whether they are registered or unregistered, subject matter that does not fall within the definition of "trade-mark" in the Act cannot be protected by the statute. Thus, certain distinguishing features such as sounds, scents, and holograms that may not traditionally fall under the definition of "trade-mark" in Canadian law can still be protected through a common law passing off claim provided the elements of the tort are satisfied.

=== Jurisdiction ===
A common law passing off claim, as a matter relating to property and civil rights, can only be brought in a provincial superior court. As such, a successful common law action is only enforceable within the province where the claim was heard.

An action under section 7 of the Trade-marks Act can be brought in either Federal Court or in a provincial superior court due to the concurrent jurisdiction granted in section 20(2) of the Federal Courts Act. A judgment rendered by the Federal Court is enforceable throughout Canada.

=== Effect of trademark registration ===
Registration under the Trade-marks Act affirms, recognizes and extends registrants' positive rights to use the registered marks and provides registrants with an absolute defence to a passing off cause of action. It was held in Molson Canada v Oland Brewery Ltd that a plaintiff's only recourse against a registered mark is to attack the validity of the registration.

Critics of the Ontario Court of Appeal's interpretation of the Act in Molson argue that giving priority to registration strays from a fundamental precept of trade-mark law that owners' rights derive from use, not registration.

However, even under the Act it is not correct to say that registration makes a person the owner of a trademark. Registration procedures require that at the time of registration the applicant already own the rights to use the unregistered mark. The administrative hurdles for a trademark application serve as a screening mechanism for ensuring only eligible and owned marks are registered. A registered mark effectively creates a presumption that the mark is distinctive, valid and owned by the registered owner. Post-registration proceedings to have registration expunged are available under section 57 and 18 of the Act.

== Justification for protection against passing off ==
The purpose of the tort and statutory protection against passing off is twofold: first, it protects the plaintiffs' proprietary rights in the goodwill of their business; and second, it protects the public interest in ensuring that consumers are not misled as to the source of goods or services. In this respect, passing off encroaches on both competition law and consumer protection law.

Professor David Vaver suggests generally that "[t]he basic theory of the tort is to prevent the disruption of economic relations by deliberate or innocent misrepresentations that deceive or confuse consumers in their marketplace decisions." Vaver also notes the centrality and complementarity of both purposes in the tort of passing off and trade-mark law:

The role of passing-off is therefore to rectify the likely harms one trader suffers from the acts of another that mistakenly deflect consumers from dealing with the former or his products or services. Although the tort grew up to protect the interests of traders rather than consumers, the less it works to prevent consumer confusion, the more it becomes merely a law protecting traders from unfair competition. That goal may be what other torts, such as conspiracy or unlawful interference with economic relations, and Competition Act provisions regulating false and misleading advertising practices aim at. Passing-off need not replicate their aspirations.

=== Protection against competition ===
In Ciba-Geigy the Supreme Court of Canada explained the purpose of the law. In exploring the function of passing off as an action against competition, the Court cited Salmond on Torts with endorsement:

[t]he courts have wavered between two conceptions of a passing off action — as a remedy for the invasion of a quasi-proprietary right in a trade name or trade mark, and as a remedy, analogous to the action on the case for deceit, for invasion of the personal right not to be injured by fraudulent competition. The true basis of the action is that the passing off injures the right of property in the plaintiff, that right of property being his right to the goodwill of his business.

The Court went on to say:

The purpose of the passing‑off action is thus also to prevent unfair competition. One does not have to be a fanatical moralist to understand how appropriating another person's work, as that is certainly what is involved, is a breach of good faith.

However, the action of passing off (and the law of trademarks in general) is not a substitute for unfair competition laws. The Supreme Court noted in a subsequent case, Kirkbi AG v. Ritvik Holdings Inc. (popularly known as the Lego/Mega Bloks case), that "the purpose of a trade-mark ... is the protection of the distinctiveness of the product, not of a monopoly on the product." Furthermore, "trade-marks law is not intended to prevent the competitive use of utilitarian features of products, but ... fulfills a source-distinguishing function."

=== Protection for consumers ===
While the law of passing off historically developed to protect sellers of goods and services, it has also taken on a dimension of consumer protection. In Mattel Inc v 3894207 Canada Inc (a case involving the Barbie trademark), the Supreme Court commented on this aspect:

However, whatever their commercial evolution, the legal purpose of trade-marks continues (in terms of s. 2 of the Trade-marks Act, R.S.C. 1985, c. T-13) to be their use by the owner "to distinguish wares or services manufactured, sold, leased, hired or performed by him from those manufactured, sold, leased, hired or performed by others". It is a guarantee of origin and inferentially, an assurance to the consumer that the quality will be what he or she has come to associate with a particular trade-mark (as in the case of the mythical "Maytag" repairman). It is, in that sense, consumer protection legislation.

Due to the nature of trademark law as a consumer protection measure, there is some debate as to whether "post-sale confusion" (as in the case of a consumer knowingly purchasing counterfeit goods but fooling others into thinking they are the real thing) should be an actionable trademark infringement or considered under the tort of passing off.

Some observers suggest that trademark law would be better served and more consistent by making post-sale confusion an actionable infringement. Others suggest that post-sale confusion should not be actionable, or that other laws may be better suited to protect manufacturers from counterfeit goods. In Canada, post-sale confusion is not a cause for action under either the Trade-marks Act or the common law tort of passing off.
