= Rosemary Sexton =

Canadian author and former columnist (born 1946)

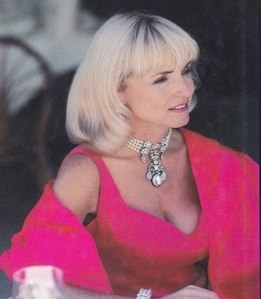
- Born: 20 December 1946 (age 79); Haileybury, Ontario
- Education: Havergal College ('64); Laurentian University (BA 1968); University of Toronto (BA 1973); York University (MA 1976); Osgood Hall (LLB 1976)
- Spouse: J. Edgar Sexton (m. 1979)
- Website: rosemarysexton.com

Rosemary Sexton (née Robinson; born 20 December 1946) is a Canadian author and former columnist for The Globe and Mail. She is the author of the books The Glitter Girls, Confessions of a Society Columnist and Home Before Dark. During her career at The Globe and Mail, she was known as Canada's most influential social columnist.

== Biography ==
Sexton was born in 1946 in Haileybury, Ontario, and attended Haileybury High School and Havergal College. She enrolled in Modern Languages and Literature at the University of Toronto in 1965. At the end of her first year she married Murray Black and moved with him to Sudbury, where she transferred to Laurentian University and graduated in 1968. Sexton began her career in education after attending the Ontario College of Education. After teaching high school for five years, she entered Osgoode Hall Law School where she obtained an LLB in 1976, the same year she received an MA in English from York University.

Sexton was called to the Ontario Bar in 1978 and worked as a tax lawyer before becoming a censor for the Ontario Censor Board. In 1979 she married J. Edgar Sexton (1936–2019), a prominent lawyer. She left the field of law and became a stay-at-home mother, where she spent about 10 years prior to starting her writing career. During that decade, she served on the board of multiple charities including Family Day Care Services, Canadian Psychiatric Awareness Committee, Toronto Pops Orchestra, Wellesley Hospital Volunteer Committee, and the Toronto Symphony Women's Committee.

Sexton's career in writing began when she became a columnist for The Globe and Mail in 1988. She was hired to succeed Zena Cherry and wrote a society column three times a week until 1993. It was in 1993 that she published the book The Glitter Girls, a Canadian bestseller, and followed up with the book Confessions of a Society Columnist in 1995. Home Before Dark was published in May 2014.

In addition to her work at The Globe and Mail and her published works, she was a regular contributor to the National Post as well as writing for Maclean's Magazine.

== Bibliography ==
- 1995, Confessions of a Society Columnist, Macmillan Canada, ISBN 978-0771573651
- 1993, The Glitter Girls, Macmillan, ISBN 978-0771590085
- 2014, Home Before Dark, Kayak Press, ISBN 978-0-9921081-0-6

== See also ==
- List of newspaper columnists
