= Perry v Truefitt =

1842 UK legal case on trademark case law

- Decided: 1842
- Citation: 6 Beav. 66, 49 E.R. 749

Case history
- Related action: passing off

Keywords
- Tort law

Perry v Truefitt (1842) 6 Beav. 66 is the English case in which the tort of passing off was first articulated by the court.

== Background ==
Mr Leathart made a hair treatment product and showed the mixing process to Mr Perry, a perfumer and hairdresser, who decided to call the mixture "Medicated Mexican Balm" and marketed the mixture under the title "Perry's Medicated Mexican Balm".

Mr Truefitt, one of Perry's competitors, made a product that was very similar to Perry's mixture, which he marketed under the name "Truefitt's Medicated Mexican Balm", using bottles and labels that looked like Perry's product.

Perry filed a bill against Truefitt, arguing that the name "Medicated Mexican Balm" was valuable to his business and that he should have exclusive right to prevent others from using it.

== Decision ==
The Court denied Perry the right to the name. However, Lord Longdale held that misrepresentation can be grounds for an injunction, stating that "a man is not to sell his own goods under the pretence that they are the goods of another man".

== See also ==
- List of trademark case law
