= Canadian intellectual property law =

Regulation of intellectual property

Canadian intellectual property law governs the regulation of the exploitation of intellectual property in Canada. Creators of intellectual property gain rights either by statute or by the common law. Intellectual property is governed both by provincial and federal jurisdiction, although most legislation and judicial activity occur at the federal level.

== Jurisdiction ==
Under the Constitution Act, 1867, patent and copyright law are the exclusive jurisdiction of the Federal Government of Canada. While trademarks and industrial design are not specifically mentioned by the Constitution Act, the federal government has enacted legislation governing both. Canadian courts have upheld these pieces of legislation as being properly under the federal government's control.

== Intellectual property rights ==
=== Copyright ===
Protections for copyright are governed by the Copyright Act of Canada. The Act was first passed in 1921, and has been amended several times over the years.

==== Purpose ====
Older Canadian case law took a strict approach- as found in Compo Co. Ltd v. Blue Crest Music. It was held that "Copyright legislation simply creates rights and obligations upon the terms and in the circumstances set out in the statute… The legislation speaks for itself and the actions of the appellant must be measured according to the terms of the statute."

However, the Supreme Court of Canada held in Théberge v. Galerie d'Art du Petit Champlain Inc. that Canadian copyright law is primarily utilitarian. It finds its purpose in promoting the public interest through providing incentives for the creation and dissemination of expressive works. This balance is reached by recognizing the creator's rights, while also recognizing their limited nature. It is recognized that "it would be as inefficient to overcompensate artists and authors for the right of reproduction as it would be self-defeating to undercompensate them." This is contrasted by the American approach in Feist Publications Inc. v. Rural Tel. Co. Ltd. that focuses on public interest without consideration of obtaining a just reward to the creator.

=== Patents ===
A patent gives inventors the right to exclude others from making, using, or selling an invention. A patented invention must be something new, useful, and ingenious. Patents can be obtained for products, apparatuses, manufacturing processes, chemical compositions, and significant improvements to existing inventions. Patents may not generally be obtained for scientific principles, abstract theorems, ideas, methods of conducting business, computer programs, and medical treatments. Some exceptions have been made. Patents are protected in Canada by the Patent Act (R.S.C., 1985, c. P-4).

=== Trademarks ===
A trademark is a word, symbol, or design used to identify wares or services of a person or company. Trademarks are protected in Canadian law by the Trade-marks Act (R.S.C., 1985, c. T-13).

=== Industrial design ===
An industrial design is the fixed, visible shape, pattern, or ornamentation applied to a useful article that is mass-produced. Industrial designs are protected in Canadian law by the Industrial Design Act (R.S.C., 1985, c. I-9).

=== Integrated circuit topographies ===
An integrated circuit topography is the 3-dimensional configuration of the layers of semiconductors, metals, insulators, and other materials used to implement an integrated circuit. Integrated circuit topographies are protected in Canadian law by the Integrated Circuit Topography Act (S.C. 1990, c. 37).

=== Trade secrets ===
Trade secrets are a type of intellectual property that consists of certain information, expertise or know-how that has been developed or acquired by firms. This knowledge frequently gives firms their competitive edge in the market and it has to be kept as a secret. In Canada any information that a firm or its employees produces or acquires for the purpose of the firm's business can constitute confidential information that courts are willing to protect. All that is required is that the creator of the information “has used his brain and thus produced a result which can be produced by somebody who goes through the same process”. Trade secrets are generally considered to include information set out, contained or embodied in, but not limited to, a formula, pattern, plan, compilation, computer program, method, technique, process, product, device or mechanism; it may be information of any sort; an idea of a scientific nature, or of a literary nature, as long as they grant an economical advantage to the business and improve its value. Additionally, there must be some element of secrecy. Matters of public knowledge or of general knowledge in an industry cannot be the subject-matter of a trade secret. While most areas of Canadian intellectual property law are within the purview of Parliament and the Federal government, the Supreme Court of Canada ruled in MacDonald v. Vapor Canada Ltd. that civil remedies pertaining to trade secrets fall within the provincial power over property and civil rights.
