= Functionality doctrine =

Prevention of trademarking a product's features

Under United States trademark law, the functionality doctrine provides that product features that are functional cannot be protected as trademarks. A product feature is considered functional if it is essential to the product’s use or purpose, or if it has an impact on the product’s cost or quality. The purpose of the doctrine is to encourage legitimate competition by ensuring a balance between trademark law and patent law.

A key case illustrating the functionality doctrine is Traffix Devices, Inc. v. Marketing Displays, Inc. (2001). In this case, the Supreme Court held that a dual-spring design for a road sign was not eligible for trade dress protection—a category within trademark law—because it served a purpose beyond “informing consumers that the sign stands are made by” the plaintiff.

There are two branches of the functionality doctrine: utilitarian functionality and aesthetic functionality. The rationale behind functionality doctrine is that product markets would not be truly competitive if newcomers could not make a product with a feature that consumers demand. Utilitarian functionality provides grounds to deny federal trademark protection to product features which do something useful. Patent law, not trademark, protects useful processes, machines, and material inventions. Patented designs are presumed to be functional until proven otherwise. Aesthetic functionality provides grounds to deny trademark protection to design features which are included to make the product more aesthetically appealing and commercially desirable. Aesthetic features are within the purview of copyright law, which provides protection to creative and original works of authorship.

== Utilitarian Functionality ==
Courts will look to the following factors when determining utilitarian functionality:

- Whether a feature is essential to the use or purpose of the product; or
- Whether a feature affects the cost or quality of the product; or
- Whether granting of trademark for the exclusive use of the feature would put competitors at a significant non-reputation related disadvantage

As of 2014 the federal circuit courts are split on their utilitarian functionality analysis. Most circuits, such as the Fifth Circuit and the Sixth Circuit follow the Supreme Court's analysis in TrafFix Devices, Inc. v. Marketing Displays, Inc., which focuses on whether the feature is essential to the use or purpose of the product. The Federal Circuit in contrast focuses its analysis on whether permitting a product feature to be trademarked would impair competitors.

== Aesthetic Functionality ==
In the United States, the “functionality” doctrine exists to stop a party from obtaining exclusive trade dress or trademark rights in the functional features of a product or its packaging. The doctrine developed as a way to preserve the division between what trademark law protects and areas that are better protected by patent or copyright law. Thus, the functionality doctrine serves to prevent trademark owners from inhibiting legitimate competition

When the aesthetic development of the good is intended to enhance the design and make the product more commercially desirable, trademark protection may be denied because the consumer is drawn to the design. The distinctiveness of the mark serves to identify the product rather than the source, and trademark protection becomes inappropriate. The underlying theory as aesthetics become integrated with functionality, the resulting product strongly resembles product design, which may receive no trademark protection absent secondary meaning.

This defense is generally seen in the fashion industry. Clothing brands can only be protected if they've acquired secondary meaning, and most of clothing design is held to be functional and is afforded no protection.

== See also ==
- Idea-expression divide
- Trade dress
