= Mattel Inc v 3894207 Canada Inc =

- Supreme Court of Canada

Hearing: October 18, 2005 Judgment: June 2, 2006
- Full case name: Mattel, Incorporated v. 3894207 Canada Incorporated
- Citations: 2006 SCC 22, [2006] 1 S.C.R. 772
- Docket No.: 30839
- Prior history: Appealed from the Federal Court of Appeal
- Ruling: Mattel appeal dismissed

Court membership
- Chief Justice: Beverley McLachlin; Puisne Justices: John C. Major, Michel Bastarache, Ian Binnie, Louis LeBel, Marie Deschamps, Morris Fish, Rosalie Abella, Louise Charron

Reasons given
- Majority: Binnie J., joined by McLachlin CJ., Bastarache, Deschamps, Fish, Abella, Charron JJ.
- Concurrence: LeBel J.
- Major J. took no part in the consideration or decision of the case.

Mattel Inc v 3894207 Canada Inc [2006] 1 S.C.R. 722, 2006 SCC 22 is a leading decision of the Supreme Court of Canada on the infringement of famous trade-mark names. The Court found that Mattel Inc. could not enforce the use of their trade-marked name "BARBIE" against a restaurant named "Barbie's".

== Background ==
Barbie's restaurant, a Montreal chain of "bar-and-grill" type restaurants catering primarily to adults, applied to register the trade-mark "Barbie's" and an associated design with respect to "restaurant services, take-out services, catering and banquet services". Mattel Inc. owns the "Barbie" trade-mark, and has a worldwide reputation for Barbie dolls and accessories targeted primarily at girls aged 3 to 11 years old. Mattel Inc. opposed the application to register "Barbie's" on the basis that it would cause confusion in the marketplace. The applicant had the burden of satisfying the Trade-marks Opposition Board of the Canadian Intellectual Property Office that if "Barbie's" and Mattel's "Barbie" were used in the same geographic area there would be no confusion in the marketplace. The Trade-marks Opposition Board rejected Mattel's opposition and allowed the registration, finding that the applicant's trade-mark, "Barbie's", was not likely to be confused with Mattel's Barbie trade-mark. The Federal Court and Federal Court of Appeal both upheld the Trade-marks Opposition Board's decision. Mattel Inc. appealed to the Supreme Court of Canada.

== Lower court rulings ==
=== Trade-Marks Opposition Board ===
The Board found that there was not a strong likelihood of consumer confusion. The Board based its decision on the fact that Mattel presented no evidence of actual confusion (although it was not required to), the mark had a low degree of inherent distinctiveness (as it is a short form of the name "Barbara"), and the nature of the uses by the two parties were very different.

=== Federal Court ===
Mattel appealed the Board's ruling to the Federal Court. The Federal Court decided that the trade-mark "Barbie" by Mattel is not iconic enough to cause consumer confusion. Instead, it found that all factors must be considered, including that of the nature of the wares. The judge found the wares to be quite different, and as a result dismissed the appeal.

=== Federal Court of Appeal ===
Mattel appealed to the Federal Court of Appeal. The Court of Appeal found no error by the Federal Court, and dismissed the appeal. Specifically, it found that the Federal Court judge was correct to reject a survey that showed merely a possibility of confusion and not the likelihood of confusion.

== Supreme Court ruling ==
Binnie, J. wrote the opinion to which seven other justices joined. LeBel, J. wrote a concurring opinion.

=== Issue ===
The issue addressed was whether Mattel Inc., owner of the Barbie trade-mark, could prevent a small chain of Montreal-based restaurants from registering the name "Barbie's" with the Intellectual Property Office, based on the likelihood of confusion in the marketplace between the two names.

=== Holding ===
The Supreme Court of Canada upheld the decision of the Trade-marks Opposition Board that the use of the "Barbie" name for the Montreal-based restaurant would not likely create confusion in the marketplace with Mattel Inc.'s "Barbie" trade-mark, and allowed its registration.

=== Reasons of the court ===
Binnie held that the standard of review applicable to the Trade-marks Opposition Board's decision was reasonableness, based on the test set out in Dr Q v College of Physicians and Surgeons of British Columbia [2003] 1 SCR 226. Section 6(2) of the Trade-marks Act states that trade-mark confusion occurs if using two trade-marks in the same area would be likely to lead to the inference that the goods or services associated with those trade-marks are manufactured, sold, leased, hired or performed by the same person, whether or not the wares or services are of the same general class.

To determine whether the restaurant trade-mark "Barbie's" led to confusion in the marketplace with Mattel's "Barbie" trade-mark, Binnie considered the five factors set out in Section 6(5) of the Trade-marks Act. Depending on the surrounding circumstances of each case, the different factors may be weighted differently. Binnie clarified that the appropriate perspective in which to weigh these five factors is that of an "ordinary casual consumer somewhat in a hurry". Binnie held that the applicant had shown on a balance of probabilities that confusion was not likely to occur in the marketplace between "Barbie's" restaurant and Mattel's "Barbie" dolls.

==== Determining trade-mark confusion ====
Binnie held that the word "Barbie", while an everyday expression commonly used as the short-form of the name "Barbara", had acquired a strong secondary meaning associated with Mattel's Barbie dolls, and was therefore considerably distinct. In contrast, the mark applied for by Barbie's restaurant was only somewhat known in the surrounding area of Montreal. Since Mattel's trade-mark has been widely publicized since the early 1960s, while Barbie's restaurant has only existed since 1992, Binnie determined that Mattel's trade-mark had deeper roots.

Binnie found that the doll business attracts different clientele with different tastes than the restaurant business. Binnie determined that it was difficult to see the basis on which consumers would arrive at the mistaken inference that Barbie's restaurants were associated with Mattel's Barbie dolls and accessories. Binnie held that "the parties operate in different and distinct channels of trade within which their respective wares and services do not intermingle." Binnie found that although both marks use the name "Barbie", "Barbie's" restaurant uses the name alongside a design. Binnie determined that when Mattel's packaging and advertising of Barbie is considered, there is considerable resemblance to the mark for Barbie's restaurant.

==== Other surrounding circumstances ====
Binnie stated that lack of any evidence of actual confusion is another circumstance that can be taken into account, while the intention, or mens rea, of the creators of Barbie's restaurant is irrelevant.

==== Famous brands ====
Though Binnie recognized that some marks become so famous that their use with any wares or services may be infringement, he found that "Barbie" did not hold such a strong mark. However, in determining how broad the scope of the trade-mark protection should be, Binnie stressed the importance of courts considering the totality of the circumstances.

==== Resemblance ====
Resemblance between trade-marks is not required to prove trade-mark confusion in the marketplace. Confusion may arise even when trade-marks are related to products or services in different classes of the marketplace.

== See also ==
- List of Supreme Court of Canada cases (McLachlin Court)
- List of Supreme Court of Canada cases
- Kirkbi AG v Ritvik Holdings Inc, a related case from the previous year.
- A moron in a hurry, the unlikely confusion of distinct products or services, established as case law in the United Kingdom in 1979
