= Abercrombie & Fitch Co. v. Hunting World, Inc. =

American legal case

- Court: United States Court of Appeals for the Second Circuit
- Full case name: Abercrombie & Fitch Company v. Hunting World Incorporated
- Argued: September 18, 1975
- Decided: January 16, 1976
- Citations: 537 F.2d 4; 189 U.S.P.Q. 759

Case history
- Subsequent history: Opinion on Limited Rehearing, February 26, 1976

Court membership
- Judges sitting: Henry Friendly, William Homer Timbers, Murray Irwin Gurfein

Case opinions
- Majority: Friendly, joined by a unanimous court

Laws applied
- Lanham Act

In United States trademark law, Abercrombie & Fitch Co. v. Hunting World, 537 F.2d 4 (2nd Cir. 1976) established the spectrum of trademark distinctiveness in the US, breaking trademarks into classes which are accorded differing degrees of protection. Courts often speak of marks falling along the following "spectrum of distinctiveness," also known within the US as the "Abercrombie classification" or "Abercrombie factors". The lawsuit was brought by Abercrombie & Fitch Co. against Hunting World, Inc. regarding Abercrombie's trademark on the word "Safari", and resulting in Abercrombie's loss of the trademark.

== The spectrum of distinctiveness ==
The Abercrombie court determined that descriptive words can get trademark protection if they develop a secondary meaning. The protection only exists for source-designating uses of the word, not descriptive or generic uses of the word.

=== Fanciful marks ===
A fanciful / inherently distinctive trademark is prima facie registrable, and comprises an entirely invented or "fanciful" sign. For example, "Kodak" had no meaning before it was adopted and used as a trademark in relation to goods, whether photographic goods or otherwise. Invented marks are neologisms which will not previously have been found in any dictionary.

=== Arbitrary marks ===
An arbitrary trademark is usually a common word which is used in a meaningless context (e.g. "Apple" for computers). Such marks consist of words or images which have some dictionary meaning before being adopted as trademarks, but which are used in connection with products or services unrelated to that dictionary meaning. Arbitrary marks are also immediately eligible for registration. Salty would be an arbitrary mark if it used in connection with e.g. telephones such as in Salty Telephones, as the term "salt" has no particular connection with such products.

=== Suggestive marks ===
A suggestive trademark tends to indicate the nature, quality, or a characteristic of the products or services in relation to which it is used, but does not describe this characteristic, and requires imagination on the part of the consumer to identify the characteristic. Suggestive marks invoke the consumer's perceptive imagination. An example of a suggestive mark is Blu-ray, a new technology of high-capacity data storage.

=== Descriptive marks ===
A descriptive mark is a term with a dictionary meaning which is used in connection with products or services directly related to that meaning. An example might be Salty used in connection with saltine crackers or anchovies. Such terms are not registrable unless it can be shown that distinctive character has been established in the term through extensive use in the marketplace (see further below). Lektronic was famously refused protection by the USPTO on ground of being descriptive for electronic goods.

=== Generic terms ===
A generic term is the common name for the products or services in connection with which it is used, such as "salt" when used in connection with sodium chloride. A generic term is not capable of serving the essential trademark function of distinguishing the products or services of a business from the products or services of other businesses, and therefore cannot be afforded any legal protection. This is because there has to be some term which may generally be used by anyone—including other manufacturers—to refer to a product without using some organization's proprietary trademark. Marks which become generic after losing distinctive character are known as genericized trademarks.
