= J. Edgar Sexton =

Canadian judge (1936–2019)

- Born: 26 October 1936; Ottawa, Ontario, Canada
- Died: 1 November 2019 (aged 83); Brockville, Ontario, Canada
- Education: Queen's University (BSc 1959); University of Western Ontario (LLB 1962)
- Spouse: Rosemary Robinson (m. 1979)

John Edgar Sexton (28 October 1936 – 1 November 2019) was a Canadian judge of the Canadian Federal Court of Appeal. He died at his home in Brockville, Ontario, on 1 November 2019, at the age of 83.
