= J. D. Denis Pelletier =

Canadian Federal Court of Appeal

Personal details
- Born: December 4, 1948 (age 77) Rosthern, Saskatchewan

J. D. Denis Pelletier (born December 4, 1948) is a retired judge of the Canadian Federal Court of Appeal.
