= Canadian trademark law =

Canadian trademark law provides protection to marks by statute under the Trademarks Act and also at common law. Trademark law provides protection for distinctive marks, certification marks, distinguishing guises, and proposed marks against those who appropriate the goodwill of the mark or create confusion between different vendors' goods or services. A mark can be protected either as a registered trademark under the Act or can alternately be protected by a common law action in passing off.

== Overview ==
=== The scope of Canadian trademarks law ===
A trademark is only protected to the extent that it is used by a person to distinguish a product or service from another. Trademarks do not give exclusive rights to a symbol, for instance, but only for the symbol in relation to a particular use in order to distinguish the product from others.

Trademarks help potential customers to identify the source of products and thus have a significant impact on trade, especially when product identity is marketed as an extension of the customers' personal identity.

Although any name or symbol could be protected under trademark law, there are issues concerning the limits of that protection. For instance, enforcing protection of a mark and its perception is questionable where there is no actual confusion for consumers. Likewise, protecting a mark against all criticism or allusions, as if it were an actual person, is controversial since trying to protect marks at all costs could be harmful to free speech and free trade.

=== Statutory definition of trademarks in Canadian law ===
The Act gives the following definition for the scope of trademarks:

"trademark" means:

(a) a mark that is used by a person for the purpose of distinguishing or so as to distinguish wares or services manufactured, sold, leased, hired or performed by him from those manufactured, sold, leased, hired or performed by others,
(b) a certification mark
(c) a distinguishing guise, or
(d) a proposed trademark

Certification marks are used in classifying the nature of a good or service (e.g., a Fair Trade Certified logo).

A distinguishing guise can only be registered if it "is not likely unreasonably to limit the development of any art or industry". In Kirkbi AG v. Ritvik Holdings Inc., the Supreme Court of Canada declared:

43. ... the Act clearly recognizes that it does not protect the utilitarian features of a distinguishing guise. In this manner, it acknowledges the existence and relevance of a doctrine of long standing in the law of trademarks. This doctrine recognizes that trademarks law is not intended to prevent the competitive use of utilitarian features of products, but that it fulfills a source-distinguishing function. This doctrine of functionality goes to the essence of what is a trademark.

Kirkbi clarifies that the mere purpose of a product, however unique, cannot be subject of a trademark. Such utilitarian features fall more properly within the realm of patent law. The distinct look and feel of a product, however, can attract trademark protection. In Ciba-Geigy, the Supreme Court of Canada held that trademark infringement had occurred when the size, shape, and colour of Metoprolol tablets (used to treat hypertension) were mimicked by two competitors with comparable products.

Canada, unlike the US, does not have a provision governing notice by a trademark owner of the existence of a trademark, other than in the case of a licensee being allowed by an owner to use one. The use of symbols such as ™ or ® is therefore optional but advised, accompanied by a full written notice.

=== The purpose of trademarks law ===
Trademark law appears to be divided in two types of purposes:

- To protect the public so that it may be confident that, in purchasing a product bearing a particular trademark which it favorably knows, it will get the product which it asks for and wants to get.
- Where the owner of a trademark has spent energy, time, and money in presenting to the public the product, he is protected in his investment from its misappropriation by pirates and cheats.

The Supreme Court of Canada has emphasized that the tort of passing off was intended to protect the property right that plaintiffs had in the goodwill of their business. However, the protection of the public is a priority, and the Supreme Court has also said that trademark law was in fact "consumer protection legislation".

Where a company has adopted a business name that is the same or very similar to that of a competitor, a key consideration is the potential for customers to become confused. Even where a Plaintiff has only used its brand name for a limited period of time and has little in the way of good will, a similarly-named competitor may confuse customers and cause the Plaintiff to lose control of its own reputation, thus justifying damages under the Trademarks Act.

Courts, when interpreting the Act, try to achieve a balance between the rights of the owner and those of others. This means taking into account the public interest in free trade and expression.

=== Trademarks and intellectual property ===
According to the Supreme Court of the United States, trademarks are very different from patents and copyrights to the extent that they require "no fancy or imagination, no genius, no laborious thought". The Supreme Court of Canada calls them "something of an anomaly". Unlike other branches of intellectual property law, protection of trademarks does not necessarily arise from any act of creativity.

Using the term "industrial property" instead of "intellectual property" may be more appropriate when referring to trademarks, which are mainly commercial devices, although the term "property" is still misleading since trademark law does not grant 'owners' the right to exclude others from using it.

== Passing off ==
The primary means of protecting registered trademarks is through an action under the Trademarks Act. For unregistered trademarks, the common law tort of passing off is the primary means by which producers can obtain remedies against a competitor. Section 7(b) and 7(c) of the Trademarks Act also codifies the tort of passing off into federal law.

Most of the law of passing off has been inherited from the UK case law. For a successful action in passing off the claimant must show three things:

1. the existence of goodwill or reputation within an identifiable market area,
2. the other party's use of the mark constitutes misrepresentation of their wares as those of the claimants, and
3. the misrepresentation could potentially or actually did cause harm.

== Trademark registration ==
A mark must be registrable in order to be fully protected under the Trademarks Act. Generally, all visual marks can be registered with the exception of marks that possess certain characteristics prohibited by the Act. Among the prohibited characteristics include:

- marks that are "primarily merely" a name or family name
- marks that can produce confusion with another vendor's mark
- marks that are "clearly descriptive" or "deceptively misdescriptive" of the associated wares or services
- any government, royal, or international marks

=== Advantages of trademark registration ===
According to section 19 of the Act the owner of a valid registered trade mark has the exclusive right to the mark's use throughout Canada in respect of the wares or services for which it is registered. Section 20 provides that no unapproved person may sell, distribute, or advertise wares or services in association with a confusing trademark or trade name and section 22 further prohibits a non-owner from using a registered mark in any manner likely to deteriorate the value of the goodwill attached to the mark.

The common law protects marks by recognizing the owner's right to exclusive uses, subject to the geographical and market boundaries of the owner's established trade reputation. Registration also allows the owner to register in other countries that adhere to the International Convention for the Protection of Industrial Property.

=== Duration and termination ===
Prior to June 17, 2019, a duly registered trademark was valid for fifteen years and could be renewed in perpetuity. On June 17, 2019, amendments to section 46 of the Trademarks Act reduced this validity period to ten years for all future registrations and renewals. The renewable nature of trademark registrations makes it the only form of intellectual property with statutory protections that do not definitively expire. However, sections 44 and 45 of the Act permit the registrar to require, from time to time, owners submit information or evidence regarding the ongoing usage of registered marks. If a trademark is abandoned, shows no evidence of being used or is not renewed, the Registrar of Trademarks may expunge the trademark from the register.

=== The registration process ===
==== Trademark agents, selection, searches ====
Trademark owners typically retain the services of a trademark agent to advise, prepare and file the application to register. Section 12 of the act contains subsections (a)-(i) which list the type of marks not eligible for registration. The ineligibilities are generally designed to ensure adequate distinctiveness and ensure that names, places, people and descriptive or common words are not monopolized through registration. In addition, when a generic product is legally sold by a number of distributors, it is not generally possible for one manufacturer to claim exclusive trademark protection.

The Act also prohibits the registration of any mark connoting association with royalty, government, international agencies, professions, or marks containing obscenity. If a mark is eligible for registration, then trademark agents may conduct searches of registers to determine if any registered mark has similarities that may be confusing. A trademark does not have to be original, but it must be sufficiently distinct. Searches of registers at the Canadian Intellectual Property Office (CIPO), NUANS, and possibly US registers are standard practice.

==== Application to register ====
Section 16 of the Act provides three basic grounds on which an applicant may base their application. First, the mark has been previously used or made known in Canada. Advertising the trademark may be sufficient to satisfy the mark being made known in Canada, even though it has never been used in Canada. Second, the mark has been registered and used in a country party to the international convention. Third, the applicant proposes to use the mark in Canada; since the mark will be registered only after the applicant files a declaration of commenced use of mark in Canada, as per subsection 40(2), the applicant satisfies the requirement of owning the trademark at the time of registration.

==== Post-eligibility process ====
The registrar either finds the mark eligible or ineligible for registration. An owner may appeal the registrar's ineligibility decision to the court. For an eligible mark the next step is for CIPO to issue a notice of the application's approval for advertisement. The application and trademark must then be advertised in the Trademarks Journal for two months, providing a window of opportunity for opponents to file a statement of opposition to the proposed registration. Section 38 of the Act requires opponents to provide detailed specifications of the grounds for opposition, such that the applicant has a fair opportunity to rebut the allegations and meet their onus of satisfying the registrar that registration is warranted.

==== Oppositions to proposed registration ====
Subsection 38(2) provides an opponent with seven grounds on which to base a statement of opposition, which can generally be categorized under the following areas: noncompliance with filing requirements, mark unregistrable (see section 12), applicant is not the owner or the mark lacks distinctiveness. Once the statement of opposition is filed, the proceedings are determined by the Trademarks Opposition Board. Decisions of the Board can be appealed to the Federal Court of Canada.

=== Differences between registered and unregistered marks ===
Registration is costly; however, once the trademark is registered, proving an infringement is easier and therefore possibly less expensive than a common law passing-off action. The rationales behind the two notions also differ: passing off merely protects the disruption of economic relations by misrepresentation, while registration actually sees marks as commodities.

Other differences exist:

- Unlike passing off, registration doesn't require market reputation, although it does require actual use.
- Registration covers Canada as a whole, while passing off is merely local.
- Registration doesn't require proof of damage. It can also allow a claimant to stop the use of similar marks, despite the defendant's disavowal. In passing-off, however, the mark can be used by similar businesses as long as it doesn't lead to confusion. Moreover, disavowal and honesty are taken into account.
- Passing-off requires proof of the existence of reputation each time and action is brought, whereas registration gives a presumption of validity and gives continuous protection against passing-off and infringement in case of normal use of the mark.
- Misrepresentation is required in passing-off, which doesn't protect loss of control for instance, while mere depreciation of goodwill could suffice in registration. However, this distinction is more limited nowadays, since passing off gives protection against loss of control as long as misrepresentation is proved.

Relying on the common law action of passing off is still useful when a symbol cannot be registered or when registration is invalid. Moreover, its flexibility makes it more adequate than the concept of infringement provided by the Act for situations that are not covered by the legislation, for instance misleading practices on the Internet. It also gives more protection to non-profit and public activity than the Act, which is more constraining.

== Economic functions of trademarks ==
Trademarks have two distinct yet related economic functions: the linguistic function and the trust function

=== The linguistic function ===
This function deals with the idea that trademarks help condensing complex information into a single word or symbol, immediately recognizable by consumers. This eventually reduces search costs for customers by simplifying the decision-making process and facilitating exchanges between the seller and the consumers.

=== The trust function ===
There are three classes or attributes of goods:

- search goods (consumers immediately know the quality of the products before buying)
- experience goods (consumers know the quality of the product by consuming it)
- and credence goods (consumers can't assess the quality of a product even after consuming it, because it is often too costly).

A seller will often say that a product carries all three attributes; however, consumers are not able to verify such information and distinguish trustworthy products from non-trustworthy ones. Honest sellers will ask for a more substantial price in order to maintain the quality of the product. But consumers will not be willing to pay more for a supposedly trustworthy product. Eventually, the honest seller will have to exit the market. A market for lemons phenomenon will appear due to this information asymmetry, in which the actual price and the price that consumers are willing to pay decrease.

In this context, trademarks fulfill a trust function to the extent that they provide a more reliable market for consumers, who can't immediately tell if credence goods are trustworthy or not. Honest sellers can develop and provide more desirable products.

=== Relationship between the two functions ===
Although the trust function is more important than the linguistic one, the two functions are closely related. Trademarks can indicate complex attributes that consumers can't verify by themselves, just like a name helps identify a person, but also their attributes.

When the two functions are preserved, a normatively robust rule is created. An example of this is the tort of passing off: passing off usually frustrates both the linguistic function (by increasing search costs for consumers), and the trust function (by creating a "lemons" problem).

On the other hand, when one or both the functions are frustrated, the rule is considered to be normatively weak. For instance, the rule regarding comparative advertising in Canada appears to be inconsistent with both functions to the extent that prohibiting a company to use a competitor's name in order to convey correct information to consumers makes communication less efficient and more costly (linguistic function), and makes it hard for the company to explain why the products it sells are different from the competitor's, which would create a trust problem (trust function)

Why is the trust function more important than the linguistic one? Because frustrating the linguistic function would lead to higher search costs, while frustrating the trust function would cause market failure due to the fact that customers can't tell the products apart anymore.

What happens when two products are virtually indistinguishable, because the brands are very similar for instance? The use of the same word will usually not frustrate the trust function, which is more crucial than the linguistic function. This might produce higher search costs for consumers, but as long as additional information is provided, the trust function is preserved and consumers can still distinguish the two products, although in some cases additional information can create even more confusion.

== Case Law ==
- Kirkbi AG v. Ritvik Holdings Inc., 2005 SCC 65, [2005] 3 SCR 302 (17 November 2005) (the "Lego case")
- Mattel, Inc. v. 3894207 Canada Inc., 2006 SCC 22, [2006] 1 SCR 772 (2 June 2006) (the "Barbie case")
- Veuve Clicquot Ponsardin v. Boutiques Cliquot Ltée, 2006 SCC 23, [2006] 1 SCR 824 (2 June 2006) (the "Veuve Cliquot case")

== See also ==
- Intellectual property law in Canada
- Canadian Intellectual Property Office
- Trademarks Opposition Board
  - Opposition proceedings
  - Section 45 proceedings
- Trademarks Journal
- Trademark symbol
- Official mark
- World Intellectual Property Organization
