= Unregistered trademark =

Identifier of a product made with judicial precedent

An unregistered trademark, sometimes informally called a common law trademark, is an enforceable mark created by a business or individual to signify or distinguish a product or service. It is legally different from a registered trademark granted by statute.

As with registered trademarks, an unregistered trademark utilizes graphics, images, words or symbols, or a combination of such, to signify the distinctiveness or source of a product or service.

In many countries, well-known unregistered trademarks may be protected by a common law passing off tort which prevents traders from passing off their goods or services as that of another. In these jurisdictions, protections for unregistered trademarks are usually weaker than for registered trademarks. However, some countries have no legal protections for unregistered trademarks.

Although not required by law to do so, an unregistered trademark owner can append the mark with the letters "TM" (visualized by the trademark symbol ™). A ™ serves as notice to the public the words or symbols are an unregistered trademark. In contrast, trademarks registered with government agencies may have a registered trademark symbol next to them, such as the ® symbol.

== Legislation by country ==
=== Australia ===
Unregistered trade marks are provided some protection under Australian trademark law. The Trade Marks Act 1995 prohibits the registration of a trademark if "the use of the trade mark in relation to those goods or services would be likely to deceive or cause confusion." Owners of unregistered trademarks may be able to file registration at a later date despite a conflict with an existing registered trademark if they can prove that their unregistered trademark was in use before the other registered one.

=== Bangladesh ===
Bangladeshi law, including Penal Code (1860), the Customs Act (1969), the Consumer's Right Protection Act (2009) and the Bangladesh Standard and Testing Institute Act of 2018 protect unregistered trademarks from infringement on the basis that it is an unfair business practice which deceives consumers and damages the reputation of trademark owners.

=== Canada ===
Canadian trademark law protects unregistered trademarks that have been in continuous commercial use and which have a demonstrable market value in terms of reputation. Owners of unregistered trademarks may attempt to protect themselves from trademark infringement by via passing off actions against others who use their trademarks to deceive consumers.

=== China ===
The trademark law of China has no clear provisions for protection of unregistered trademarks, which has caused a well-recognized problem of unregistered trademarks being registered by other parties in bad faith. In order to combat this bad faith registration problem, China released new regulations in 2019, which prohibits any filing of trademarks in bad faith, and explicitly names trademark trolling as a form of unlawful bad faith; violators can be fined up to 100,000 yuan. Managers working for violators may be held personally liable for a fine of 50,000 yuan, with possible jail time in serious cases. In addition to enforcement against bad faith, Chinese law has also made strides in combatting the problem under the prior use and well-known marks doctrines.

=== European Union ===
There is no legal protection for unregistered trademarks in the trade mark law of the European Union, but its member states may have protection for unregistered marks at the national level.

=== India ===
In Indian trademark law, the first user of an unregistered trademark has priority over a later user who registers the trademark if it can be proven that first use predated trademark registration. Registering a trademark gives the owner the exclusive right to use it, unless another entity's prior use can be established. Owners of unregistered trademarks can not sue for trademark infringement if another party uses their trademark, although they can seek a passing off remedy. In order to do so, the unregistered trademark owner must prove that damage was done to them by another trader taking advantage of the consumer goodwill attached to the trademark.

=== Japan ===
Japanese trademark law has some protections for well-known unregistered trademarks in specific circumstances. Unregistered trademarks which are well-known to consumers and strongly related the original user's goods and services are protected under the Unfair Competition Prevention Law.

=== United States ===
U.S. federal law prohibits an unregistered trademark owner gaining any benefit from using the ® with the trademark, which is used for marks registered with the United States Patent and Trademark Office (USPTO). In contrast to federal registration, unregistered trademarks are usually enforceable only within the geographic region or locale where the trademark owner is using it in business. When an infringement occurs, an unregistered trademark owner may not be able to sue and collect damages or recover attorneys fees, unlike registered trademarks. In those jurisdictions with limited protection to unregistered trademark owners, an unregistered trademark owner's remedies may be limited to injunctive relief (a court order for the defendant to cease and desist from the infringement).

An unregistered trademark may receive protection under the federal Lanham Act (15 U.S.C. § 1125), which includes prohibition against commercial misrepresentation of source or origins of goods. Unlike other trademark statutory provisions, a claim under the Lanham Act may permit a party to recover attorneys' fees and costs.

Some U.S. states consider the first business or individual who uses a trademark to be the owner (called the first use rule), and others consider the owner to be whoever files to register the trademark first (called the first to file rule). Under the first use rule, an unregistered trademark owner can defeat a later-filed federal or state registered trademark, if the unregistered trademark owner can show first use in commerce the date of the registered trademark. Under first to file rules, regardless of use in commerce, the first business or individual who filed for registration of the trademark will take precedence over another party's unregistered use of the trademark, even if their use predates the filing. In first-to-file states this sometimes causes a race to file an application because a granted registration may provide protection to the date the trademark owner first filed the trademark application.
