= TrafFix Devices, Inc. v. Marketing Displays, Inc. =

- Supreme Court of the United States

Argued November 29, 2000 Decided March 20, 2001
- Full case name: TrafFix Devices, Incorporated, Petitioner v. Marketing Displays, Incorporated
- Citations: 532 U.S. 23 (more) 121 S. Ct. 1255; 149 L. Ed. 2d 164; 2001 U.S. LEXIS 2457; 69 U.S.L.W. 4172; 58 U.S.P.Q.2d (BNA) 1001; 2001 Cal. Daily Op. Service 2223; 2001 Daily Journal DAR 2796; 2001 Colo. J. C.A.R. 1496; 14 Fla. L. Weekly Fed. S 135

Holding
- There can be no trademark protection for something that is functional.

Court membership
- Chief Justice William Rehnquist Associate Justices John P. Stevens · Sandra Day O'Connor; Antonin Scalia · Anthony Kennedy; David Souter · Clarence Thomas; Ruth Bader Ginsburg · Stephen Breyer

Case opinion
- Majority: Kennedy, joined by unanimous

TrafFix Devices, Inc. v. Marketing Displays, Inc., 532 U.S. 23 (2001), was a landmark United States Supreme Court decision in the field of trademark law. The case determined that a functional design could not be eligible for trademark protection, and it established a presumption that a patented design is inherently functional.

== Background ==
The plaintiff, Marketing Display, Inc., held patents (US 3662482, US 3646696) for a two-spring design used to stabilize traffic signs in strong winds. Following the expiration of the plaintiff's patents, the defendant, TrafFix Devices, Inc., started producing their own signs utilizing the same design. The plaintiff filed a lawsuit, alleging trade dress infringement based on the imitation of the distinctive design. The central legal issue addressed by the courts was whether trade dress protection could be granted to a product that was previously covered by an expired patent.

== Opinion of the Court ==
The Court, in a unanimous opinion by Justice Anthony Kennedy, held that there can be no trademark protection for something that is functional because that would work as a detriment to competitors based on something other than reputation, which is the key consideration in trademark law.

The Court noted that the plaintiff has the burden of proving that the characteristic for which protection is sought is not functional—but having a patent for a design raises a very strong presumption that the design was functional. A design is functional if it serves any purpose that makes the product work better, or makes the product less expensive to produce. That an alternative design is available does not undercut the functionality of a given design.

Discussing trademarks, we have said “ ‘[i]n general terms, a product feature is functional,’ and cannot serve as a trademark, ‘if it is essential to the use or purpose of the article or if it affects the cost or quality of the article.’ ”. Expanding upon the meaning of this phrase, we have observed that a functional feature is one the “exclusive use of [which] would put competitors at a significant non-reputation-related disadvantage.” . . . Where the design is functional under the Inwood formulation there is no need to proceed further to consider if there is a competitive necessity for the feature.

Here, Justice Kennedy said, the design was clearly functional, and the plaintiff could not carry the burden of proving otherwise because the very characteristic that is sought to be protected by trademark is the one whose functionality was previously sought to be covered by patent.

== See also ==
- List of United States Supreme Court cases, volume 532
- List of United States Supreme Court cases
