= Official mark =

Canadian intellectual property law

An official mark (sometimes denoted by the symbols ^{OM}, ^{M}, or Ⓜ) is a form of intellectual property which exists in Canada under section 9 of the Trade-marks Act, which allows for the protection of names and designs used by Canadian public authorities (including governments and government agencies, Crown corporations, and certain nonprofit organizations) for goods or services.

Official marks are not themselves trademarks, but are a subtype of another category of marks defined in the Trade-marks Act known as "prohibited marks". The Act states that no one can use, in connection with a business, any trademark identical or confusingly similar to a prohibited mark without the permission of the relevant organization.

Like trademarks, official marks (and other prohibited marks) are filed with the Canadian Intellectual Property Office to be published in the Trademarks Journal and are searchable through the Canadian Trade-marks Database.

Unlike Canadian trademarks, official marks do not have to be associated with specific categories of goods or services, and they may only be invalidated on the basis that the holder was not actually a Canadian public authority, or was not publicly using the mark at the time of public notice via the Trademarks Journal.
