= Satyam Infoway Ltd. v. Sifynet Solutions Pvt. Ltd. =

2004 Supreme Court of India trademark case

- Court: Supreme Court of India
- Full case name: Satyam Infoway Ltd. v. Sifynet Solutions Pvt. Ltd.
- Decided: 6 May 2004
- Citation: 2004 (3) AWC 2366 SC

Court membership
- Judges sitting: Ruma Paul, Venkatarama Reddy

Case opinions
- The Indian Trade Marks Act, 1999 is applicable to the regulation of domain names
- Decision by: Ruma Paul

Satyam Infoway Ltd. v. Sifynet Solutions Pvt. Ltd. was the first case to be decided by the Supreme Court of India on the issue of domain name protection, and dealt with two businesses employing variations on the same mark ("Sify") in their respective domain names.

In the case, the Supreme Court pronounced that the Indian Trade Marks Act, 1999 is applicable to the regulation of domain names. The decision in favour of Satyam Infoway was premised on the court's observation that domain names may have all the features of trademarks. The court considered the confusion that may result in the market due to the use of identical or similar domain names. In such a situation, instead of being directed to the website of the legitimate owner of the name, a user could be diverted to the website of an unauthorized user of a similar or identical name. Upon arrival at the unauthorized site, customers might not find the goods or services customarily associated with the mark, and might be led to believe that the legitimate owner was misrepresenting its wares. This could result in the domain name's owner suffering a loss of market share and goodwill.

== Facts ==
The appellant in the Supreme Court action, Satyam Infoway Ltd., alleged that the respondent, Sifynet Solutions Pvt. Ltd., had intentionally registered and operated a domain name that was confusingly similar to one owned by Satyam Infoway. Satyam Infoway claimed that it had in 1999, registered several domain names pertaining to its business: sifynet.com, sifymall.com, sifyrealestate.com, with the Internet Corporation for Assigned Names and Numbers (ICANN) and the World Intellectual Property Organization (WIPO). It submitted that the word "Sify" – which was an amalgam of elements of its corporate name "Satyam Infoway" – was a "fanciful" term, and that it had further garnered substantial goodwill in the market. Meanwhile, Sifynet Solutions had started using the word "Siffy" as part of the domain names under which it carried on internet marketing (namely siffynet.com and siffynet.net), claiming to have registered them with ICANN in 2001.

Satyam Infoway alleged that Sifynet Solutions was attempting to pass off its services as those belonging to Satyam Infoway by using a deceptively similar word as part of its domain name. Satyam Infoway claimed that this would cause confusion in the minds of the relevant consumers, who would mistake the services of Sifynet Solutions as belonging to Satyam Infoway.

Sifynet Solutions contended that unlike a trade mark, the registration of a domain name did not confer an intellectual property right in the name. It averred that a domain name is merely an address on the computer, which allows communications from the consumers to reach the owner of the business, and confers no comparable property rights in the same.

It was a lacuna in the intellectual property laws of India that there existed no regulation to address disputes relating to domain names. Therefore, members of the Internet community asked the courts to apply trade mark law as an effective avenue of redress for their disputes. The High Court responded and held that domain names could be adequately protected under the doctrine of passing off referred to in the Indian law of trade marks. This doctrine was applied to resolve domain name disputes in Rediff Communication Ltd. v. Cyberbooth & Anr. (AIR 2000 Bombay 27), Yahoo Inc. v. Akash OP Aurora [1999 PTC (19) 201], Acqua Minerals Ltd. v. Pramod Borse & Anr. [2001 PTC 619 (Del)], Dr. Reddy's Laboratories Ltd. v. Manu Kosuri [2001 PTC 859 (Del)]. The Supreme Court in Satyam Infoway Ltd. v. Sifynet Solutions Pvt. Ltd., affirmed the law laid down by these various High Courts, and established a modicum of certainty with regard to the law in this contentious sphere.

== City Civil Court ==
Satyam Infoway filed suit in the City Civil Court, Bangalore, and requested a temporary injunction against Sifynet Solutions. The court ruled in favour of Satyam Infoway and granted the temporary injunction. It stated that Satyam Infoway was the prior user of the word "Sify", and that it had garnered immense popularity in respect of the sale of internet and computer services sold under the same. It further found that Sifynet Solutions' domain name was confusingly similar to that of Satyam Infoway, and would consequently create confusion in the minds of the public with respect to the source of the services.

== High Court ==
Sifynet Solutions appealed to the Karnataka High Court, which heard the case. The High Court based its decision on a consideration of where the balance of convenience lay. The High Court stated that Sifynet Solutions had already invested heavily in securing a customer base for the business (about 50,000 members), and would consequently suffer immense hardship and irreparable injury if the court found in Satyam Infoway's favour. It noted that the business that the two parties were involved in were disparate, and therefore there was no possibility of the customers being misled by similar domain names. Further, since Satyam Infoway also had that name to use in trade, the High Court believed that it would not cause them considerable hardship to deny the temporary injunction.

== Supreme Court ==
The Supreme Court, through a bench comprising Justices Ruma Pal and P. Venkatarama Reddi, set aside the decision of the High Court, and ruled in favour of Satyam Infoway. It declared that domain names are subject to the regulatory framework that is applied to trade marks (i.e. the Trade Marks Act, 1999). The court stated that though there is no law in India which explicitly governs the regime of domain names, this state of affairs does not foreclose protection for domain names under the aegis of the Trade Marks Act. Thus, the court determined that domain names are protected under the law relating to passing off as delineated in the Trade Marks Act.

In order to arrive at the Holding, the Supreme Court analogized domain names to trade marks. After an elaboration of sections 2(zb), 2(m), and 2(z), the court stated that a domain name in the contemporary era has evolved from a mere business address to a business identifier. Therefore, a domain name is not merely a portal for internet navigation, but also an instrument which distinguishes and identifies the goods or services of the business, while simultaneously providing the specific internet location. This feature of domain names in the modern era allows them to be likened to trade marks, and concomitantly to be included within the purview of the Trade Marks Act.

=== Passing off ===
The court delineated the elements of an action for passing off that Satyam Infoway would have to prove in order to succeed. Firstly, Satyam Infoway had to prove accumulated goodwill in the name "Sify", such that it would be apparent that the consumers associated the name "Sify" with the services offered by Satyam Infoway. Satyam Infoway discharged this burden by demonstrating that the name "Sify" had acquired immense repute in the market in association with their services. Satyam Infoway argued that it had 840 cyber cafés, five lakh (five hundred thousand) subscribers, and 54 units of presence all over India. Moreover, it adduced evidence to indicate that it was the first Indian internet company to be listed on the NASDAQ stock exchange in 1999, and that it had expended an enormous amount of money towards the same. It further presented several newspaper articles which had specifically referred to Satyam Infoway company as "Sify", and further various advertisements developed to promote their services which had also prominently referred to Satyam Infoway as "Sify".

Secondly, Satyam Infoway had to establish that Sifynet Solutions had misrepresented its services to the consumers, such that a likelihood of confusion was created in the minds of the consuming public that the services offered by Sifynet Solutions belonged to Satyam Infoway.

Thirdly, Satyam Infoway was required to prove that a likelihood of confusion in the minds of consumers would inevitably be a result due to the use of a similar domain name by Sifynet Solutions, and further, that such confusion would cause injury to the public and definite loss to Satyam Infoway. The standard applied by the court to assess likelihood of confusion was that of an unwary consumer of "average intelligence and imperfect recollection". The court expressed the opinion that in the field of internet services, the difference in the nature of services offered by businesses may not be of much consequence due to the method of operation on the internet. The court discussed this facet at length and explained that the accessibility of domain names to a wide spectrum of users underscores the point that similarity in domain names would lead to confusion and also receipt of unsought for services.

=== Distinction between trade mark and domain name ===
The court proceeded to distinguish between the nature of a trade mark and a domain name. It stated that the distinction is important to determine the scope of protection available to the rights of an owner of either of the two. The court indicated that they can be distinguished primarily on the basis of the method of operation. While, a trade mark upon registration in a particular country acquires rights which are purely national in character, the operation of a domain name cannot be contained within a specific country. Thus, due to this facet of domain names, the court expressed the opinion that it would be difficult to protect them effectively under national laws. In this regard, the court expressed that the International Registrars, i.e., WIPO, and ICANN, had provided a modicum of effective protection to domain names.

=== Balance of convenience ===
The Supreme Court disagreed with the High Court on the issue of where the balance of convenience lay. The court stated that no irreparable injury would be caused to Sifynet Solutions by proscribing him from using the domain name. It instead believed that Satyam Infoway had garnered immense goodwill associated with its business, and therefore denying it the use of its domain name would render injustice to it.

The court also ruled that the right to use similar domain names could not be conferred upon both the parties in equal measure, since upon evidence adduced during the proceedings it was reasonable to conclude that Sifynet Solutions had adopted Satyam Infoway's mark with a dishonest intention to pass off its services as those of Satyam Infoway's.

== Subsequent developments ==
While the decision was appreciated for the finality it introduced in respect of the law regulating domain name disputes, it was also criticized by some in the legal circles for failing to notice the significant distinctions between trade marks and domain names. The decision has also been criticized because it is believed that the Trade Marks legislation is not equipped to deal with the myriad disputes that arise in the domain name realm. Further, it is also believed that even the Information Technology Act, 2000, has failed to fill in the lacunae in the Trade Marks Act with respect to domain names.

In 2004, The National Internet Exchange of India (NIXI), a not-for-profit company under Section 25 of Indian Companies Act 1956 promoted by the Department of Information Technology (DIT) in association with the Internet Service providers Association of India (ISPAI), was entrusted with the responsibility of setting up the Registry for .IN country code top level domain name (ccTLD). For this the NIXI will create the .IN Network Information Centre (INNIC) to operate as a Registry for .IN domain in India.

In 2005, NIXI/.IN Registry came up with .IN Domain Name Dispute Resolution Policy (INDRP), pertaining to resolution of domain name disputes between the Trademark Holders and the .IN Domain Registrants based upon the similar principles as Uniform Domain Name Dispute Resolution Policy. INDRP very clearly reads under clause 4 as: "The Registrant is required to submit to a mandatory Arbitration proceeding in the event that a Complainant files a complaint to IN Registry, in compliance with this Policy and Rules thereunder". That is, as soon as you register .IN Domain Name you become liable under INDRP for any complaint filed against the Domain Name. INDRP proceedings are conducted in accordance with IN Domain Name Dispute Policy, INDRP Rules of Procedure and Arbitration and Conciliation Act, 1996. Wherein the panelist (in UDRP) is referred to as an Arbitrator under INDRP policy.

== See also ==
- Domain name
- Uniform Domain-Name Dispute-Resolution Policy
