= Service mark =

Trademark used to identify a service rather than a product

A fictional logo using the service mark symbol

A service mark or servicemark is a trademark used in the United States and several other countries to identify a service rather than a product.

When a service mark is federally registered, the standard registration symbol ® or "Reg U.S. Pat & TM Off" may be used (the same symbol is used to mark registered trademarks). Before it is registered, it is common practice (with some legal standing) to use the service mark symbol ℠ (a superscript SM).

== Usage ==
A service mark differs from a trademark in that the mark is used on the advertising of the service rather than on the packaging or delivery of the service, since there is generally no "package" to place the mark on, which is the practice for trademarks. For example, a private carrier can paint its service mark on its vehicles, such as on planes or buses. Personal service providers can place their service marks on their delivery vehicles, such as on the trucks of plumbers or on moving vans. However, if the service deals with communications, it is possible to use a service mark consisting of a sound (a sound trademark) in the process of delivering the service. This has been done in the case of AT&T, which uses a tone sound followed by a woman speaking the company's name to identify its long-distance service; MGM, which uses the sound of a tiger's roar; and RKO Pictures, which used a Morse code signal for their motion pictures.

Under United States law, service marks have a different standard of use in order to count as a use in commerce, which is necessary to complete registration and to stop infringement by competitors. A trademark normally needs to be used on or directly in association with the sale of goods, such as on a store display. As services are not defined by a concrete product, use of a service mark on the uniforms or vehicles of service providers or in advertisements is instead accepted as a use in commerce. However, like trademarks, service marks must pass a test of distinctiveness for it to be qualified as a service mark. For example, Thrifty, Inc. attempted to submit a service mark application that described aspects of their business (uniforms, buildings, certain vehicles) as "being blue". The application was rejected for not being specific enough, and the rejection was upheld on appeal.

== See also ==
- Certification mark
- Marketing
- Service mark symbol
