= Passing off =

Common law tort

Passing off is a common law tort which can be used to enforce unregistered trade mark rights. The tort of passing off protects the goodwill of a trader from misrepresentation.

The law of passing off prevents one trader from misrepresenting goods or services as being the goods and services of another, and also prevents a trader from holding out their goods or services as having some association or connection with another when this is not true.

== Passing off and trade mark law ==
A cause of action for passing off is a form of intellectual property enforcement against the unauthorised use of the trade dress (the whole external appearance or look-and-feel of a product, including any marks or other indicia used) which is considered to be similar to that of another party's product, including any registered or unregistered trademarks. Passing off is of particular significance where an action for trade mark infringement based on a registered trade mark is unlikely to be successful (due to the differences between the registered trade mark and the unregistered mark). Passing off is a common law cause of action, whereas statutory law such as the United Kingdom Trade Marks Act 1994 provides for enforcement of registered trademarks through infringement proceedings.

Passing off and the law of registered trade marks deal with overlapping factual situations, but deal with them in different ways. Passing off does not confer monopoly rights to any names, marks, get-up or other indicia. It does not recognize them as property in its own right.

Instead, the law of passing off is designed to prevent misrepresentation in the course of trade to the public, for example, that there is some sort of association between the businesses of two traders.

One recent example of its application by the United Kingdom Intellectual Property Office can be found in a Trade Mark Opposition Decision in 2001. It was held that two brands of confectionery both named "Refreshers", one made by Swizzels Matlow and one by Trebor Bassett, which had coexisted since the 1930s, would deceive a consumer as to their source for some items but not for others. Both coexist in the marketplace.

Some jurisdictions have adopted the passing off doctrine through competition law in parallel with trade mark protection. For example, in China, according to Supreme People's Court judicial guidance writings, dual, simultaneous liability for the same facts apply under both trademark and competition law. Justices Yan and Cao wrote that, in Siemens Corporation v. Qishuai LLC (China Supreme People’s Court, 2022), "Qishuai registered a business entity for Shanghai Siemens Electronic Appliances Ltd. in Seychelles, which it argued gave a right to use the entity’s name on its products [...] using the Siemens name on the product infringed on the trademark, and using it on the trade dress and advertising is unfair competition."

== Required elements ==
When coming to court, there are three elements in the tort which must be fulfilled. In Reckitt & Colman Products Ltd v Borden Inc, Lord Oliver reduced the five guidelines laid out by Lord Diplock in Erven Warnink v. Townend & Sons Ltd. (the "Advocaat Case") to three elements:

1. Goodwill owned by a trader
2. Misrepresentation
3. Damage to goodwill

The plaintiff has the burden of proving goodwill in its goods or services, get-up of goods, brand, mark or the thing standing for itself. Goodwill normally develops alongside a brand name or brand association. It has been described as "the attractive force by that brings in custom" by Lord Macnaghten in the UK case IRC v Muller & Co.'s Margarine [1901] AC 217.

The plaintiff also has the burden of proof to show false representation (intentional or otherwise) to the public to have them believe that goods/services of the defendant are that of the Plaintiff. There must be some connection between the plaintiff's and defendant's goods, services or trade. They must show likely or actual deception or confusion by the public.

It is the court's duty to decide similarity or identity of the marks, goods or services. The criteria are often: aural, visual and conceptual similarity (often applied in trademark infringement cases).

For the element of damage to goodwill, there may be a loss or diversion of trade or dilution of goodwill. The plaintiff need not prove actual or special damage; real and tangible probability of damage is sufficient. This damage should however be reasonably foreseeable. It is not enough just to show likelihood or actual deception or confusion.

Ultimately, the court must use common sense in determining the case, based on evidence and judicial discretion, and not witnesses.

Disclaimers may not be enough to avoid passing off or cause of action.

== Extended passing off ==
One of the instances where passing off is actionable is the extended form of passing off, where a misrepresentation as to the particular quality of a product or service causes harm to another's goodwill. An example of this is Erven Warnink v Townend & Sons Ltd., in which the makers of advocaat sued a manufacturer of a drink similar but not identical to advocaat, but which was successfully marketed as advocaat.

The extended form of passing off is used by celebrities as a means of enforcing their personality rights in common law jurisdictions. Common law jurisdictions (with the exception of Jamaica) do not recognise personality rights as rights of property. Accordingly, celebrities whose images or names have been used can successfully sue if there is a representation that a product or service is being endorsed or sponsored by them or that the use of their likenesses was authorised when this is not true.

== Reverse passing off ==
Another variety, somewhat rarer is so-called "reverse passing off". This occurs where a trader markets another's product or service as being his own (see John Roberts Powers School v Tessensohn [1995] FSR 947). It is usually covered by the same court rulings as straight passing off. In the UK, reverse passing off exists where trader A claims that trader B's goods are actually trader A's. Although not expressly endorsed by the courts, reverse passing off was successfully argued by the plaintiff in Bristol Conservatories Ltd v Conservative Custom Built Ltd [1989].

== Defences ==
There are many defences that can be used by a defendant to dismiss a claim in passing off. The most common are:

1. Delay or acquiescence
2. Bona fide use of the defendant's name
3. Concurrent use

Delay in the claimants claim for passing off can be used by a defendant as a defence. Mostly, the claimants delay will be fatal to the grant of interim relief by a court. Essential for an acquiescence defence is that failure of the claimant to act should have induced the defendant to believe that the wrong was being assented to.

The second most common defence is invoked where the defendant is trading under their own name. This permits the trader to trade under his name as long as he had not been causing significant deception.

Concurrent use requires the defendant to show that he and another trader have acquired the right to use the same name. It has been used successfully whereby both the claimant and defendant trade different goods, as this would not cause confusion within the public.

== Remedies ==
There are several remedies available to a claimant. These include injunctions, damages, a requirement to account for profits earned, destruction, or a declaration that the Defendant was passing off goods as the claimants.

== See also ==
- Perry v Truefitt
- Plagiarism
- Private label
- Satyam Infoway Ltd. v. Sifynet Solutions Pvt. Ltd. – Indian case on passing off in domain names
- White-label product
