= July 1900 =

Month in 1900

<<	July 1900					>>
Su	Mo	Tu	We	Th	Fr	Sa
1	2	3	4	5	6	7
8	9	10	11	12	13	14
15	16	17	18	19	20	21
22	23	24	25	26	27	28
29	30	31

The following events occurred in July 1900:

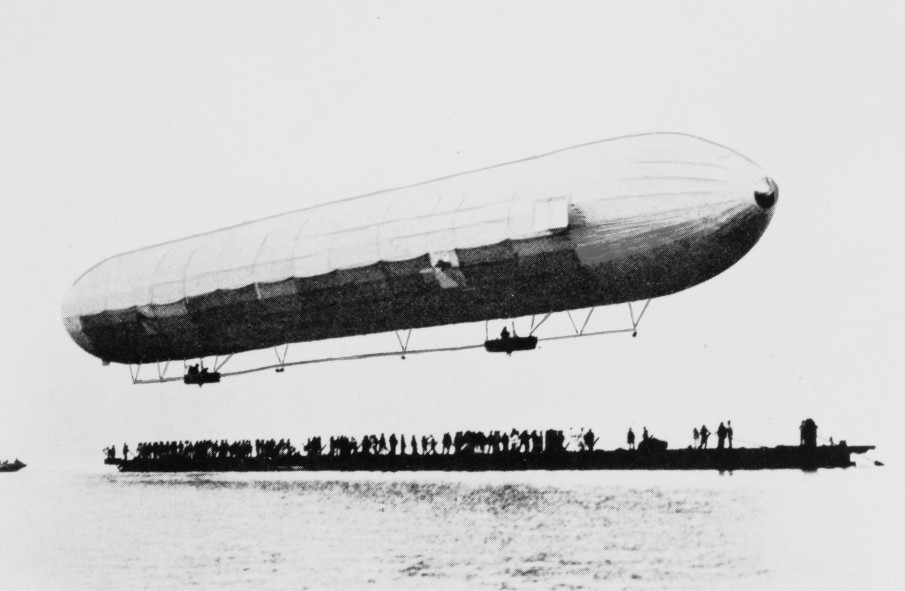
July 2, 1900: The new LZ-1 opens a new era in air travel

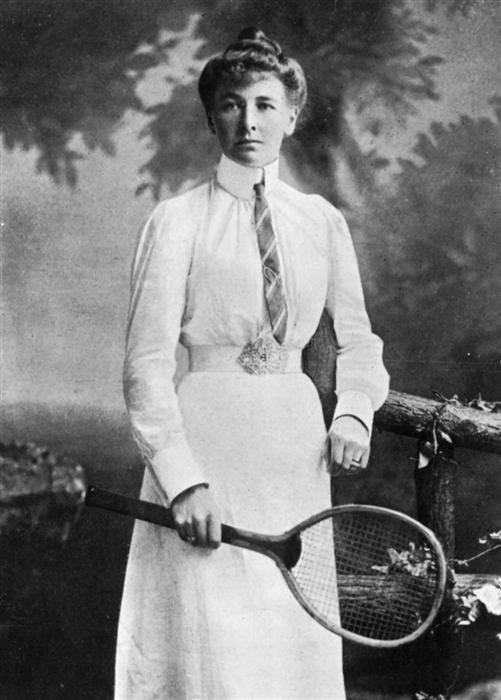
July 11, 1900: Charlotte Cooper becomes first woman ever to win an Olympic medal

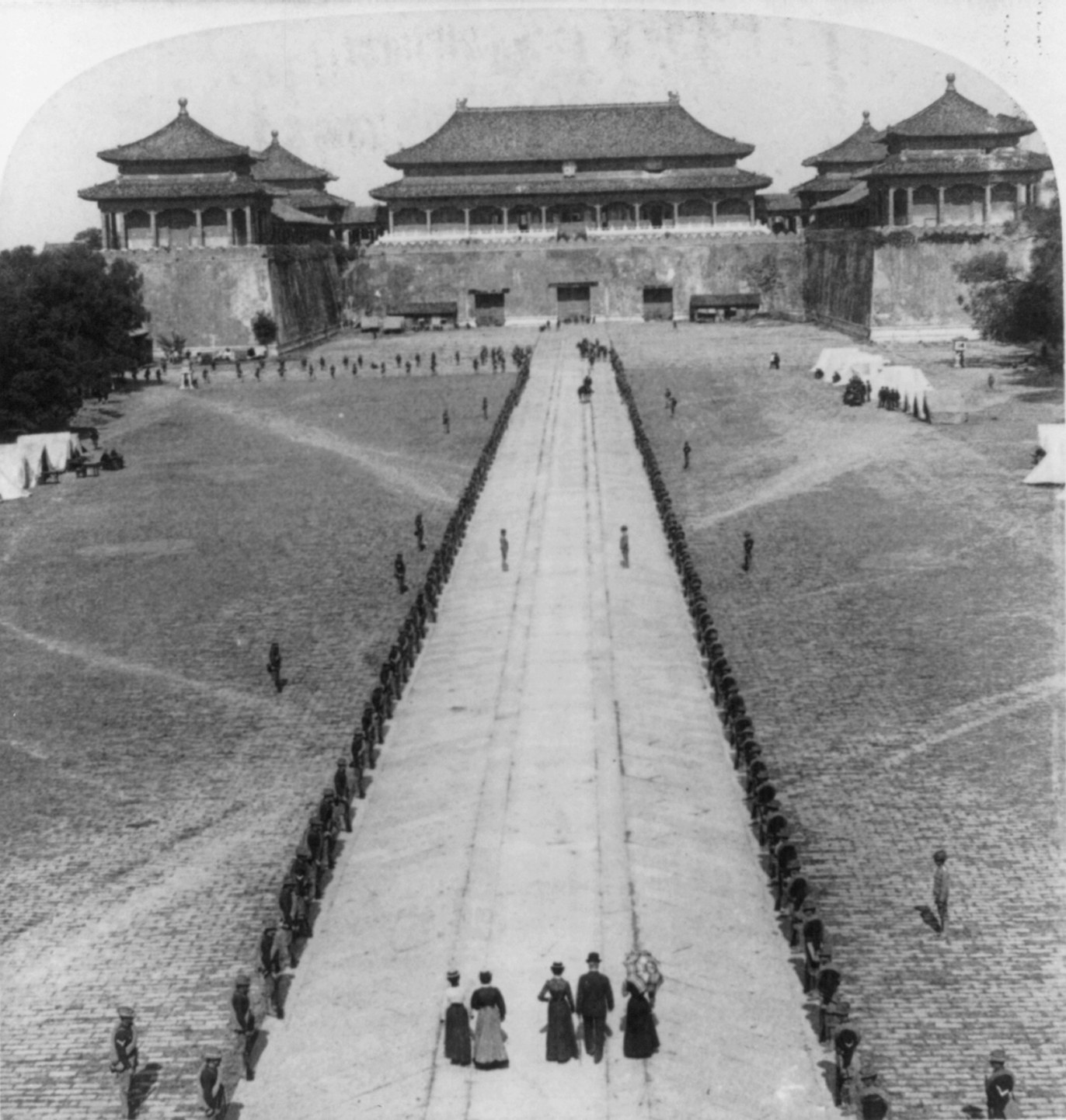
July 20, 1900: First confirmation that diplomats are still alive in Beijing

== July 1, 1900 (Sunday) ==
- In Beijing, the Chinese army temporarily drove off German and American defenders within the legation area, and left one side unprotected for more than an hour. Had an attack been made at that time, the Chinese soldiers would have been able to overrun the foreign legations.
- Archduke Franz Ferdinand, Crown Prince of Austria-Hungary, married the daughter of a Czech aristocrat, Sophie Chotek von Chotkova at Reichstadt in Bohemia (now Zákupy in the Czech Republic). The couple had four children: Princess Sophie von Hohenberg who was born the following year on July 24, 1901, while Maximilian, Duke of Hohenberg was born on September 28, 1902 and Prince Ernst von Hohenberg in 1904. There was also a stillborn son born in 1908. The couple were shot on Sunday, June 28, 1914, in Sarajevo by one of a team of Serbian nationalists.

== July 2, 1900 (Monday) ==
- From China came dispatches that proved to be wrong. According to some reports, the foreign legations in Beijing had been overrun and burned, and "the public execution of foreigners has been in progress since June 20." The New York Times published the rumors on page 7. The London Daily Mail printed a similar dispatch on July 16, 1900, and a memorial service was planned for St Paul's Cathedral, then cancelled after the veracity of the Shanghai cable was questioned. Still, as rumors continued to be received from dispatches, the consensus was that it was unlikely that the heavily outnumbered foreigners could hold out against the Chinese armies.
- Jean Sibelius's tone poem Finlandia received its première with the Helsinki Philharmonic Orchestra conducted by Robert Kajanus.
- Arab Algerians began a new uprising against the French colonial government in an attack on a French Foreign Legion patrol along the Touat River. Five Italian legion members were decapitated, and an Arab officer in the 1st Algerian Spahis was speared to death. From there, the rebels moved northward up the river.
- Starting at 8:03 pm, the first rigid airship flew from the Manzell district of Friedrichshafen, Germany, near Lake Constance. Luftschiff Zeppelin 1 (or LZ1), with Count Ferdinand von Zeppelin and four others aboard, flew at an altitude of 1,300 feet (400 m), going 3.75 miles (6.04 km) in 18 minutes before being forced to land due to a broken part.
- David Sarnoff, 9, arrived in New York after immigrating from Uzlyany in Russia, and went to work selling newspapers. After becoming an office boy at American Marconi, Sarnoff worked his way up and in 1916, would write a memo outlining his vision of making the radio as common a household item "as the piano or the phonograph". Over the next several decades, Sarnoff oversaw the spread of radio and then television across the world.
- Quarantine was declared in Nome, Alaska, due to a large measles outbreak in the Native American community. Throughout 1900 the mortality rate in some communities was 100% and estimates place the death toll between 1,000 and 2,000 people.

== July 3, 1900 (Tuesday) ==
- United States Secretary of State John Hay, following up on the Open Door Policy toward China, sent a diplomatic note to the European powers making it clear that the Allied expedition against the Boxers should be limited to release of the legations, and that no attempt should be made to divide China among the victors in the invasion. "The policy of the Government of the United States is to seek a solution which may bring about permanent safety and peace to China, preserve Chinese territorial and administrative entity, protect all rights guaranteed to friendly Powers by treaty and international law, and safeguard for the world the principle of equal and impartial trade with all parts of the Chinese Empire."
- In Beijing, a force of 23 British, 15 Russian and 15 American defenders departed the safety of the walled legation compound to go on the offensive. The multinational force destroyed a tower that the Chinese armies had been building outside the legation grounds. The Chinese army temporarily drove off German and American defenders within the legation area, and left one side unprotected for more than an hour. Had an attack been made at that time, the Chinese soldiers would have been able to overrun the foreign legations.
- In Paris, a statue of George Washington was unveiled at the Place d'Iena, as a gift of the women of the United States to the people of France.

== July 4, 1900 (Wednesday) ==
- One of the worst streetcar accidents in U.S. history killed 43 people and injured 65 in Tacoma, Washington, when a car plunged 100 feet into a ravine. The passengers were coming from Lakeview, Parkland, and other southern suburbs for Tacoma's Independence Day celebration. Shortly after 8 in the morning, the car jumped the track at 26th and C Streets. A 1910 streetcar accident in Kingsland, Indiana, would kill 41 people.
- The Standard Oil refinery in Bayonne, New Jersey, was destroyed. A lightning strike set fire to three of the 40,000-gallon tanks, which then spread to explode seven others. Windows were shattered in the Hook Village section of town, and the bay itself was set on fire. The fire, which caused $2.5 million in damage, was brought under control by July 7.
- The latest addition to William Randolph Hearst's newspaper empire, the Chicago American, published its first edition. The paper lasted 74 years, changing its name to Chicago Today, and publishing its final issue on September 13, 1974.
- During his lifetime, Louis Armstrong gave his birthdate as July 4, 1900. After the jazz musician died in 1971, however, biographer Gary Giddins located the baptismal register certificate that showed Armstrong had actually been born on August 4, 1901.
- Born: Robert Desnos, French surrealist poet, in Paris (d. 1945)
- Died: Alexander Skene, 73, Scottish gynecologist, discoverer of the Skene's gland (b. 1837)

== July 5, 1900 (Thursday) ==
- The Commonwealth of Australia Constitution Act passed the Parliament of the United Kingdom.
- In Kansas City, at the Democratic Convention, William Jennings Bryan was nominated for President, and former U.S. Vice-President Adlai E. Stevenson was selected as his running mate. The nomination, set for July 4, had been delayed over a battle on the "16 to 1" ratio of silver to gold as part of the Democratic platform. The proposition passed 26–24, with the margin coming from delegates from Arizona, New Mexico, Oklahoma and Hawaii, which were not yet states, while Alaska was against the proposition).
- Football club West Ham United was created in East London, acquiring the assets of the defunct Thames Ironworks football team.

== July 6, 1900 (Friday) ==
- The Allies were forced to retreat from Tianjin after a six-hour battle against Chinese troops. However, reinforcements arrived and the Eight-Nation Alliance would take the city on July 14.
- Warren Earp, 45, was shot and killed at the Headquarters Saloon in Willcox, Arizona. The town still holds its Western Heritage Days in acknowledgment of the event.
- Born: Frederica Sagor Maas, American screenwriter; in New York City (d. 2012). Maas would pass away at age 111, having lived in the 19th, 20th and 21st centuries.

== July 7, 1900 (Saturday) ==
- In China, Bishop Antonino Fantosati and Father Joseph Gambaro were tortured and killed as they were returning by boat from a pastoral visit in the Hunan Province. Both men were among the Martyr Saints of China who would be canonized in 2000.

== July 8, 1900 (Sunday) ==
- Elliott Frost, son of poet Robert Frost, died at age three of typhoid fever. Frost, who blamed himself for not calling his personal physician sooner, later wrote about the tragedy in the poem "Home Burial".
- Died: Henry D. Cogswell, 80, American philanthropist who championed the construction of drinking fountains across the nation as an aid to combatting the consumption of alcohol (b. 1820)

== July 9, 1900 (Monday) ==
- In China, the Taiyuan massacre took place as Governor Yu-Hsien of the Shanxi Province ordered captive foreign missionaries and their families to be executed. After being promised an escort to safety, the prisoners were brought before the Governor who ordered their beheading. Reverend George Farthing was the first to die and after all the men had been executed, Farthing's wife and three young children were killed along with the remaining foreigners. Forty-six (34 Protestant and 12 Catholic) died in one day.
- Queen Victoria signed the Act to Constitute the Commonwealth of Australia (Stat. of Victoria, 63 & 64, Chap. 12), in duplicate, keeping one copy for the United Kingdom and giving the other document to the representatives of the Australian colonies to take home with them, along with the table, the inkstand and the pen that had been used for the signing. Under the Act, the Queen would proclaim that five of the six colonies (Victoria, South Australia, New South Wales, Tasmania and Queensland) and "if Her Majesty is satisfied that the people of Western Australia have agreed thereto", a sixth would "unite in one indissoluble Federal Commonwealth under the Crown of the United Kingdom of Great Britain and Ireland." The proclamation was made on September 17, 1900 and the Commonwealth came into being on January 1, 1901, three weeks before her death.

== July 10, 1900 (Tuesday) ==
- "Nipper", the RCA Victor dog, was registered as a trademark and became one of the advertising icons of the 20th century. The dog belonged to Francis Barraud, whose painting His Master's Voice showed the animal listening to just that on a gramophone.
- Born: Mitchell Parish (pen name for Michael Hyman Pashlelinsky), Lithuanian-born American songwriter from the "Tin Pan Alley" era, best known for writing the lyrics to Hoagy Carmichael's "Stardust" and to Duke Ellington's "Sophisticated Lady" (d. 1993)

== July 11, 1900 (Wednesday) ==
- Charlotte Cooper of the United Kingdom became the first woman to ever win an Olympic medal, when she defeated Yvonne Prévost in the tennis competition at the 1900 Summer Olympics in Paris. The first revived games, at Athens in 1896, had been for men only.
- In the first and only Olympic competition for croquet, French athletes were the sole participants in all events. Gaston Aumoitte and Chrétien Waydelich won medals in the one-ball and two-ball competitions.
- The Buddhasasanangha Library was founded in Wat Benchamabophit, Siam (now Thailand). King Chulalongkorn intended to amass the largest collection of Buddhist scriptures and books up to that time.

== July 12, 1900 (Thursday) ==
- U.S. President William McKinley, vacationing at his home in Canton, Ohio, was formally notified of his re-nomination. An observer at the time noted that he made a long speech in reply, that was notable "because of the fact that he did not make a solitary reference to the Trusts."
- A German cruise ship, the SS Deutschland, broke the Blue Riband record for the first time with an average speed of 22.42 knots (41.52 km/h; 25.80 mph).
- Juan Gomez, described by the St. Augustine Record as "the oldest man in the United States", drowned while fishing in Florida, supposedly aged 122. Gomez had long claimed to be one of the crew of the pirate José Gaspar (Gasparilla), who terrorized the high seas until his death in 1821.

== July 13, 1900 (Friday) ==
- The Earl of Hopetoun, John Adrian Louis-Hope, was selected to be the first Governor-General of Australia. Hopetoun had been Governor of New South Wales from 1889 to 1895.
- Born: George Lewis (stage name for George Zenon), American jazz musician, noted clarinetist and band leader for the Preservation Hall Jazz Band; in New Orleans (d. 1968)
- Died: Emerson H. Liscum, 58, United States Army colonel, was killed in action at the Battle of Tientsin (b. 1841)

== July 14, 1900 (Saturday) ==
- In China, Tianjin was captured by the Allied forces after a three-day battle. The Allies had 775 killed or wounded, mostly from Russian troops and Japanese troops under the command of the Japanese Colonel Kuriya. Parties of German and French soldiers destroyed the enemy's guns, while American, British, Japanese and Austrian troops, and the Welsh Fussillers captured the arsenal.

== July 15, 1900 (Sunday) ==
- The village of Tchou-kia-ho (Zhujiahe) in Qin County of Hebei Province was besieged by the Boxers and by Imperial soldiers. The walled village had, since May, been a haven for 3,000 Chinese Christians, and held out for three days before being overrun, and a massacre followed. Some Catholic defenders, including Peter Zhu Rixing and Mary Zhu Wu, would later be canonized.
- On the same day, Chinese residents of the Russian city of Blagoveshchensk were slaughtered by Russian troops. By July 17, thousands of Chinese had been forced into the flood-swollen Amur River where they drowned.

== July 16, 1900 (Monday) ==
- A few months after his return from exile in Siberia, Vladimir Lenin left Russia for Munich, Germany, to begin a five-year self-imposed exile. From there, he began work on publishing the newspaper Iskra, with the first issue created on December 11, 1900.
- At the 1900 Summer Olympics nine track and field (athletics) events were held, closing out three days of competition. Ray Ewry, an American who had recovered from a crippling bout with polio, won three gold medals on the same day, in the standing high jump, the standing long jump and the standing triple jump, all events that were later discontinued. Officer John Flanagan of the New York City Police Department won the first Olympic hammer throw championship, and a combined Denmark/Sweden team beat France to win the first Olympic tug of war competition.

== July 17, 1900 (Tuesday) ==
- In Beijing, a temporary truce was called between the Chinese army and the multinational defending force within the Beijing Legation Quarter. Food was provided, and the foreign ambassadors were allowed to send telegrams back to their capitals. By month's end, the siege resumed.
- Mount Adatara erupted in Japan, killing 72 workers who had been digging for sulfur on the southwest side of the mountain.
- Christy Mathewson, Hall of Fame baseball pitcher, made his major league debut for the New York Giants in the fifth inning of a game against the Brooklyn Dodgers, losing 13–7. New York City was in the midst of a heat wave.

== July 18, 1900 (Wednesday) ==
- Symphony No. 1 in E Minor by composer Jean Sibelius was first performed as conductor Robert Kajanus introduced it in Berlin.

== July 19, 1900 (Thursday) ==
- The first line of the Métro was inaugurated in Paris. The underground subway ran an east–west route from Porte de Vincennes to Porte Maillot.
- Michel Théato won the Olympic marathon in a time of 15 seconds short of 3 hours (2:59:45). Only 8 of the 19 entrants finished the 40.26 kilometres (25.02 mi) race as the heat in Paris was over 102 °F (39 °C).

== July 20, 1900 (Friday) ==
- "For one month we have been besieged in British Legation under continued shot and shell from Chinese troops. Quick relief only can prevent general massacre. --CONGER." China's minister to the United States, Wu Ting-fang, delivered the telegraphed message to United States Secretary of State John Hay, providing the first confirmation that the foreign envoys in Beijing were still alive. The message, sent by U.S. Ambassador to China Edwin H. Conger in the U.S. State Department cipher, had been a reply to Hay's ciphered message of July 11. To rule out the possibility that the Chinese army had captured the cipher books, Secretary John Hay sent a reply the next day: "Dispatch received. Authenticity doubted. Answer this giving your sister's name." Conger's reply confirmed the news.

== July 21, 1900 (Saturday) ==
- Alberic Crescitelli was executed by Boxers in China and was later beatified as one of the Martyr Saints of China.
- Composer Arthur Sullivan made his last public appearance, attending the performance at The Crystal Palace of the song, The Absent-Minded Beggar, Rudyard Kipling's poem, which he had set to music. Sullivan died four months later.

== July 22, 1900 (Sunday) ==
- At the 1900 Summer Olympics, Walter Tewksbury of the United States won the 200-metre race for his fifth medal of the Olympic Games (2 golds, 2 silver and 1 bronze). In the first and last Olympic 5000-metre team race, a combined British and Australian team defeated a French team.

== July 23, 1900 (Monday) ==
- King Alexander of Serbia announced that he would marry his mistress, Draga Mašin, who had been one of the servants for his mother, Natalie. The Cabinet resigned, including Alexander's father, who was Commander-in-Chief of the Serbian army after abdicating in 1889. Despite protests, the marriage took place on August 5. The king and his wife would be assassinated in 1903.
- The First Pan-African Conference took place in London, a three-day international gathering focused on strategies to bring about rights for all people of African ancestry, independence from colonialism for African countries and international black unity. W. E. B. Du Bois and Henry Sylvester Williams were among the prominent names associated with the conference.
- Robert Charles, a self-educated African-American civil rights activist, shot and wounded one of three members of the New Orleans Police Department who approached him while he was sitting with his roommate in a predominantly white neighborhood. This began a series of events which would trigger the Robert Charles riots.

== July 24, 1900 (Tuesday) ==
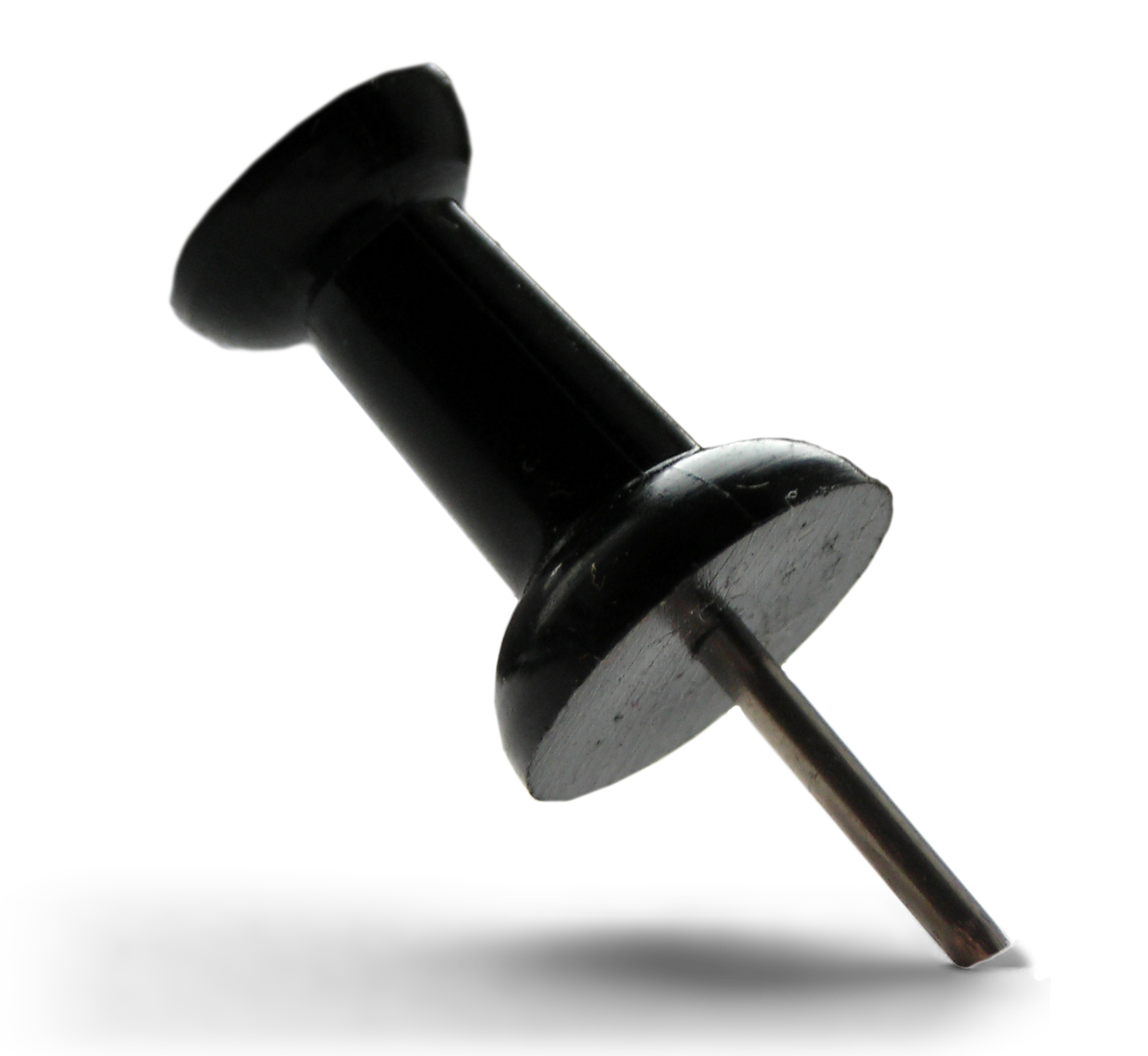
a push-pin

- Revolutionaries in China signed the document "Regulations for Peaceful Rule", written by lawyer Kai Ho, including Sun Yat-sen, as well as Yang Chu-yun and Xie Zhantai (Tse Tsan Tai), for presentation to Hong Kong Governor Henry Arthur Blake, requesting British help in reconstructing China to a parliamentary government, with an advisory body composed of foreign ambassadors.
- In the pre-dawn hours, Robert Charles shot and killed Captain John Day and Patrolman Peter J. Lamb of the New Orleans Police Department as they entered his home. Although the home was surrounded, Charles was able to escape. The incident would trigger the "Robert Charles riots".
- The patent for the first "push-pin", U.S. Patent #654,319 was granted to inventor Edwin Moore of Newark, New Jersey, who had filed his application on July 24, 1899, for an improvement on previous attempts to have a pin fastened to a wood peg. The difference for Moore's creation was that the end of the peg with the pin was wider than the end held by the user so that the "body portion can be firmly held by the operator when inserting the device" to prevent his or her fingers from slipping.

== July 25, 1900 (Wednesday) ==
- In New Orleans, violence that became known as the "Robert Charles riots" broke out as white rioters began attacking black residents at random in response to the killing of two policemen by Robert Charles the previous day. With Charles still on the loose, a mob gathered at the Robert E. Lee Monument at 7 pm and then marched up St. Charles Avenue toward the African American section of town. Two days later, Charles was located at 1208 Saratoga Avenue and killed, but not before he shot 24 people.

== July 26, 1900 (Thursday) ==
- The Office of the United States Postmaster General issued its Order No. 875, which provided that "the introduction of rural free delivery will not increase or otherwise modify the present rate of postage on second-class matter", increasing the delivery of magazines and newspapers to rural locations.

== July 27, 1900 (Friday) ==
- Kaiser Wilhelm gave the infamous "Hun Speech" at Bremerhaven, Germany as he dispatched troops to fight in China. The most inflammatory line was, "Wie vor tausend Jahren die Hunnen unter ihrem König Etzel sich einen Namen gemacht, der sie noch jetzt in Überlieferung und Märchen gewaltig erscheinen läßt, so möge der Name Deutscher in China auf 1000 Jahre durch euch in einer Weise bestätigt werden, daß es niemals wieder ein Chinese wagt, einen Deutschen scheel anzusehen!". "Just as the Huns under their King Etzel (figure of the "Nibelungenlied") made a name for themselves a thousand years ago which still, in saga and tradition, makes them appear powerful, so may the name "German" be impressed by you for a thousand years, that no Chinese will ever dare again look askance at a German!" The Germans were, for a century thereafter, referred to as "Huns".
- In the climax of the Robert Charles riots, New Orleans police officers and white vigilantes surrounded the house where Robert Charles was hiding. When police officers attempted to arrest Charles, he shot and killed Corporal John F. Lally and mortally wounded Sergeant Gabriel J. Porteous, who died of his injuries the following day. Keeper Andrew Van Kuren, the jail keeper of the City Workhouse, and other officers took up positions in a home near the one where Charles was barricaded. Charles shot and killed Van Kuren when he stood in a doorway of the home. The police decided to set the house where Charles was hiding on fire in order to drive him out; when Charles tried to escape, Charles Noiret, a medical student at Tulane University, shot and killed him. The angry mob beat and fired guns at Charles' body.

== July 28, 1900 (Saturday) ==
- In Zürich, Albert Einstein received his diploma from technical school, the Eidgenossische Technische Hochschule (ETH).
- Hsi Ching-ch'eng, formerly China's ambassador to Russia, Germany, Austria, and the Netherlands, was executed for his opposition to the Boxer faction in the Imperial Court.

== July 29, 1900 (Sunday) ==
- At Monza, King Umberto was assassinated by anarchist Gaetano Bresci, a resident of Paterson, New Jersey. The King had attended an awards ceremony at a gymnastics competition and was preparing to leave at 10pm when Bresci shot him three times. Umberto's son Victor, the Prince of Naples, succeeded him. Back in Paterson where Mrs. Bresci still lived, Mayor John Hinchliffe reassured the press that the city's 104 policemen were keeping an eye on possible terrorism. "There is one thing I want to say and that is the plot to kill King Humbert was not hatched in New Jersey", said Governor Foster McGowan Voorhees, adding, "I am sure it was made up in New York if plotted in this country at all." Legend has it that King Umberto met his exact double the day before at a restaurant, and that the man died earlier in the day "of a shooting accident".
- Born: Eyvind Johnson, Swedish writer, recipient of the Nobel Prize in Literature in 1974; in Boden (d. 1976)

== July 30, 1900 (Monday) ==
- On the same day that Queen Victoria's second son Alfred died, her eldest, Albert, Prince of Wales, presided over the inauguration of the Central London Railway, London's third underground subway.

== July 31, 1900 (Tuesday) ==
- By a margin of 44,800 to 19,691 voters in the colony of Western Australia approved the Constitution of Australia, clearing the way for their admission as a state in the Commonwealth of Australia.
- A peaceful coup d'état against Colombian President Manuel Antonio Sanclemente was mounted in Colombia by the Historical Conservatives led by Vice President José Manuel Marroquín. Sanclemente was in ill health and far away from the capital city of Bogotá, and neither the War Commissioner nor the chief of police prevented the coup from taking place.
