= September 1900 =

Month of 1900

<<	September 1900					>>
Su	Mo	Tu	We	Th	Fr	Sa
						1
2	3	4	5	6	7	8
9	10	11	12	13	14	15
16	17	18	19	20	21	22
23	24	25	26	27	28	29
30

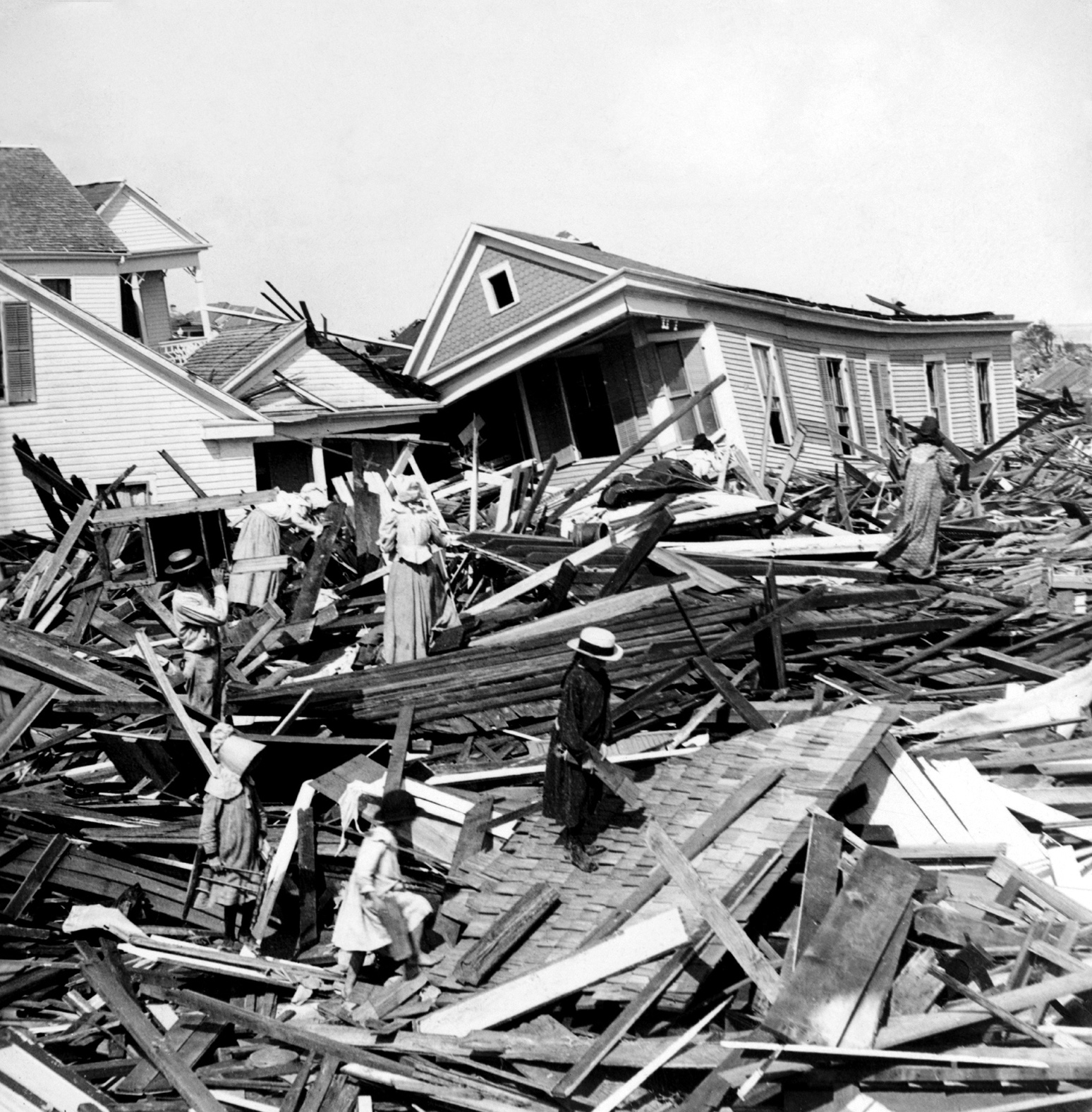
September 8, 1900: Thousands killed by hurricane in Galveston, Texas

The following events occurred in September 1900:

== September 1, 1900 (Saturday) ==
- Following its conquest by the armies of Lord Roberts, the South African Republic, also called the Transvaal, was annexed by the United Kingdom.
- The German-American Telegraph Company opened the first direct line between Germany and the United States. At 7,917 kilometers or 4,919 miles, the line was the longest transatlantic cable to that time, running from Emden to New York City, via the Azores.

== September 2, 1900 (Sunday) ==
- Santiago, Chile inaugurated its first electric streetcar service.
- Thirteen people were killed and more than 30 seriously injured at Hatfield, Pennsylvania, when a freight train plowed through two cars of a passenger train.

== September 3, 1900 (Monday) ==
- The 1899 Hague Convention came into effect, with many of the world's major powers (but not the United States) agreeing to attempt peaceful resolution of international conflicts.
- On Labor Day in Charleston, South Carolina, the "Capital City Guards", an African-American regiment of the South Carolina state guard, were giving an exhibition drill at Capital Square, when a group of white men on horseback drove into the black crowd, knocking down a woman and a child. Eight members of the guard chased after the attackers, then attached bayonets to their rifles and charged into the crowd. Although nobody was seriously injured, Governor Miles Benjamin McSweeney ordered the disbanding of the 14-year-old unit the next day, after finding that the guards had accumulated a large stock of ammunition in their armory.
- A 3200-volt power line crossed onto the St. Louis Metropolitan Police Department call box circuit. 16 police officers were electrocuted while attempting to use call boxes. Police Officer John P. Looney and Police Officer Nicholas F. Beckman died the same day; Police Officer Michael Burke would die of his injuries on December 13, 1901.
- Born: Urho Kekkonen, President of Finland from 1956 to 1982; in Pielavesi (d. 1986)

== September 4, 1900 (Tuesday) ==
- Lord Curzon, the Viceroy of India, reported that response to the Indian Famine was fully underway, and that "4,891,000 persons" had received relief.

== September 5, 1900 (Wednesday) ==
- A decree signed by the French President, Émile Loubet, officially created the Territoire militaire des pays et protectorats du Tchad as part of the growing French colonial empire. The new territory was placed under the command of a Commissioner who answered to the High Commissioner of the French Congo (called French Equatorial Africa (AEF) after 1910), of which Chad was a circumscription.
- Died: Arthur Sewall, 64, American industrialist and politician, Democratic nominee for Vice President of the United States as the running mate of William Jennings Bryan in the 1896 presidential election (b. 1835)

== September 6, 1900 (Thursday) ==
- Filipino leader Emilio Aguinaldo set up his headquarters at Palanan, on the eastern side of the island of Luzon in the Philippines. There, he would guide the fight against the American armies until his capture in 1901.
- Born: W. A. C. Bennett, Canadian politician, Premier of British Columbia from 1952 to 1972; in Hastings, New Brunswick (d. 1979)

== September 7, 1900 (Friday) ==
- As an alternative to suspending constitutional rights, Emperor Franz Joseph of Austria-Hungary ordered the dissolution of the Abgeordnetenhaus, the elected body of the Reichsrat, Austria's parliament. The legislators were divided along ethnic lines between German and Slavic parties. Following elections in December, the Reichsrath was reconstituted under premier Ernest von Koerber. The Diet of Hungary was not affected by the order.
- Born: Taylor Caldwell (pen name for Janet Miriam Caldwell), British-born American writer, author of Dynasty of Death and Captains and the Kings; in Manchester (d. 1985)

== September 8, 1900 (Saturday) ==
- A powerful hurricane hit Galveston, Texas, killing at least 6,000 of the island's 38,000 residents. The storm reached Galveston Island, off the Gulf Coast of Texas, at 2:00 a.m. By noon, the waters were over the bridges to the mainland and flood waters rolled in after 3:00 pm. The anemometer measured the windspeed at 84 miles per hour (135 km/h) before blowing away at 6:15 p.m. At 7:32, the water level suddenly rose 4 feet (1.2 m) as waves rolled in, and within 30 minutes, the water was 8 feet (2.4 m) deep.

== September 9, 1900 (Sunday) ==
- The Galveston hurricane ended after the entire island had been under 8 feet (2.4 m) of water. "Without apparent reason", reporter Richard Spillane would write later, "the waters suddenly began to subside at 1:45 a.m. Within twenty minutes they had gone down two feet, and before daylight the streets were practically freed of the flood waters." When the survivors ventured out, the full extent of the storm was realized, with thousands of corpses across the island. By month's end, at least 2,311 bodies had been recovered.
- Born: James Hilton, English writer, author of Lost Horizon and Goodbye, Mr. Chips; in Leigh, Lancashire (d. 1954)

== September 10, 1900 (Monday) ==
- A local militia company, the "Galveston Sharpshooters", began patrolling Galveston, Texas the day after the hurricane had passed on, and began dealing with looters. "On Monday, some men caught looting deserted houses and robbing dead bodies were promptly shot on the spot", it was noted fifty years later, "how many were never learned exactly." One estimate was that there were as many as 250 looters killed, some found "with pockets full of fingers ... sliced off in their haste to procure the rings on them."

== September 11, 1900 (Tuesday) ==
- French President Émile Loubet, selected as an arbitrator of the boundary between Colombia and Costa Rica, rendered his decision, declaring that a mountain range at roughly 9 degrees north would be the border; that islands east of Burica Point would belong to Colombia, and that the Burica Islands and all to the west would be Costa Rican. After Panama seceded from Colombia, the 1900 boundary became the frontier between Panama and Costa Rica, as outlined in Title I, Article 3 of the Panamanian Constitution of 1904.
- Nixey Callahan, pitcher for the Chicago Cubs (at that time, the Chicago Orphans), set a record by giving up 48 hits in back-to-back games, allowing 23 hits in a 14–3 loss to the New York Giants. In his previous start, he had given up 25.

== September 12, 1900 (Wednesday) ==
- With the authority to act as a legislature for the Philippines, the five-member Taft Commission enacted its first laws. The first four acts, passed on the same day, appropriated money for road construction, surveys, and the salaries for two new government employees. The work of the five commissioners — William Howard Taft, Henry Idle, Luke Wright, Dean Worcester, and Bernard Moses – is now the responsibility of the 24 Senators and 250 Representatives of the Congress of the Philippines.
- Admiral Fredrik von Otter became Prime Minister of Sweden, succeeding Erik Gustaf Boström, who resigned "for reasons of health". Boström retook the state leadership from von Otter in 1902.

== September 13, 1900 (Thursday) ==
- Filipino resistance fighters under the command of Colonel Maxio Abad defeated a large American column in the Battle of Pulang Lupa, and captured Captain James Shields.
- Dr. Jesse Lazear allowed himself to be bitten by a mosquito at the Las Animas Hospital in Cuba, as he searched for a cure for yellow fever. Five days later, he began to feel ill, and he died on September 25. Dr. Lazear's tragic experiment proved that the disease was spread by mosquitoes, and that the prevention of yellow fever required the eradication of the insects.
- Wilbur Wright visited Kitty Hawk, North Carolina, for the first time, on the shantyboat Curlicue.
- Born: Honoria Aughney, Irish activist, promoter of Irish republicanism and Irish nationalism; in Tullow, County Carlow (d. 1991)

== September 14, 1900 (Friday) ==
- A proclamation by the recently annexed Transvaal proclaimed Schalk Willem Burger to be acting president of the South African Republic. President Paul Kruger, who had fled the country, was given a six-month "leave of absence to visit Europe".
- Leading a force of 22 men, Sergeant Henry F. Schroeder of the 16th U.S. Infantry defeated a force of 400 Filipino insurgents at Carig, now part of Santiago City. Sgt. Schroeder killed 36 and wounded 90, and was awarded the Medal of Honor for distinguished gallantry.

== September 15, 1900 (Saturday) ==
- Rikken Seiyūkai, or "Friends of Constitutional Government", was founded as Japan's newest political party, with former Prime Minister Itō Hirobumi as its leader. The Seiyukai party won a majority in the elections in October, bringing Ito back into power.

== September 16, 1900 (Sunday) ==
- Prince Albert of Saxony, son of the King George, was killed in an accident after a collision with a carriage driven by Prince Miguel of Braganza.
- A battle at Similoan, Philippines involved 90 American troops confronting 1,000 Filipinos. Resulting casualties included 24 Americans killed, 5 missing, 9 wounded.

== September 17, 1900 (Monday) ==
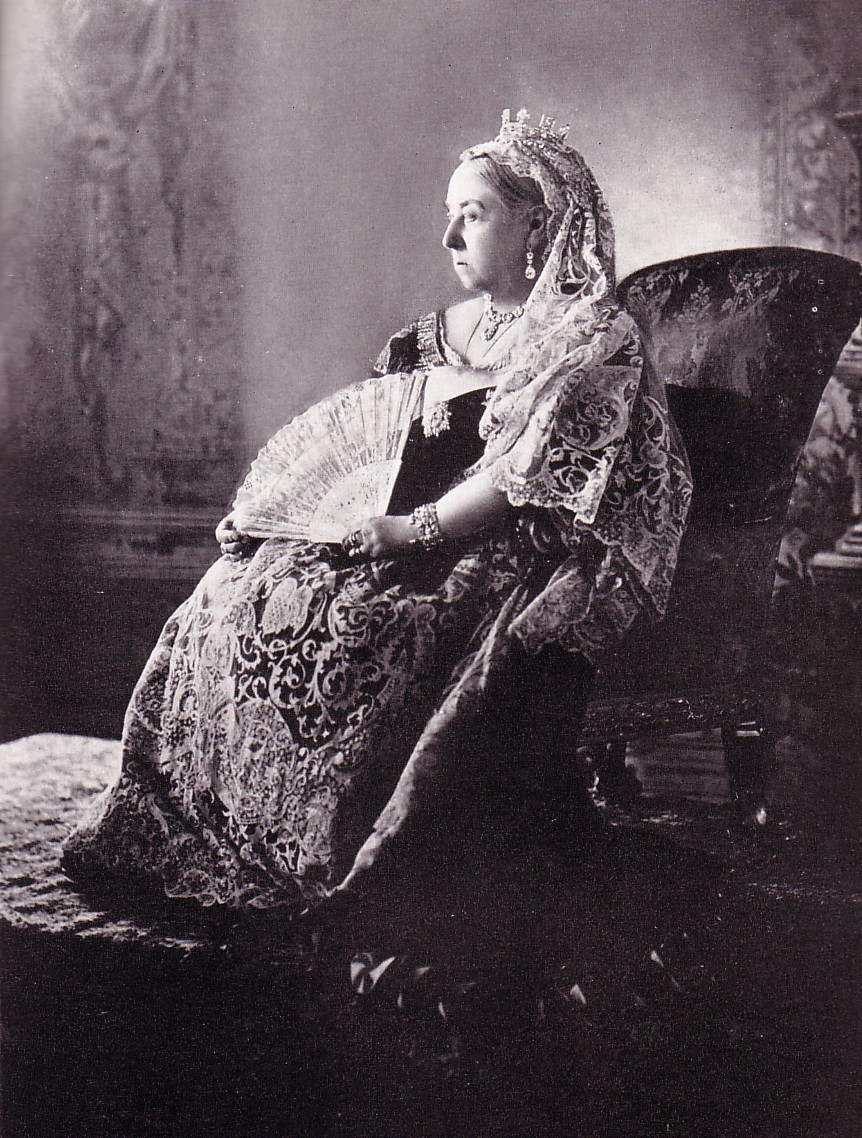
Queen Victoria

- Queen Victoria issued the Proclamation of the Commonwealth of Australia, stating "We do hereby declare that on and after the first day of January One thousand nine hundred and one the people of New South Wales, Victoria, South Australia, Queensland, Tasmania and Western Australia shall be united in a Federal Commonwealth under the name of The Commonwealth of Australia."
- Queen Victoria declared the Parliament of the United Kingdom dissolved, with new elections to take place during October.
- The largest walkout in American history, up to that time, began as 112,000 anthracite coal miners left their workplaces in the mines of Pennsylvania. The strike ended on October 17.
- Filipinos under the command of General Juan Cailles defeated Americans from the 15th and 37th Infantries, under the command of Captain David Mitchell, at the Battle of Mabitac.
- The Chicago Public Schools began teaching blind children for the first time, using special teachers trained for the task.
- During Cincinnati's baseball game at Philadelphia, Reds' third base coach Tommy Corcoran uncovered a telegraph wire that the Phillies had been using in order to steal signals from visiting teams.

== September 18, 1900 (Tuesday) ==
- The first primary election in the United States took place, as an 1899 Minnesota law was given its first trial. There were 254 candidates seeking their political party's nomination for various positions in the city of Minneapolis. In the race to be the nominee in the November general election for Mayors of Minneapolis, Mayor James Gray was the Democrat's pick, while former Mayor A. A. Ames was the Republican choice.
- The American League completed its last season as a minor baseball circuit, with the Chicago White Stockings (led by Charles Comiskey) finishing in first place with a record 82 wins and 52 losses, ahead of Connie Mack's 78-59 Milwaukee Brewers (who would later become the St. Louis Browns, and are today the Baltimore Orioles). Teams that would continue into the modern day American League would be the White Sox, the Orioles, the Detroit Tigers, the Cleveland Lake Shores (later the Cleveland Guardians), the Kansas City Blues (later the Washington Senators, now the Minnesota Twins). Three other AL teams would be dropped (the Indianapolis Hoosiers, the Buffalo Bisons and the Minneapolis Millers) and replaced by the Philadelphia Athletics (now Oakland Athletics), the Boston Americans (now Boston Red Sox), and the Baltimore Orioles (later the New York Yankees).
- Li Hongzhang was accepted by the Allied powers as the representative of China for peace negotiations following the Boxer Rebellion, and arrived at Tianjin to begin work.
- The Egyptian steamship Charkieh was wrecked in Karystos Bay in Greece while sailing from Alexandria to Piraeus, killing 39 of the 100 people aboard.
- Born:
  - Seewoosagur Ramgoolam, Mauritian state leader, founder of the nation of Mauritius and the nation's first prime minister (1968 to 1982) and later the Governor-General (1983 to 1985); in Belle Rive (now Kewal Nagur), British Mauritius (d. 1985)
  - Walther Wenck, German World War II general; in Lutherstadt Wittenberg, Province of Saxony, Kingdom of Prussia, German Empire (d. 1982 in traffic collision)

== September 19, 1900 (Wednesday) ==
- Butch Cassidy's Wild Bunch robbed the First National Bank of Winnemucca, Nevada, taking $32,640 with $31,000 of it in $20 gold pieces.
- Died: Belle Archer, 41, American stage actress, died of a stroke caused by a cerebral thrombosis (b. 1859)

== September 20, 1900 (Thursday) ==
- The "honeycomb radiator", so named because the radiator tubes had hexagonal ends and stacked together, was patented for cooling of the engines of the Mercedes automobiles.

== September 21, 1900 (Friday) ==
- The coal miners' strike had its first casualties, as the sheriff of Schuylkill County, Pennsylvania, and his posse fired into a mob of strikers at Shenandoah. A man and a little girl were killed and six people were wounded, and units of the Pennsylvania National Guard were sent out to stop the violence.
- Died: Lewis Sayre, 80, pioneering orthopedic surgeon who invented the process of using plaster casts to treat spinal injuries (b. 1820)

== September 22, 1900 (Saturday) ==
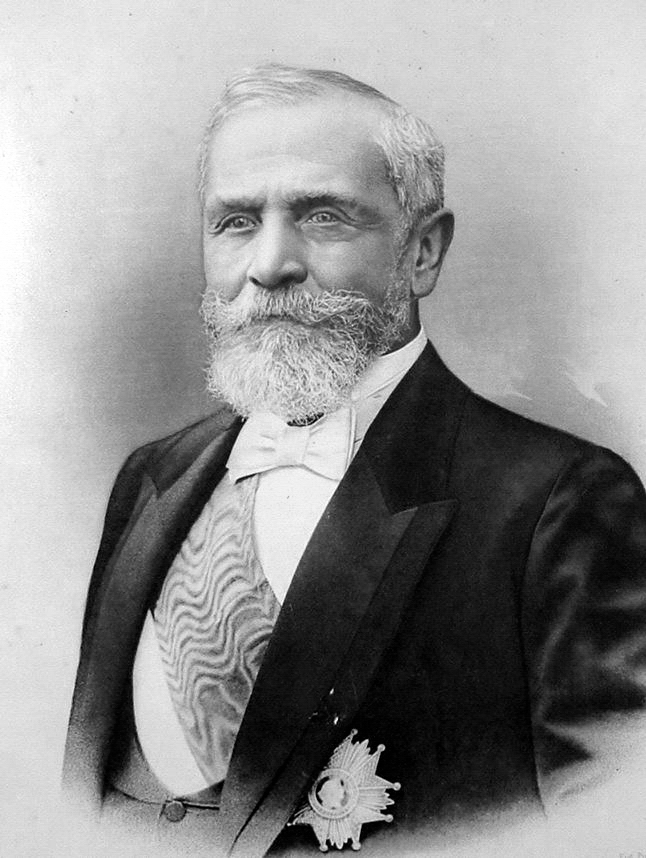
French President Émile Loubet

- At the largest banquet in history, held at the Tuileries Palace gardens, French President Émile Loubet treated the 22,695 mayors of all French cities to an evening of fine dining.
- Born: Sergey Ozhegov, Russian lexicographer; in Kuvshinovo (d. 1964)

== September 23, 1900 (Sunday) ==
- William Marsh Rice, multimillionaire and benefactor of Rice University, was found dead at his New York City apartment. Although it appeared at the time that he had died in his sleep at the age of 84, Mr. Rice's lawyer, Albert T. Patrick, tried to cash $250,000 worth of checks the next day. Eventually, it was established that Rice's valet had administered chloroform to Rice at Patrick's direction. Patrick was convicted of the murder in 1901. As he sat on death row at New York's Sing Sing prison, Patrick's sentence was commuted to life in 1906, and he was pardoned in 1912.
- One of Spain's greatest generals, Arsenio Martínez Campos, died at Zarauz, Spain. The New York Times eulogized, "Many have said that if the Spanish Government had retained Gen. Campos as Captain General of Cuba ... the Maine would not have been blown up and Spain would not stand to-day stripped of her ancient colonies."

== September 24, 1900 (Monday) ==
- A tornado swept through Morristown, Minnesota, dropping a barn upon Gatseke's Saloon, where 16 people had taken refuge. Eight were crushed in the collapse of the saloon, including a candidate for the state legislature.
- Born: Mecha Ortiz, Argentine film actress; in Buenos Aires (d. 1987)

== September 25, 1900 (Tuesday) ==
- The Parliament of the United Kingdom was formally dissolved, with nationwide elections to be held on October 1.
- Born: Fritz Kolbe, German diplomatic courier who spied for the Allies during World War II; in Berlin (d. 1971)

== September 26, 1900 (Wednesday) ==
- The Russian battleship Potemkin, scene of a history-making mutiny in 1905, and subject of a classic film by Sergei Eisenstein, was launched from the Nikolayev shipyard.
- Japan's Prime Minister Yamagata Aritomo resigned after the formation of the new Seiyukai Party. He would be replaced by Itō Hirobumi on October 19.
- The French occultist "Papus" (Gérard Encausse) demonstrated the Archeometer, invented by Alexandre Saint-Yves d'Alveydre, at the International Spiritist and Spiritualist Conference.
- The tunnel through the Cascade Range in Oregon was completed after three years and five million dollars.

== September 27, 1900 (Thursday) ==
- The Republic Theatre opened at 209 West 42nd Street in New York City, with the production of Sag Harbor, starring Lionel Barrymore. Later renamed the Victory Theater, the playhouse is now the New Victory Theater.
- Died: A. B. Frank, 61, German botanist and mycologist (b. 1839)

== September 28, 1900 (Friday) ==
- The United States Department of War received a cable from General Arthur MacArthur Jr. with the worst news to that time from the war in the Philippines. Fifty-one men from Company F of the 29th Volunteer Infantry, under the command of Captain Devereaux Shields, had apparently been taken prisoner by the Filipino resistance, along with the gunboat Villalobos. "There is scarcely a doubt that the entire party has been captured with many killed and wounded", MacArthur cabled, "Shields among the latter." The prisoners were later released on October 15, with Captain Shields and 48 men having survived.
- Charles E. Bedell, the main steelwork engineer of the new Williamsburg Bridge in New York City, fell 85 feet (26 m) from the Brooklyn end of the bridge while trying to avoid a derrick boom that was swinging toward him. He died about an hour later at the Eastern District Hospital after an ambulance surgeon from St. Catharine's Hospital refused to transport him by ambulance without a $5 payment.

== September 29, 1900 (Saturday) ==
- Rudolf Steiner began work on his book about anthroposophy, Mysticism at the Dawn of the Modern Age, selecting "the first Michaelmas Day of the new age of light", following the end of the 5,000-year-long dark age of Kali Yuga.
- In London, Parliament approved the annexation to New Zealand of Rarotonga, Mangaia, Aitutaki, Mitiaro, and Atiu in the Cook Islands group, Rakakanga and Manihiki in the Penrhyn Island group, and Savage, Palmerston and Pukapuka islands.
- Mexico's first penitentiary and correctional facility was opened at San Lazaro, northeast of Mexico City, as the most modern detention facility in the nation up to that time, and with a goal of rehabilitation of the inmates.
- Born: Miguel Alemán Valdés, President of Mexico from 1946 to 1952; in Sayula de Alemán, Veracruz (d. 1983)

== September 30, 1900 (Sunday) ==
- At Obuasi in what is now the African nation of Ghana, the last great battle of the Ashanti War took place, with a spear-wielding force of hundreds of Ashanti tribesmen fighting against the bayonets and machine guns of Britain's Colonel James Willcocks. At the end of the day, hundreds of Ashanti warriors had been killed.
- The new Associated Press, incorporated in New York City, began filing its first reports, as the old Associated Press Company of Illinois ceased its existence.
