= Dentsville =

Dentsville may refer to:

- Dentsville, Maryland
- Dentsville, South Carolina

== See also ==
- Dentville, Mississippi
