= August 1900 =

Month in 1900

<<	August 1900					>>
Su	Mo	Tu	We	Th	Fr	Sa
			1	2	3	4
5	6	7	8	9	10	11
12	13	14	15	16	17	18
19	20	21	22	23	24	25
26	27	28	29	30	31

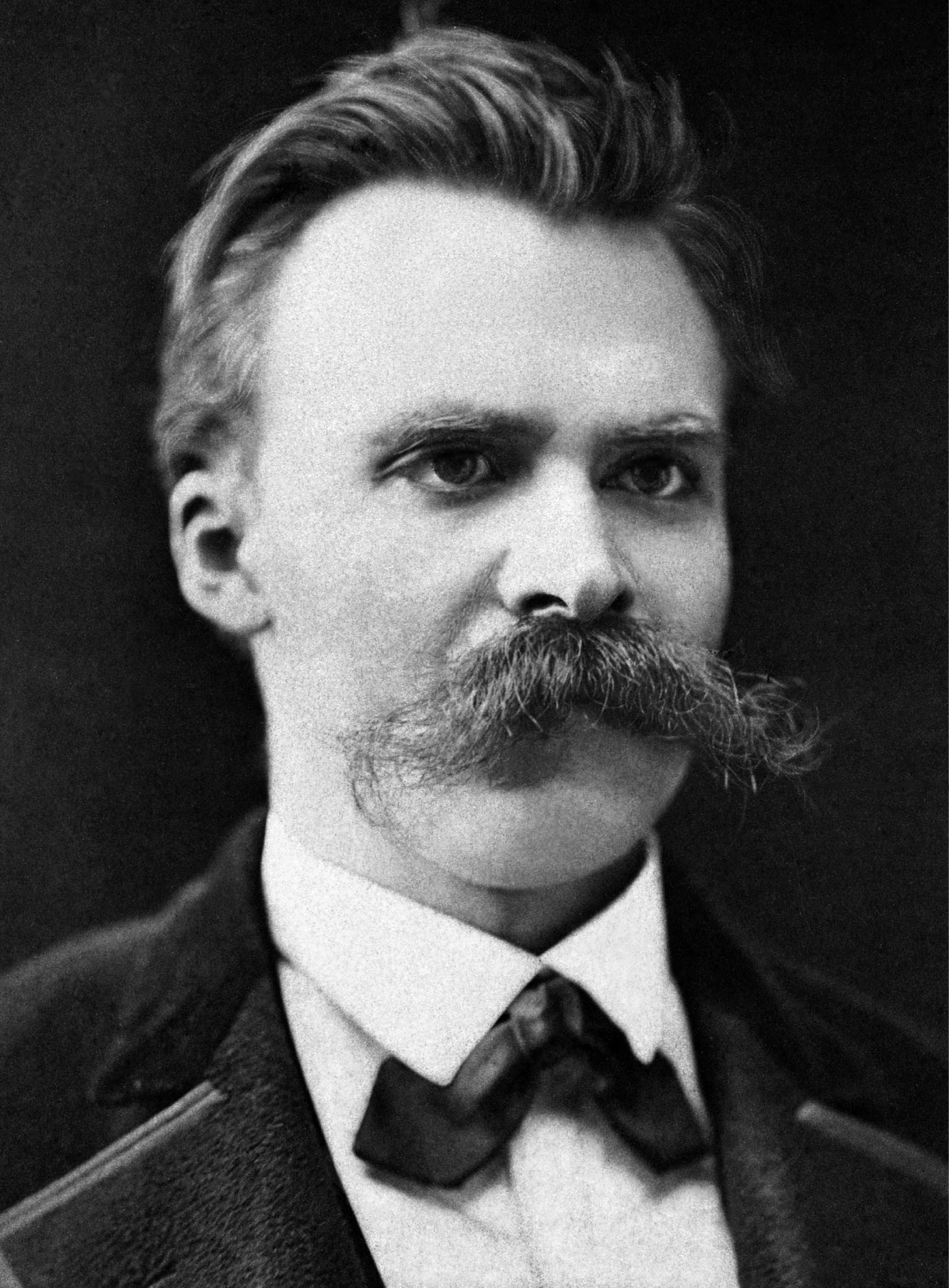
August 25, 1900: Friedrich Nietzsche dies at age 55

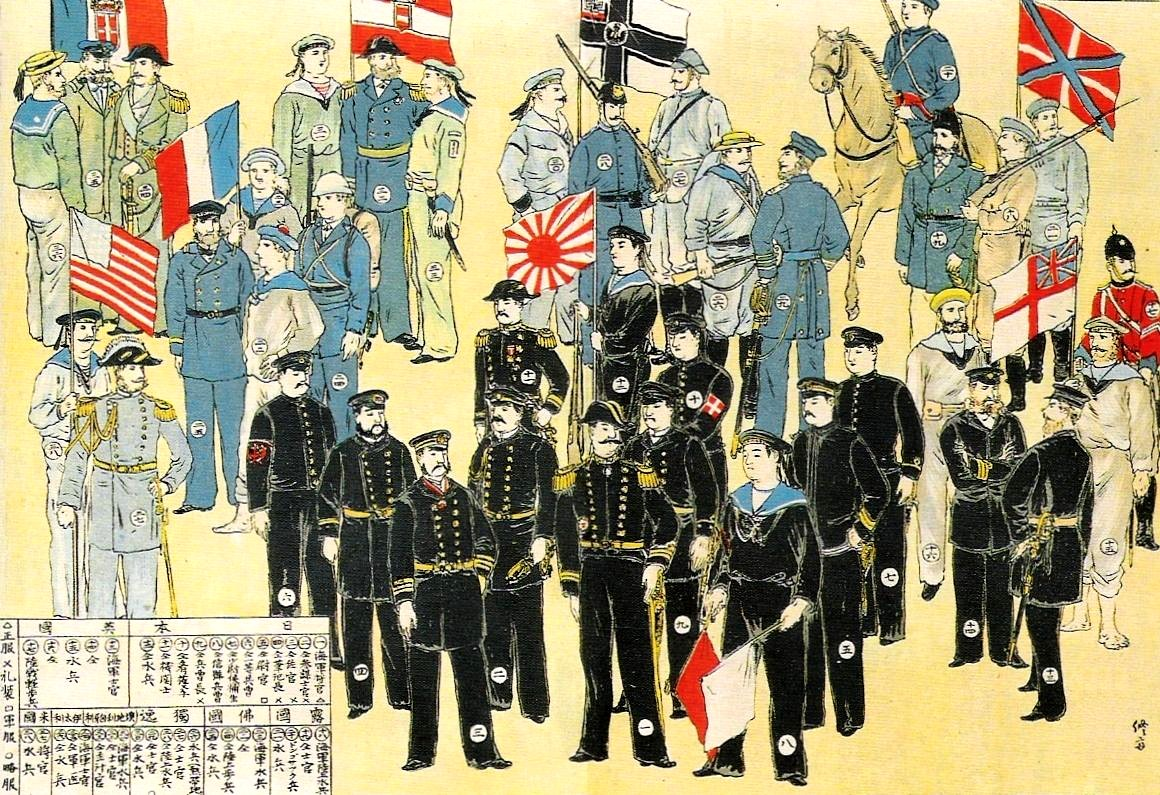
August 4, 1900: Troops of the Eight Nation Alliance march toward Beijing

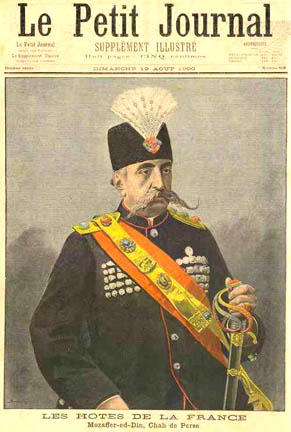
August 2, 1900: Shah of Persia saved from assassination by his prime minister

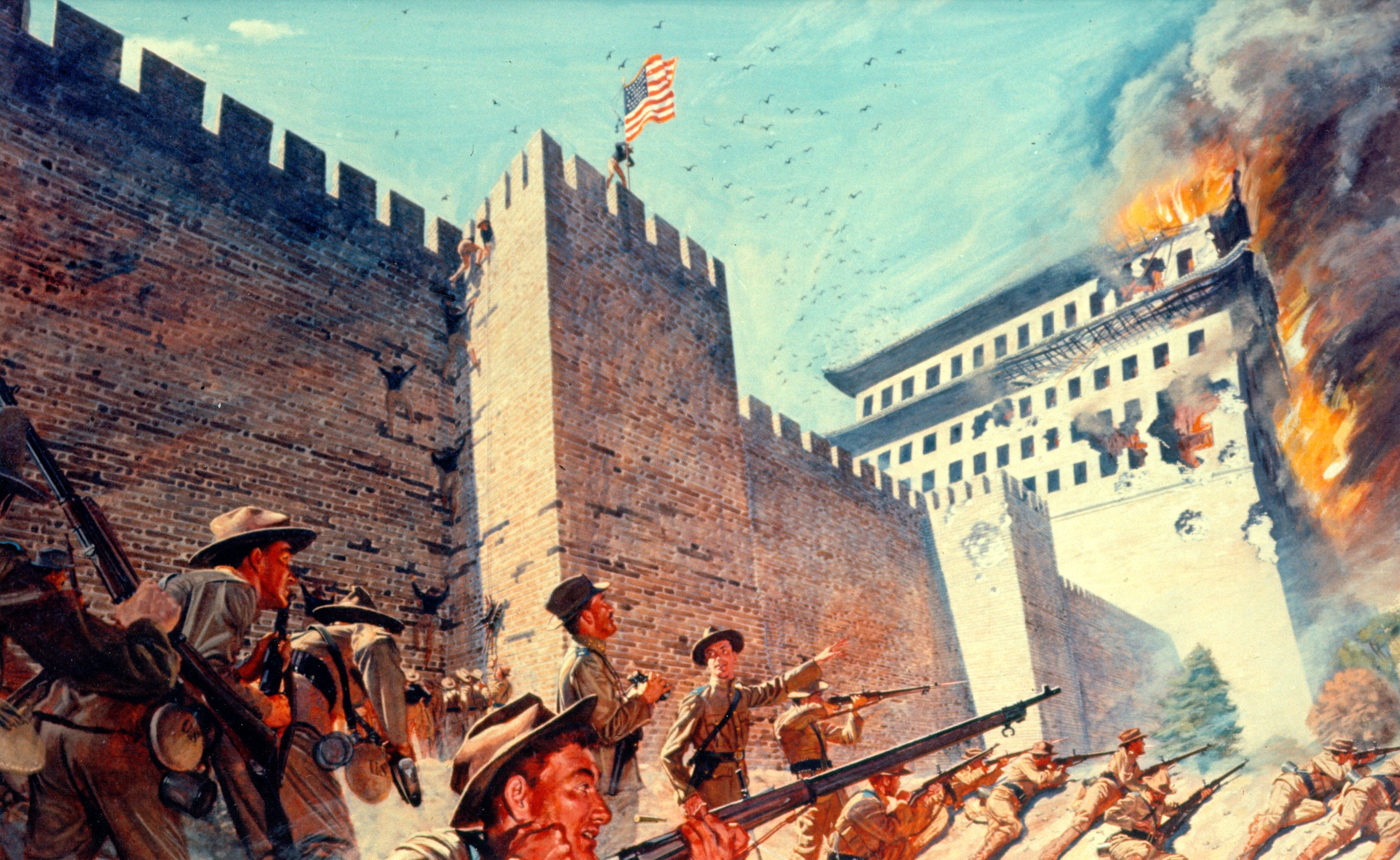
August 14, 1900: Corporal Titus begins the rescue of diplomats trapped in Beijing

The following events occurred in August 1900:

== August 1, 1900 (Wednesday) ==
- Hugh Marshall Hole, colonial administrator of Matabeleland and Bulawayo in Rhodesia (now Zimbabwe), solved the problem of a shortage of coins and bills by issuing his own money, now known by collectors as "Marshall Hole Currency".
- The Wonderful Wizard of Oz by L. Frank Baum, was published for national distribution.
- Race rioting broke out in the predominantly African-American town of Keystone, West Virginia after a white policeman shot a black arrest subject who lunged at him with a knife. An angry crowd threatened to lynch policeman Harry Messer who was then taken into the custody of the McDowell County sheriff.
- National University, the first private nonsectarian university in the Philippines and the first to instruct students in English in addition to Spanish, was founded in Manila as the Colegio Filipino. It would be renamed Colegio Mercantil and then National Academy before attaining its present name.

== August 2, 1900 (Thursday) ==
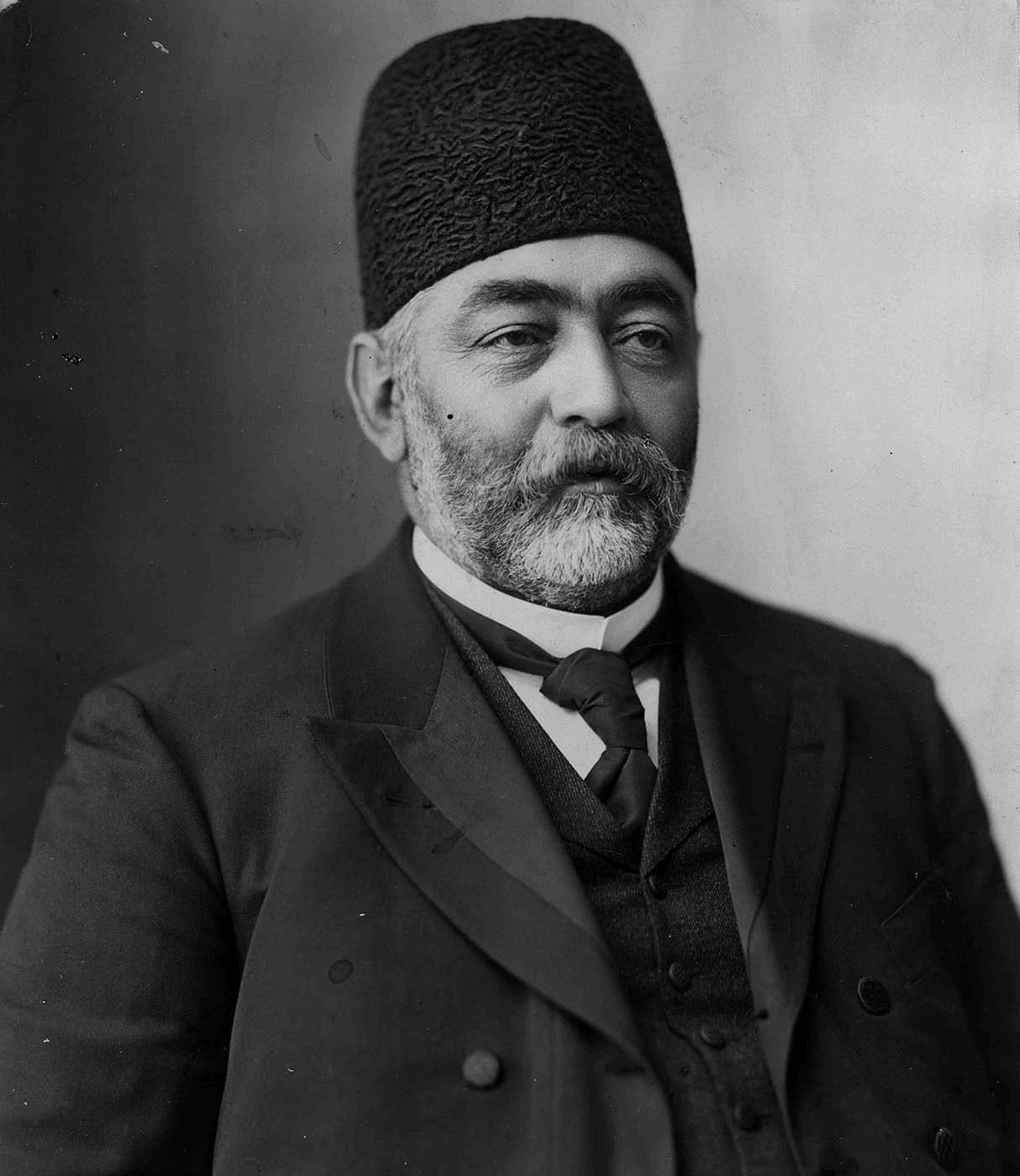
Persia's Vizier Ali Asghar Khan

- Mozaffar ad-Din Shah Qajar, the Shah of Persia (now Iran), survived an assassination attempt while visiting Paris. The Shah hit the assailant on the head with a cane and his Grand Vizier, Ali Asghar Khan twisted the assassin's wrist and forced the dropping of a pistol. The gunman, identified as Francois Salson, said that he had also tried to assassinate former French President Jean Casimir-Perier but that the gun had misfired.
- By a margin of 187,217 to 128,285, voters in North Carolina approved an amendment to Article VI of the state constitution, worded specifically to disenfranchise African-American voters. Under section 4, all persons registering to vote were required to pass a literacy test, "But no male person who was on January 1, 1867, or at any time prior thereto, entitled to vote and no lineal descendant of any such person, shall be denied the right to register and vote by reason of his failure to possess the educational qualifications herein proscribed"

== August 3, 1900 (Friday) ==
- Harvey S. Firestone established the Firestone Tire and Rubber Company as an automobile tire supply store in Akron, Ohio. Three years later, he began manufacturing tires.
- Three days of shooting events during the Olympics were staged in Paris, including live pigeon-shooting. Some were retrospectively recognized as Olympic events. Almost 300 pigeons were killed, the format being that the birds were released in front of the shooter and the prize went to whoever shot down as many pigeons as possible before missing two. The event would later be described as "the one and only time in Olympic history when animals were deliberately killed in the name of sport." Léon de Lunden of Belgium won the gold medal by killing 21 birds in flight.
- Born: Ernie Pyle, American journalist, war correspondent who received the Pulitzer Prize for covering the American infantry experience during World War II; near Dana, Indiana (d. 1945)

== August 4, 1900 (Saturday) ==
- In China, a force of 20,000 soldiers of the Eight-Nation Alliance began their march from Tianjin to Beijing to relieve the besieged envoys in the Chinese capital. The group was composed of 9,000 Japanese, 4,800 Russians, 2,900 Britons, 2,500 Americans, 1,200 French and a few hundred Austrian, German and Italian troops. At the same time, Chinese imperial troops were on their way from Beijing to resist the Allied troops.
- Born:
  - Nabi Tajima, Japanese supercentenarian and the last remaining survivor of the 19th century in Kikai, Kagoshima. She became the oldest person on Earth from September 15, 2017 when the last survivor of the 1800s, Violet Brown of Jamaica, died. Tajima would die on April 21, 2018, aged 117.
  - Elizabeth Bowes-Lyon, Queen Consort during the reign of her husband King George VI and mother of Queen Elizabeth II (d. 2002)

== August 5, 1900 (Sunday) ==
- In a seven-hour-long battle at Peit-sang, Chinese imperial troops fought against the advancing allied troops. The Allies had an estimated 1,200 killed and wounded, while the Chinese lost 4,000 killed and wounded.
- Died: James Augustine Healy, 70, the first African-American Catholic Church bishop, and Bishop of Portland (Maine) since his appointment in 1875 by Pope Pius IX. Healy's father was a white Irish immigrant and plantation owner, while his mother had been an African-American slave of mixed race and he was born in Macon, Georgia. Under the laws of that state, he was regarded as a "Negro". (b. 1830)

== August 6, 1900 (Monday) ==
- Gustav Mahler completed his Symphony No. 4.
- Born: Cecil Howard Green, English-born American entrepreneur, co-founder of Texas Instruments; in Bury, Lancashire, England (d. 2003)

== Tuesday, August 7, 1900 ==
- The Allies captured Yang-tsun after losing 700 men.

== August 8, 1900 (Wednesday) ==
- The Allied troops routed Chinese defenders at Tsi-nin, clearing the way for the liberation of foreign envoys at Beijing.

== August 9, 1900 (Thursday) ==
- From Constantinople came word of the massacre of 200 men, women and children in the village of Saganik (also called Spagbank) in the Sassun District of Anatolia. Two weeks later, the Ottoman Sultan ordered a committee to investigate the reports.
- In Boston, the first Davis Cup competition was won by the United States, as Dwight F. Davis (who donated the cup) and Holcombe Ward defeated the British team of Ernest Black and Herbert Roper Barrett in straight sets, winning the third of five scheduled matches.

== August 10, 1900 (Friday) ==
- A plot to kidnap Lord Roberts was foiled as the ringleaders were arrested in Pretoria. Hans Cordua was the only one of the perpetrators to be executed, dying before a firing squad on August 24.
- Milton S. Hershey got out of the business of making caramel candy, selling his Lancaster Caramel Company to investor Daniel F. Lafean for one million dollars in cash. Hershey and his attorney, John Snyder, turned down initial offers for a merger, then for $500,000 and finally for $900,000 cash and $100,000 stock before sealing the deal in Providence, Rhode Island, at 11:00 in the morning. With the infusion of capital, The Hershey Company built a factory in Derry Church, Pennsylvania, and created the largest chocolate manufacturer in the United States, with sales of five billion dollars a year by 2007.
- Born: Arthur Porritt, Governor-General of New Zealand 1967–1972; in Wanganui (d. 1994). Porritt had been a bronze medalist in the 1924 Summer Olympics, finishing in third place in the 100 metre dash.
- Died: Charles Russell, Baron Russell of Killowen, Lord Chief Justice of England, 67, died of complications from surgery the previous day for an internal gastric disorder.

== August 11, 1900 (Saturday) ==
- Violence broke out on Laysan in the Territory of Hawaii, after the 41 Japanese miners on the small (1.5 by 1 mile) island confronted the four white American managers of Pacific Guano & Fertilizer Company. In response, manager Joseph Spencer pulled two pistols and announced that the first person to step forward would die. When the group charged en masse, Spencer fired away, killing two of the Japanese and wounding three others. The next day, the 39 survivors were arrested and imprisoned on the ship Ceylon, and on August 16, everyone sailed back to Honolulu. Spencer was acquitted after a ten-day trial, and the other men were fired.
- Born: Philip Phillips, American archaeologist; in Buffalo, New York (d. 1994)

== August 12, 1900 (Sunday) ==
- The Allies captured Tung-chau, placing them within 13 miles (21 km) of Beijing.
- The French destroyer Framee sank after a collision with the battleship Brennus, during maneuvers off the coast of Portugal, at Cape St. Vincent. The accident occurred when the Framee turned to the right as the French fleet was ordered to turn left. Forty-six of the 60 men on the Framee died, including Captain du Plessix.
- Wilhelm Steinitz, who reigned as the world's chess champion for 20 years until losing in 1894 to Emanuel Lasker, died, penniless and insane, at the Manhattan State Hospital in New York City.

== August 13, 1900 (Monday) ==
- As troops from the Eight-Nation Alliance neared Beijing, the Chinese army set up a Krupp cannon to fire down on the foreign legations, in the heaviest attack to that time. A counterattack by guns within the embassy compound killed the Chinese gun crew and halted the attack. The allied force was within 14 miles (23 km), in Tungchow (Tongzhou).
- Thomas C. Lawler, who verified the identity of the corpse of John Wilkes Booth, died in Lynn, Massachusetts. Lawler, a barber at the National Hotel in Washington, D.C., had given Booth a haircut the day before the assassination of Abraham Lincoln.

== Tuesday, August 14, 1900 ==
- The 20,000-member multinational force arrived at Beijing for the Battle of Peking. The Russian forces attacked the Tung Pien gate. The 9th and 14th American infantries reached the 30-foot (9.1 m) high Tartar Wall where command asked for a volunteer to scale the structure. Corporal Calvin Pearl Titus, a 20-year-old bugler from Company E, climbed footholds on the wall, found it undefended, and the rest of the force followed, planting the flag at 11:03 a.m. With Japanese and American attackers drawing the Chinese army away from the walled city, a group of Sikh soldiers from the British force were the first to enter Beijing, at 2:45 pm. By 4:00, the 55-day siege of the foreign legations was over, and the next phase was to take the Imperial City and the Forbidden City.
- The Hamburg America Line cruise ship Deutschland broke the record for the fastest transatlantic crossing, arriving in Plymouth, England, at 8:20 a.m., five days, 11 hours and 45 minutes after passing the Sandy Hook Lighthouse, the point where New York City departures were considered to be underway.
- The world's first six-masted ship, the George W. Wells, was launched from Camden, Maine. At 342 feet (104 m) in length and 48 feet (15 m) wide, the Wells was the largest wooden ship in the world at that time.
- Died: Collis Potter Huntington, 78, American industrialist, built the Central Pacific, the Southern Pacific and the Chesapeake and Ohio railroads (b. 1821)

== August 15, 1900 (Wednesday) ==
- China's Empress Dowager Cixi fled from Beijing as the troops of the Eight-Nation Alliance raised the siege of the foreign legations. Prior to her departure, she ordered that Zhen Fei, the favorite wife of her predecessor, the Guangxu Emperor, be thrown down into a well.
- Rioting broke out in New York City on Eighth Avenue, between 30th and 42nd Streets, following the August 12 stabbing death of Robert Thorpe of the New York City Police Department. When a black man caused an altercation outside the home where Thorpe's body lay, fighting broke out and mobs of white men were soon pulling black people off streetcars and beating them. By 10:30, the violence seemed under control, and then a revolver was fired from inside a house on 41st Street. "This seemed a signal for the riot to begin again," noted The New York Times, "for crowds began to appear as if by magic."

== August 16, 1900 (Thursday) ==
- At an excavation at the Tel Amran ibn Ali, near the Babylonian temple at Etemenanki (near modern Al Hillah, Iraq), German excavators unearthed a glazed amphora with 10,000 coins dating from the 7th century BC.

== August 17, 1900 (Friday) ==
- The Allied troops entered the "Forbidden City", the section of Beijing that housed the Imperial quarters and was off limits even to most Chinese citizens. The Empress Dowager Cixi had fled the city to the Shensi province, 600 miles (970 km) to the south.
- Lieutenant General Gribsky, military governor of the Amur province, had published the annexation of Manchurian territory to Russia, by decree of August 12. "All the region of Manchuria occupied by our troops is henceforth withdrawn from the jurisdiction of the Chinese authorities and subordinated entirely to our authority and laws," the proclamation began, adding that the Tranz-Zeya territory and the Aigun and Sakhalin settlements would be Russian territory.
- José Maria de Eça de Queirós, one of Portugal's greatest authors, died of tuberculosis in Paris at age 54.
- A massive grasshopper infestation in Kalamazoo, Michigan closed businesses and stopped trains.

== August 18, 1900 (Saturday) ==
- At the International Congress of Mathematicians in Paris, David Hilbert presented a list of ten mathematical problems that remained unsolved and would present a challenge to mathematicians in the coming century. The list was later expanded to 23.
- Yi Haeung was elevated posthumously to King of Korea.
- Bolivian troops crushed a secession attempt in the "Republic of Acre". Bolivian ambassador Fernando e Guachalla confirmed rumors of a succession on November 29, with revolution starting in December 1899 under "a Spaniard named Galvez" (journalist Luis Gálvez Rodríguez de Arias) who returned to Madrid after three or four months, and was replaced by Rodriguez Arles of Brazil, which formally crushed the rebellion.
- Born:
  - Vijaya Lakshmi Pandit, Indian diplomat, first female president of the United Nations General Assembly (1953–1954), Governor of Maharashtra state 1962–1964; in Allahabad, North West Provinces (now Uttar Pradesh), British India (d. 1990)
  - Glenn Albert Black, American archaeologist; in Indianapolis (d. 1964)

== August 19, 1900 (Sunday) ==
- Prempeh, the King of the Asante of the Gold Coast (now Ghana), had been exiled by the British to Sierra Leone in 1897. After concluding that he was still directing his subjects from exile, the British moved the Asantehene several thousand miles away, to the Seychelles, where he remained until 1924.
- Boxer Abe Attell fought his first professional bout.
- Born: Gilbert Ryle, British philosopher, in Brighton, East Sussex (d. 1976)

== August 20, 1900 (Monday) ==
- General John C. Bates, representing the United States, signed a treaty with the Sultan Jamalul Kiram of the Jolo provinces of Mindanao.
- Empress Dowager Cixi issued a decree blaming herself for the abortive Boxer Rebellion.

== Tuesday, August 21, 1900 ==
- The Austral Islands were annexed by the Governor of Tahiti.
- Rebel leader Arcadio Maxílom proclaimed amnesty on Cebu in the Philippines.
- The United States and Spain signed a treaty to restore relations ended by the Spanish–American War.

== August 22, 1900 (Wednesday) ==
- A parachute accident in Delphos, Ohio, killed stuntman Harry Davis. Davis had jumped from a balloon as part of the attractions of the fair.

== August 23, 1900 (Thursday) ==
- The Union Jack was hoisted over Choiseul Island, an 1,147-square-mile (2,970 km^{2}) island in the Solomon Islands, and a British protectorate was declared. Shortland Island had been claimed the day before.
- The National Negro Business League (NNBL), organized by Booker T. Washington and J.H. Lewis, was founded in Boston in a meeting of 300 businessmen. Known since 1966 as the National Business League, it continues to operate in Atlanta.
- The sarcophagus of Emperor Conrad of the Holy Roman Empire was opened and his body photographed, confirming that he was long-bearded and exceptionally tall — 6 feet 6 inches (1.98 m).

== August 24, 1900 (Friday) ==
- Transvaal Army Lieutenant Hans Cordua was executed by firing squad, three days after having been found guilty of a conspiracy to kidnap the British commander, Lord Roberts.

== August 25, 1900 (Saturday) ==
- The word "television" appeared for the first time, as part of a paper presented at the International Electrical Congress in Paris. Constantin Perskyi of France delivered the paper "Télévision au moyen de l'électricité". The term was first used in the American press in 1907.
- The Chicago Coliseum, a state of the art arena with seats for 10,000 people, was dedicated in conjunction with the opening of the convention of the Grand Army of the Republic. U.S. President William McKinley had been scheduled to address the assembled veterans, but cancelled because of crises in Asia. The Coliseum, which hosted conventions, rock concerts and sports, closed in 1971 and was demolished in 1982. The same day, millions of white butterflies fluttered into downtown Chicago. The New York Times headline the next day was "Chicago Pretty at Last".
- Philosopher Friedrich Nietzsche, 55, died in Weimar, Germany, eleven years after going insane. The "Father of Modern Atheism" was buried at a graveyard at his family church.
- Born: Hans Adolf Krebs, German-born British physician and biochemist, 1953 recipient of the Nobel Prize in Physiology or Medicine; in Hildesheim (d. 1981)

== August 26, 1900 (Sunday) ==
- The "unidentified French coxswain" became the youngest Olympic medalist in history, helping the team of François Brandt and Roelof Klein win the first gold medal ever for the Netherlands. After the original coxswain, Hermanus Brockmann, proved to be so heavy that he was slowing the pair down, the Dutchmen located a boy who could serve as the third person on the team. The identity of the young man, estimated to be 10 years old, has remained a mystery, but a photograph of him was published by Brandt in a 1926 book.
- Born: Hellmuth Walter, German engineer; in Wedel (d. 1980)

== August 27, 1900 (Monday) ==
- In the Battle of Dalmanutha, British troops under the command of Lord Roberts defeated the South African troops led by General Louis Botha, forcing South African Republic President Paul Kruger to flee the country.
- A group of thunderstorms passed over Cape Verde and then began the process of coalescence and a westward drift along the trade winds. By September 5, the storms had become a hurricane in the Gulf of Mexico, and on September 8, struck Galveston, Texas, for the worst natural disaster in American history.

== Tuesday, August 28, 1900 ==
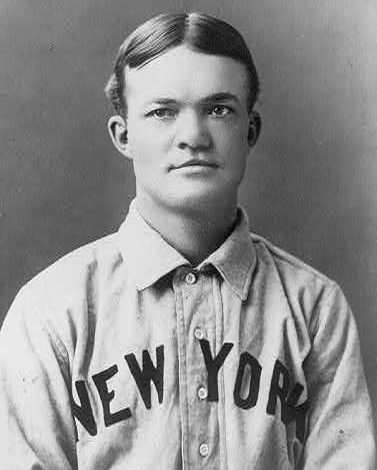
Taylor

- Luther "Dummy" Taylor became the first deaf (and the first mute) Major League Baseball player when he pitched a game for the New York Giants in a 5–4 win over the Boston Beaneaters.
- Celebrating their victory in the Boxer Rebellion, the armies of the Eight-Nation Alliance staged a parade at Beijing's Tiananmen Square.

== August 29, 1900 (Wednesday) ==
- Robert Leroy Parker (a.k.a. Butch Cassidy), Harry Longabaugh (a.k.a. the Sundance Kid) and other members of "The Wild Bunch" staged their third train robbery, taking control of Union Pacific train No. 3 at Tipton, Wyoming, robbing the express car of $45,000 and successfully escaping.
- Gaetano Bresci, who had assassinated Italy's King Umberto a month earlier, was convicted of murder and sentenced to life imprisonment after a one-day-long trial. Bresci was found dead in his cell on May 22, 1901, an apparent suicide.

== August 30, 1900 (Thursday) ==
- Former world heavyweight boxing champion "Gentleman Jim" Corbett had his final prizefight, knocking out Kid McCoy in the fifth round of a bout at Madison Square Garden. McCoy admitted later that he had been paid $5,000 to throw the fight, although Corbett said later that he had been paid to throw the fight as well.
- Harness racing legend Dan Patch, the fastest horse of his time, made his debut in a race at the Benton County Fair in Indiana.

== August 31, 1900 (Friday) ==
- The Government of Mexico called an end to an eight-month-long war against the Yaqui Indians, after exterminating most of the rebels.
