= Khedivial Mail S.S. Company =

Shipping Company

- House flag of Khedivial Mail Steamship Company
- Native name: البوستة الخديوية
- Type: Subsidiary
- Industry: Maritime transport Passenger shipping Cargo shipping Ship repair
- Predecessor: Medjidieh (Egyptian Steam Navigation Company)
- Founded: April 30, 1898
- Founder: Allen, Alderson and Company; Frank Reddaway
- Defunct: 1961
- Fate: Nationalized by the Egyptian government; merged into the United Arab Maritime Company
- Successor: United Arab Maritime Company (later Egyptian Navigation Company)
- Headquarters: Alexandria, Egypt,
- Area served: Mediterranean Sea; Red Sea; Middle East; Europe; North America
- Key people: Francis Allen; George Beeton Alderson
- Services: Mail transport Passenger transportation Cargo shipping Ship repair
- Owner: Egyptian government (1898–1919); Peninsular and Oriental Steam Navigation Company (1919–1936); Egyptian investors (1936–1961)
- Parent: Peninsular and Oriental Steam Navigation Company (1919–1936)
- Divisions: Khedivial Mail Line; Alexandria Graving Dock operations

Khedivial Mail S.S. Company was a British steamship company, established in 1898, that ran shipping services from Alexandria, Egypt and Suez, as well as shiprepair facilities, in succession to earlier ventures by the Egyptian authorities.

== Origins ==
The company was a successor to the Medjidieh, a steamship company that operated in the Red Sea and the Mediterranean, created by Said Pasha. The Medjidieh was also referred to as the Egyptian Steam Navigation Company, and quickly failed under the leadership of Said Pasha. His successor, Isma'il Pasha, restarted the venture in May 1863 in the hopes of creating a merchant marine for the modernising Egyptian nation. After falling into debt, Ismail used the company as leverage to try to gain control of and merge with the Egyptian Commercial and Trading Company, a European trading firm based in Egypt, in order to become a player in European financial markets. That venture was unsuccessful, and the merger never materialised. In 1894, the Egyptian government ordered the Medjidieh to make a large reduction in expenditure, which they achieved by eliminating some of the destination ports and closing local agencies.

== Formation ==
In January 1898, the Egyptian Government agreed to sell the fleet of the "Poste Khedivieh Administration", as well as certain ship repair facilities at Suez and Alexandria, to the British merchants Allen, Alderson and Company of Alexandria and Frank Reddaway of Manchester. Francis Allen (1852-1926) and George Beeton Alderson (1844-1926) had been in partnership together in Alexandria since around 1864 as importers of Machinery, and Builders and Contractors. They converted their firm into a limited liability company in 1900. Allen, Alderson and Co. and Frank Reddaway then arranged for these properties to be sold into a new British company: the "Khedivial Mail Steamship and Graving Dock Company Limited". This company was registered on 30 April 1898 with a capital of £300,000. Among its initial eight subscribers were Robert William Perks, and Thomas James Barratt (chairman and managing director of Pears Soaps.

That company`s fleet consisted of three ships built in 1891–1892 in Scotland and operating on the Alexandria-Piraeus-Constantinople route, as well as eight old ships serving Syrian ports and the Suez-Red Sea services. The new company raised capital to finance the purchase, further fleet renewal and the construction of a new drydock at Alexandria. They received an operating subsidy from the Egyptian Government and undertook to continue the existing mail services, with an exclusive concession for commercial passenger traffic on those routes.

=== Former Egyptian government fleet ===
Ship	O.N.	Launched	Builder	Tonnage (GRT)	Disposal and notes
El Kahira	110140	1892	Robert Napier & Sons, Govan	2027	Passenger-cargo. Sold 1920. Last seen 9 July 1922 12 nautical miles (22 km; 14 mi) west of Les Casquets, heading for Algiers.
Tewfik Rabbani	110139	1891	Robert Napier & Sons, Govan	2027	Passenger-cargo. Sold 1900 to France, renamed La Marsa. 1923 renamed Miliana, 1931 broken up.
Prince Abbas	110138	1891	Robert Napier & Sons, Govan	2027	Passenger-cargo. Sold 1916. Torpedoed 9 July 1917 29 nautical miles (54 km; 33 mi) east of Fair Island.
Dakahlieh	52728	1865	Money Wigram, Blackwall	1438	Passenger-cargo. 1923 broken up
El Rahmanieh	52697	1865	Richardson Duck and Co, Stockton-on-Tees	1688	Cargo
Charkieh	52687	1864	Thames Iron Works, Blackwall	1615	Passenger-cargo. Wrecked 18 September 1900 off Karystos, Greece in a gale
Fayoum	110137	1864	Samuda Brothers, Cubitt Town	1642	Passenger-cargo. 1909 broken up
Mahallah	50495	1864	Matthew Pearse and Co, Stockton-on-Tees	1105	Cargo. 1910 broken up
Chibine	50170	1864	J Ash & Co., London	677	Cargo. Ex-Octavia. Wrecked 9 March 1900 on the Sherateeb Shoal in the Gulf of Suez, 30 nautical miles (56 km; 35 mi) north-west of El Tor
Missir	51063	1864	Barclay Curle, Glasgow	626	Cargo. Ex-Argyll. 29 May 1918 torpedoed 80 nautical miles (150 km; 92 mi) west of Alexandria.
Neghileh	51065	1864	Barclay Curle, Glasgow	677	Cargo. Ex-Moray. Sold 1919, broken up 1923.

== Operations 1898–1919 ==
In the first year of operations the company began a programme of upgrading and expanding the fleet as well as restoring services to the full previous range of ports. In addition, due to restrictions under Ottoman law, all the ships were registered under the British flag. In early 1900, within a three days, two of the company's older steamers were lost. The cargo ship Menoufieh was wrecked on 11 March on the Sudan coast, south of Suakin; two days earlier, the passenger steamer Chibine was wrecked in the Gulf of Suez, on a voyage from Jeddah to Suez, carrying over 350 Muslim pilgrims, some Europeans, and the mails. In a subsequent inquiry, the ship was judged to have been unseaworthy, but there was no provision to enforce the Board of Trade's maritime safety regulations applicable to British-registered passenger ships as the company's vessels did not call at British ports. The same year, on 18 September Charkieh was wrecked in Greece, with a loss of 49 lives, which prompted writer and activist Wilfrid Scawen Blunt to take the matter up in The Times.

Also in 1900, construction began on the new graving dock at Alexandria in August. The total cost of this dock (the "Gabbary dry dock, 522 feet long, 75 feet average width, and 33 feet deep") was £116,400. In 1903 this graving dock was sold by the company to the Egyptian Government.

The company was purchased by the Peninsular and Oriental Steam Navigation Company in 1919 as part of P&O's post-war expansion. It continued to operate and expand, later adopting shipping routes that would bring its ships to the United States.

The company once again changed its name, to the Pharaonic Mail Line, in 1936. It was finally nationalized by the Egyptian government in 1961, forming the United Arab Maritime Company, later the Egyptian Navigation Company.
