= Dentville, Mississippi =

- Unincorporated community
- Location within Mississippi Location within the United States
- Coordinates: 31°57′36″N 90°33′19″W
- Country: United States
- State: Mississippi
- County: Copiah
- Elevation: 262 ft (80 m)
- Time zone: UTC-6 (Central (CST))
  - Summer (DST): UTC-5 (CDT)
- Area codes: 601 & 769
- GNIS feature ID: 669234

Dentville, also known as Pine Bluff, is an unincorporated community in Copiah County, Mississippi, United States.

== History ==
The community was originally known as Pine Bluff, a descriptive name for a bluff over Bayou Pierre. A post office already existed with the name Pine Bluff in Mississippi, so the community was named Dentville in honor of Warren Dent, a storeowner and the community's first postmaster.

A post office operated under the name Dentville from 1887 to 1906.

== Notable person ==
- Robert Charles, murderer and activist. Sparked the Robert Charles riots in New Orleans.
