= Egyptian ship Charkieh =

Egyptian merchant ship

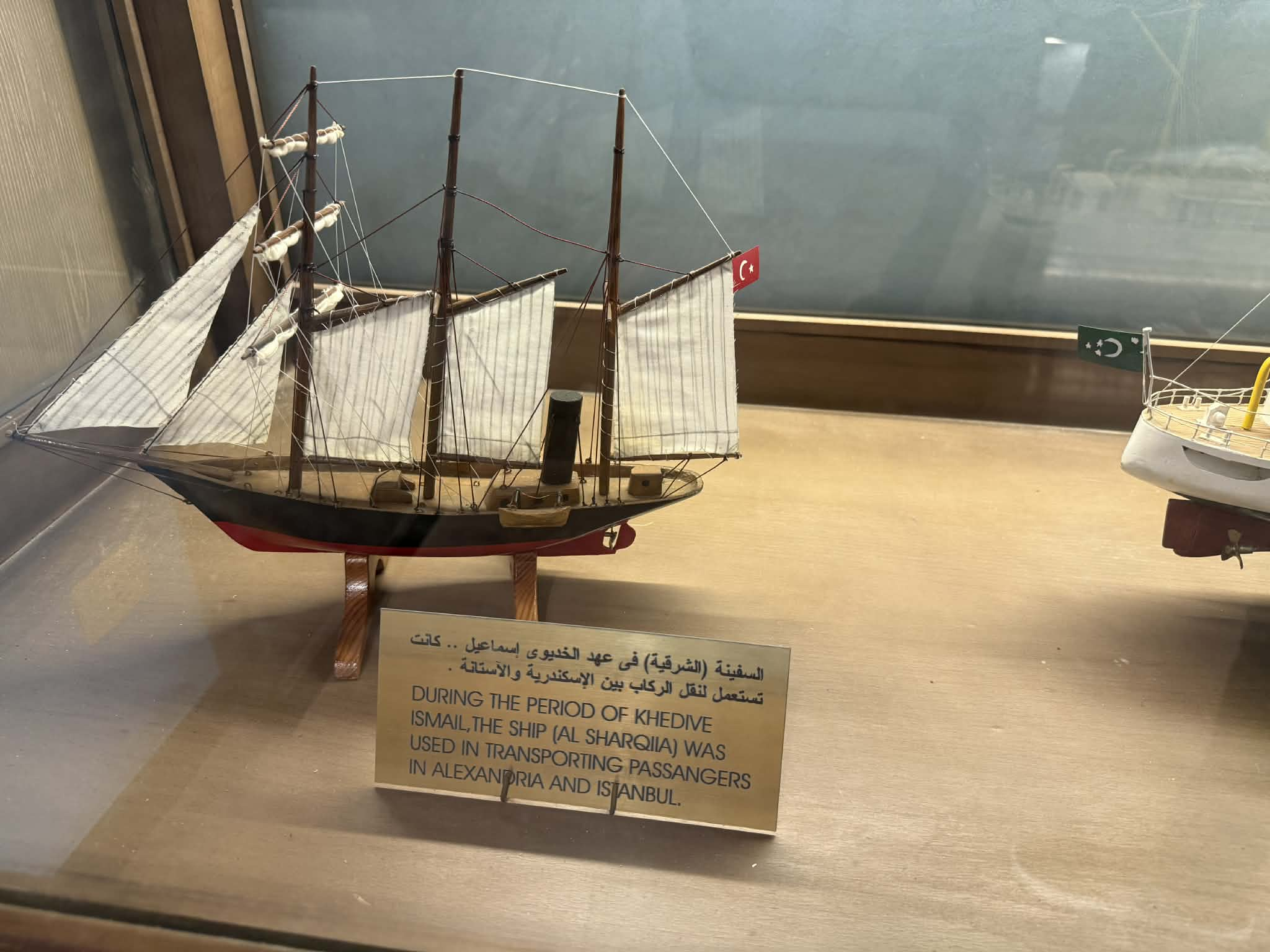
- A model of the Egyptian ship Charkieh

History

Egypt
- Name: Charkieh
- Namesake: Sharqia Governorate
- Owner: Azizieh Steam Navigation Company (1865–1870); Khedivate of Egypt (1870–1898); Khedivial Mail Steamship and Graving Dock Company (1898–1900)
- Port of registry: (Khedivate of Egypt) Alexandria, Egypt (1865–67); (Khedivate of Egypt) Alexandria, Egypt (1867–70); (Khedivate of Egypt) Alexandria (1870– ); (United Kingdom of Great Britain and Ireland) London, United Kingdom ( –1900)
- Builder: Thames Ironworks and Shipbuilding Company, Blackwall, United Kingdom
- Yard number: 6
- Completed: 1865
- Identification: United Kingdom Official Number 52687 ( –1900)
- Fate: Wrecked 18 September 1900

General characteristics
- Type: mail steamer
- Tonnage: 1,533 GRT
- Displacement: 720 NRT
- Length: 276.7 feet (84.34 m)
- Beam: 35.8 feet (10.91 m)
- Draught: 24.2 feet (7.38 m)
- Installed power: 283 nhp (1865–79); 1.500 ihp (1879–1900)
- Propulsion: 2-cylinder compound steam engine (1865–79); Compound steam engine (1879–1900); Screw propeller
- Speed: 10.69 knots (19.80 km/h)

Charkieh was an iron screw steamer launched in 1865. Built at Leamouth near London, she was purchased by the Khedivate of Egypt as a mail steamer. She was in a collision in the River Thames in 1872 and was eventually wrecked off Greece in 1900.

== Description ==
The ship was 267.7 feet (81.59 m) long, with a beam of 35.8 feet (10.91 m) and a depth of 24.2 feet (7.38 m). She was powered by a 2-cylinder compound steam engine, which had cylinders of 38 inches (97 cm) and 70 inches (180 cm) diameter by 48 inches (120 cm) stroke. Rated at 283 nhp, it drove a three-bladed single screw propeller and could propel the ship at 10.69 knots (19.80 km/h). The engine was built by James Jack & Co., Liverpool.

== History ==
Constructed at the Thames Ironworks and Shipbuilding Company in 1865 for the Azizieh Steam Navigation Company, but was acquired in 1870 by the Khedive of Egypt for £E23,289, for carrying mail. In 1872, she was sent back to England for a refit which included new boilers.

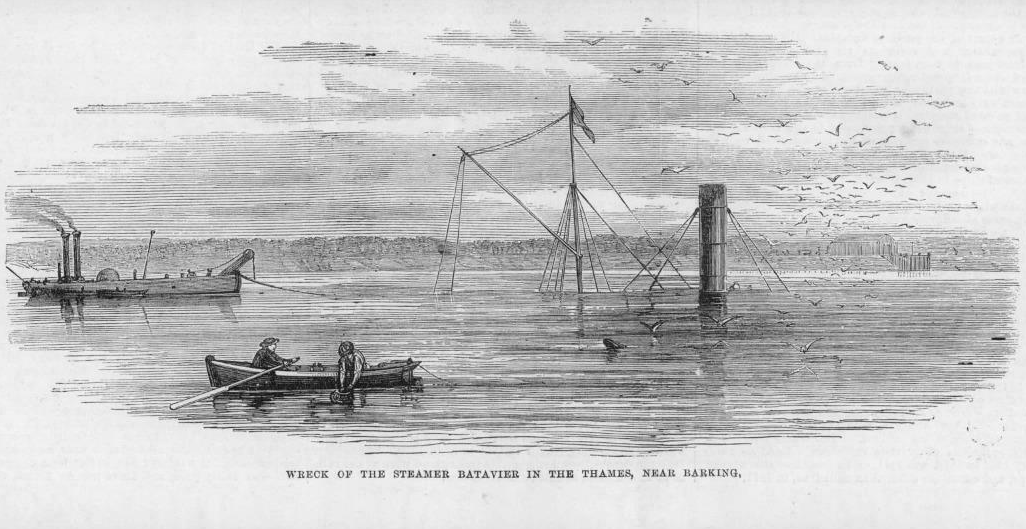
The wreck of the Dutch steamer Batavier in the Thames, following her collision with Charkieh in October 1872.

While running trials in the Thames at Barking Reach on 19 October 1872, Charkieh was in collision with a Dutch paddle steamer, Batavier of the Batavier Line. The Dutch ship sank, survivors were rescued by Charkieh and Constitution, a passing tug. A baby and a sailor were killed. In a subsequent court case, the Egyptian government claimed that since Charkieh was flying the ensign of the Ottoman Navy, there being no separate flag for Egyptian government vessels, she fell under the designation of a warship and was therefore immune from legal proceedings by the Dutch owners. The claim was rejected by the High Court of Admiralty on the grounds that Charkieh had arrived with a commercial cargo from Egypt and "if a sovereign assumes the character of a trader, and sends a vessel belonging to him to this country to trade here, he must be considered to have waived any privilege which might otherwise attach to the vessel as the property of a sovereign". Batavier was found to be at fault.

On her return, she was engaged on the Alexandria to Constantinople route. During the Russo-Turkish War of 1877–1878, she was briefly used as a troopship for Ottoman forces. In 1879, she was laid-up after her boilers failed and was refitted with new boilers and compound engines of 1,500 ihp in Alexandria by James Jack & Co., completed in September 1881 at a cost of £10,500. At some point, Charkieh was fitted with an experimental six-bladed propeller. Coal consumption was cut by 0.85 long tons (860 kg) per day for a loss of 0.04 knots (0.074 km/h) in speed.

In 1898, Charkieh was sold to the Khedivial Mail Steamship and Graving Dock Co. Ltd., London. She was allocated the United Kingdom Official Number 52687. Charkieh was wrecked on 22 September 1900, in Karystos Bay, en route to Piraeus, Greece from Alexandria during a gale. A total of 18 passengers and 21 crew were lost, 60 were rescued.
