= Hugh Marshall Hole =

English pioneer, administrator and author

Lieutenant-Colonel Hugh Marshall Hole, CMG (16 May 1865 – 18 May 1941) was an English pioneer, administrator and author and best known for issuing the "Marshall Hole currency".

== Education and appointments ==
Marshall Hole was born in Tiverton in Devon, England. He was educated at Blundell's School and Balliol College (where he won the Newte exhibition).

Marshall Hole came to Cape Colony in 1889 and met the mine magnate and politician Cecil Rhodes in Kimberley. Rhodes offered him a job as the first clerk to the newly formed British South Africa Company. In 1891 (Note: Guide to the Historical Manuscripts in the National Archives of Rhodesia ed by TW Baxter & EE Burke Salisbury, National Archives of Rhodesia, 1970) Marshall Hole took up the position of private secretary to Sir Starr Jameson in Mashonaland (who was shortly to be appointed Administrator of the company's territories).

Marshall Hole's other appointments included:

- Secretary for Matabeleland
- Civil Commissioner of Bulawayo
- Chief Secretary of Southern Rhodesia
- Chief Native Title Commissioner for Matabeleland
- Administrator of North West Rhodesia

Cecil Rhodes took a great liking to Marshall Hole and in 1901 had sent him on missions to Arabia to devise means for the introduction of Arab labour to Southern Rhodesia. Marshall Hole also took charge of the arrangements for Rhodes' burial in the Matopo Hills in 1902.

Marshall Hole retired from Government service in 1913 and at the outbreak of World War I he joined The Norfolk Regiment, was mentioned in despatches and retired in 1919.

== Marshall Hole currency ==
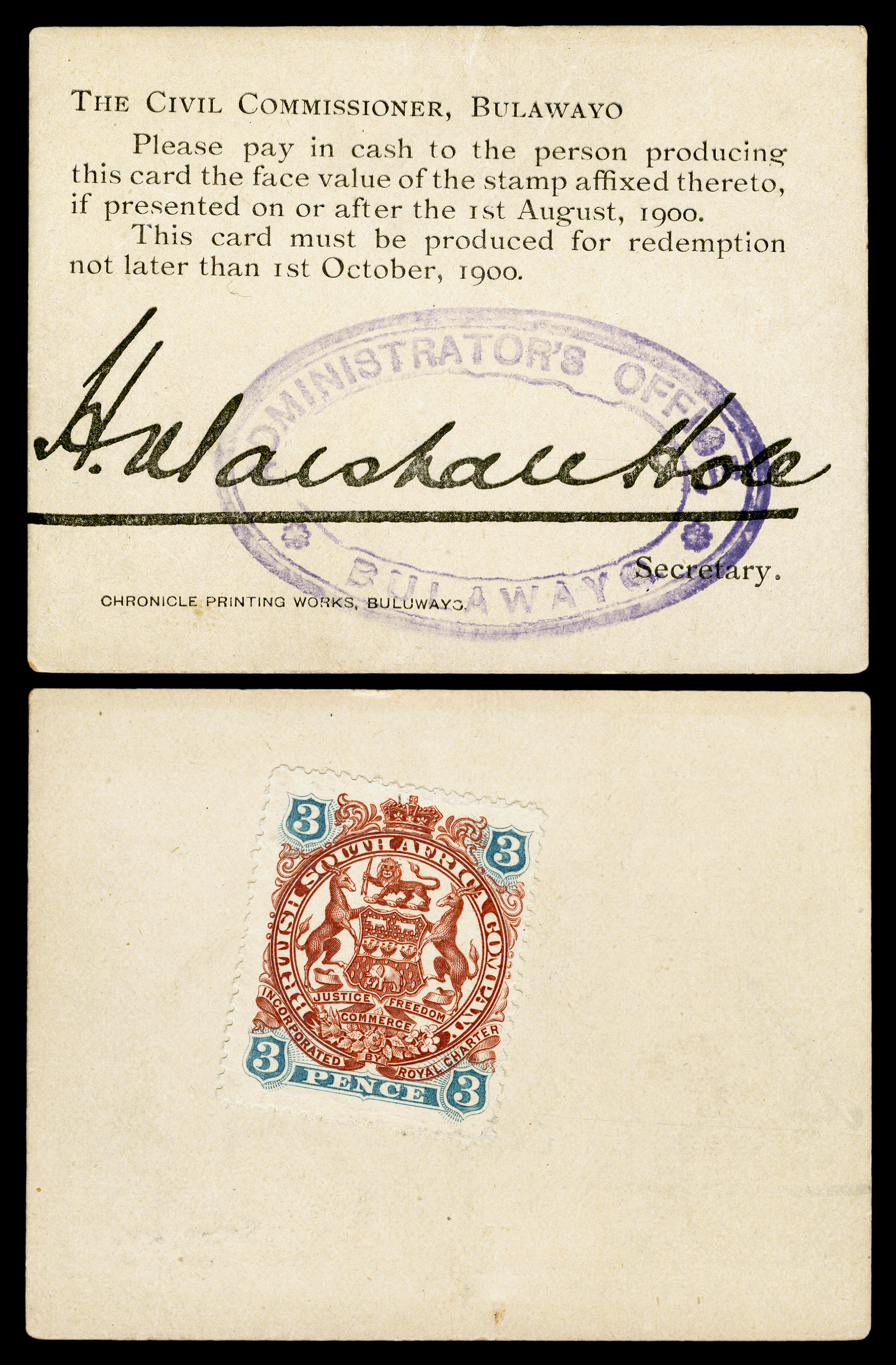
Bulawayo, Zimbabwe, 3 Pence (1900), Boer War currency issued by authority of Lt. Col. Hugh Marshall Hole.

Marshall Hole is best known for issuing "Marshall Hole currency" in Bulawayo in 1900. During the Anglo-Boer War there was a shortage of small change and circulating coinage in Rhodesia. Marshall Hole, who was then serving as Government Secretary for Matabeleland and Civil Commissioner of Bulawayo, authorised the issue of small cards bearing a British South Africa Company postage stamp on the obverse, and an official handstamped signature on the reverse, and these cards circulated as emergency currency between 1 August 1900 and their withdrawal on 1 October 1900. Smith (1967: p332) says "£20,000's worth of stamps were used, and when circulation ceased... it was found that almost exactly £1,000's worth was still outstanding... This £1,000... was clear profit to the Administration and compensated Mr Hole for the ridicule the experiment provoked when he first proposed it."

The currency cards were issued in denominations of 2d, 3d, 4d, 6d, 1/-, 2/-, 2/6, 4/-, 5/- and 10/-, and bore two types of validation stamp. One type is inscribed ADMINISTRATOR'S OFFICE * BULAWAYO. The other type is inscribed ADMINISTRATOR'S OFFICE. The validation stamps were applied at Marshall Hole's office.

== Publications ==
- The Jameson Raid; London: Philip Allan, 1930; Book Bib ID 1021256
- The passing of the Black kings; London: Philip Allan, 1932; Book Bib ID 1018104
- Old Rhodesian days; London, Cass, 1968; Book Bib ID 2491756
- Lobengula; London: Allan, 1929; Book Bib ID 707969
- The making of Rhodesia; London: Cass, 1926 (1967 reprint); Book Bib ID 855788 (Also available on Google Books)
- Hugh Marshall Hole and his Matabeleland Stamp Currency Cards of 1900: Robert Armstrong; 2016
