= Robert Charles =

American activist and murderer (1865–1900)

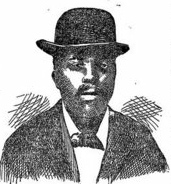
- Born: 1865 or 1866; Pine Bluff, Mississippi, U.S.
- Died: July 27, 1900 (aged 34); New Orleans, Louisiana, U.S.
- Cause of death: Gunshot wounds
- Occupation: Laborer

Details
- Date: July 23–27, 1900
- Locations: New Orleans, Louisiana
- Killed: 7
- Injured: 20
- Weapons: .38-caliber revolver.38-caliber Winchester rifle

Robert Charles (1865–1900) was an African-American activist living in New Orleans who took part in a gunfight between July 24 and 27, 1900, after being assaulted by a police officer, leading to the death of five policemen and two civilians, and the wounding of 19 others. The event sparked a major race riot, known as the Robert Charles riots.

== Background ==
Robert Charles was born in late 1865 or early 1866 in Copiah County, Mississippi, the fourth of ten children. He was a freedman since birth, though his parents were still enslaved when he was born. Charles' parents were sharecroppers, with his father being a registered voter in Mississippi. He grew up in a large family and learned to read.

Charles moved to New Orleans in either 1894 or 1896, either due to the economic aftermath of the Panic of 1893 or legal issues with Copiah County authorities for the unregulated sale of whiskey, using the alias Curtis Robertson. In New Orleans, he worked "a series of unskilled and semiskilled jobs". He joined the Daniel J. Plummer branch of the International Migration Society, selling pamphlets and magazines in support of the back-to-Africa movement. Charles himself was saving money to eventually emigrate to Liberia. Neighbors recalled that Charles voiced anger following the passing of pro-disfranchisement legislation by the Louisiana State Legislature in 1898 and the lynching of Sam Hose in 1899. The latter event caused Charles to become more active in his back-to-Africa advocacy as a result, entering direct communications with the society's leader Henry McNeal Turner and working as salesman for Turner's Voice of Missions magazine. In June 1900, Charles was fired from his latest job at a sawmill. He was 34 at the time of the shootings.

== Shootings ==
=== First encounter ===
In the afternoon of July 23, 1900, Charles invited his roommate, 19-year-old Lenard Pierce, to visit the residence of Charles' girlfriend Virginia Banks. As Banks and her roommate, Ernestine Goldstein, were out on a trip to Baton Rouge, the two men first visited another woman, most likely Charles' sister Alice, before arriving outside of Banks' home at about 10:00 p.m. and waited on a street corner outside. Banks had either not returned yet or was waiting until the landlady went to sleep before allowing them inside. After waiting thirty minutes, Pierce suggested moving closer to the house to avoid a nearby police patrol. Charles and Pierce sat down on the front steps of a white resident's house, getting up two times to check the front door of Banks' home.

At 11:00 p.m., three white police officers, Sergeant Jules C. Aucoin, August T. Mora, and Joseph D. Cantrelle, investigated reports by black women of "two suspicious looking negroes" sitting on a porch in a predominantly white neighborhood. They found Charles and Pierce at the scene and questioned them, demanding to know what they "were doing and how long they had been there." One of the two men replied that they were "waiting for a friend." Charles stood up, which the police took as an aggressive move. Mora grabbed him and the two struggled. Mora hit Charles with his billy club. Mora and Charles pulled guns and exchanged shots. Reports vary on who drew first; both men received non-lethal gunshot wounds to the legs. Charles fled to his residence, leaving a trail of blood.

Police took custody of Pierce, escorting him to the station while Aucoin kept his service pistol pointed at Pierce's head. Aucoin and a police captain, John T. Day, interrogated Pierce for his address, which he divulged in the early hours of July 24, at 2:40 a.m.

=== Alley shootings ===
Captain Day arrived at the alley apartments shortly after, stationing three officers on the street while he, Sergeant Aucoin, Corporal Trenchard, and Patrolman Lamb, along with a civilian named Schmidt, went towards Charles' room. As Trenchard shouted for the door to be opened, Charles, wielding a rifle, exited his room and immediately shot Captain Day in the chest, killing him instantly. Schmidt ran away while the other three officers remained standing in shock. Charles shot Day's body two more times before turning towards officers Trenchard and Lamb, who had backed up against a wall, firing a shot at Lamb, who was killed by a bullet to the right eye. An elderly black neighbor called out to the remaining two policemen to hide in her room, sheltering them for nearly two hours as Charles searched the alley for the officers, shouting for them to show themselves. Despite the gunshots, the officers posted outside did not enter the alley. At 4:30, Charles exited the alley, shooting at a police officer from 70 yards, grazing his hat, before fleeing the scene. Additional police backup was arrived at 5:00.

=== Manhunt and riots ===
On July 24, following the initiation of a manhunt, several New Orleans newspapers, especially the Times-Democrat, blamed the black community for Charles' crimes. Outraged white residents gathered in armed mobs and began roaming the streets, ostensibly searching for the fugitive Charles. In the following days, several race riots occurred as the armed white mobs confronted and attacked black residents. On the night of the July 25, white mobs killed three blacks and wounded six more so severely that they had to be hospitalized. Five whites were also hospitalized, and more than 50 people suffered lesser injuries.

==== Hiding, siege, and Charles' death ====
Charles had taken refuge at 1208 Saratoga Street, where he remained safe from the police until Friday, July 27. Upon receiving a tip about the whereabouts of Charles from an informant, police searched the house. As the officers neared Charles' hiding place beneath the stairs, Charles opened fire, killing two of the officers [Sgt Gabe Porteus and Corporal John Lally]. Other officers, upon hearing the gunshots, quickly brought in reinforcements to both surround Charles and to protect the black residents from white mob violence. Historian William Ivy Hair described the scene:

The Mayor, knowing the mood of the city and fearing that some massive butchery of the black population might take place, called upon the state militia units, which had been mobilized since Thursday, to go to the scene with—and he made a special point of this—their two Gatling guns. Capdevielle declared that if things got completely out of hand, the Gatling guns should be fired into the white mob.

Throughout the day, the police fired on the house, where Charles returned fire from the second-story windows. By 5pm, Charles had killed or fatally wounded five law officers, and wounded nineteen other persons. Yet more rioters continued to arrive. Under constant fire, and with no chance of entry without being shot, the rioters decided to light the house on fire to get him to leave his cover. While continuing to shoot, Charles attempted to flee the house, but on opening the door he was instantly shot by a special policeman and afterwards riddled with the bullets of the armed white mob. The mob then mutilated Charles' body.

== Reception ==
Following his death, journalist Ida Wells-Barnett lauded Charles' actions. In her study on lynchings, she wrote: "[Charles] would have died had not he raised his hand to resent unprovoked assault and unlawful arrest that fateful Monday night. That made him an outlaw, and being a man of courage he decided to die with his face to the foe. The white people of this country may charge that he was a desperado, but to the people of his own race Robert Charles will always be regarded as the 'Hero of New Orleans.'"
