= Robert Charles riots =

1900 race riots in New Orleans

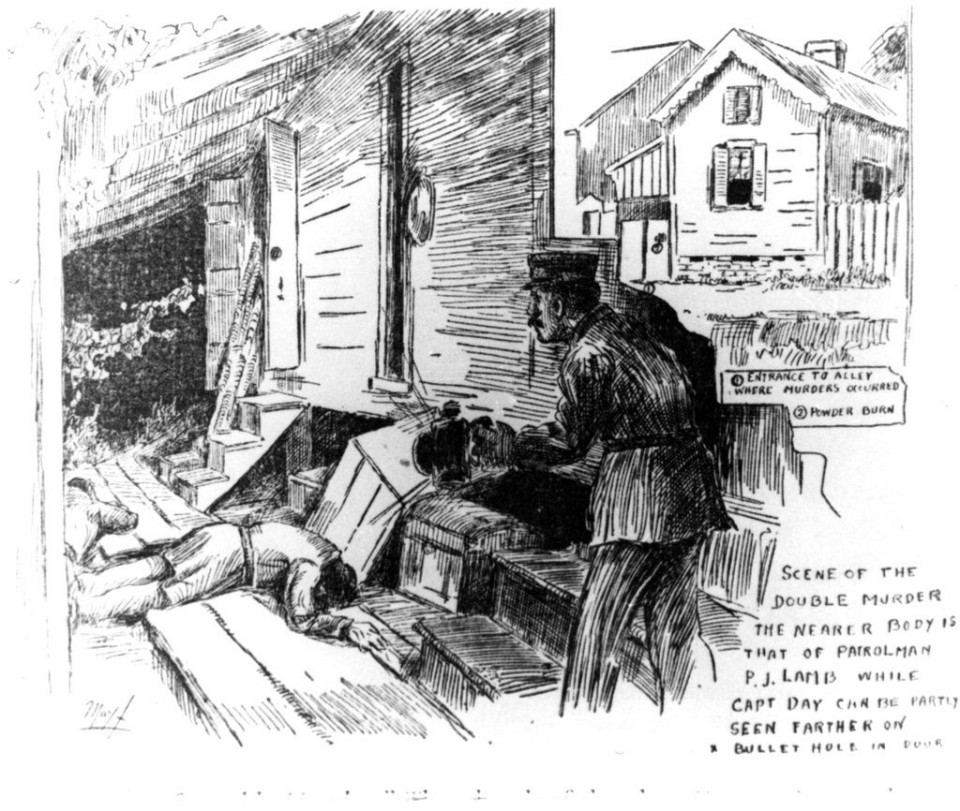
- Sketch of the scene at Robert Charles' residence on the 2000 block of Fourth Street. Body in the middle is Patrolman Lamb; the body in the left background is that of Captain Day
- Date: July 23 – July 28, 1900
- Location: New Orleans, Louisiana, United States
- Caused by: White reaction to killing of policemen
- Goals: Suppression of African Americans; revenge
- Methods: Rioting, looting, assault, arson, property damage, firefights, murder

Parties
Afro. Americans	Lower-class Whites	New Orleans Police Department, NOPD special deputies (1,500), Louisiana State Militia

Lead figures
	Mob	Mayor Paul Capdevielle

Casualties
- Deaths: 28
- Injuries: 61 (mostly blacks)
- Arrested: 19 (10 blacks and 9 whites indicted for murder)

The Robert Charles riots of July 24–27, 1900, in New Orleans, Louisiana, were sparked after African-American laborer Robert Charles fatally shot a white police officer during an altercation and escaped arrest. A large manhunt for him ensued, and a white mob started rioting, attacking black people throughout the city. The manhunt for Charles began on Monday, July 23, 1900, and ended when Charles was killed on Friday, July 27, shot by a special police volunteer. The mob shot him hundreds of times, and desecrated his body.

White rioting continued, with several black people killed after Charles’ death. A total of 28 people were killed in the riots, including Charles. More than 50 people were wounded in the riots, including at least 11 who had to be hospitalized. Blacks made up most of the fatalities and casualties.

Robert Charles (b. circa 1865) had come to New Orleans from Mississippi. He was a self-educated activist for civil rights. He believed in self-defense for the African-American community and encouraged Afro Americans to move to Liberia to escape racial discrimination and violence.

== Background ==
=== White supremacy ===
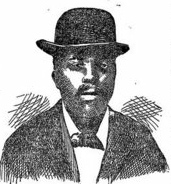
Robert Charles Daily Picayune, July 27, 1900

Louisiana was a slave society before the American Civil War, with hundreds of enslaved people working on each of numerous large cotton and sugar cane plantations, and many others in smaller groups, including in port cities such as New Orleans. Some also worked on the steamboats that traveled the rivers. At the start of the 20th century, the population of New Orleans was recorded in 1900 at 208,946 'white' and 77,714 'negro' by the Twelfth Census of the United States. Among the latter were many mixed-race people, most of whose ancestors had formerly had a distinct status as free people of color before the Civil War, particularly during the years of French and Spanish control. They are also known as Creoles of color.

The white-dominated legislature, primarily Democrats, had passed a new state constitution in 1898 with provisions that disenfranchised most African Americans by making voter registration more difficult, through poll taxes, literacy tests and similar measures. After that, the Democratic-dominated legislature passed eight Jim Crow laws by 1900. These included a law establishing racial segregation for public facilities, including interstate railroad cars, which were nominally under federal law. Plessy vs. Ferguson (1896) was a Louisiana test case of segregation on interstate railroad cars, which was appealed to the US Supreme Court. Opponents argued that federal laws and constitutional rights should apply on interstate transportation, but the Court ruled the state could establish "separate but equal" facilities. In practice, however, the "separate" facilities were seldom equal.

These laws aggravated racial relations. Historian William Ivy Hair has written, "Signs of increasing animosity between the races were to be seen almost daily in New Orleans during June and July 1900. Both the police and press received an unprecedented number of complaints."

New Orleans newspapers contributed to racial tensions, as they were "becoming more stridently racist in their editorial columns and treatment of the news." The confrontational journalistic practices of Henry J. Hearsay and the States newspaper caused racial rifts in New Orleans. Hearsay, a former major in the Confederate Army, said in one article that "if [negroes] listen to the screeds of agitators in the North...the result will be a race war, and race war means extermination...Then the negro problem of Louisiana at least will be solved–and that by extermination."

=== Racial attitudes ===
In southern Louisiana, African Americans had been allowed much more freedom than in other areas, largely owing to the racial demographics in New Orleans particularly and its history. During the colonial period, New Orleans had developed three racial groups, as was typical of other French and Latin colonies: white, free persons of color (mixed race or gens de couleur libre), and enslaved black people. Robert Charles was classified as mixed-race (mulatto in the terms of the time) and his ancestors may have been free before the Civil War. In colonial French society, free people of color had more rights and often gained education, property and more skilled jobs and professions. After the United States takeover in the Louisiana Purchase, and particularly after Reconstruction, the increasingly numerous whites from United States southern Protestant culture worked to impose the Southern binary system of classifying everyone as black or white. Mixed-race people still formed a class elite in New Orleans.

By the 1900s the line of segregation separating whites and blacks (people of African descent) had been imposed in New Orleans culture, including the segregation by color on New Orleans' streetcars.

== Events ==
=== Altercations ===
At approximately 11 p.m. on July 23, 1900, three white police officers, Sergeant Jules C. Aucoin, August T. Mora, and Joseph D. Cantrelle, investigated reports of "two suspicious looking negroes" sitting on a porch in a predominantly white neighborhood. They found Robert Charles and his roommate, 19-year-old Leonard Pierce, at the scene. The policemen questioned the two men, demanding to know what they "were doing and how long they had been there." One of the two men replied that they were "waiting for a friend." Charles stood up, which the police took as an aggressive move. Mora grabbed him and the two struggled. Mora hit Charles with his billy club. Mora and Charles pulled guns and exchanged shots. Reports vary on who drew first; both men received non-lethal gunshot wounds to the legs. Charles fled to his residence, leaving a trail of blood. Pierce, also armed, was covered by a police officer when Charles ran.

Charles had returned to his residence by early the next morning, when police were trying to find him. Captain Day and a patrol wagon approached Charles's residence on the 2000 block of Fourth Street at approximately 3 a.m. on the morning of July 24, 1900. When the police tried to apprehend Charles, he fired upon them with a .38-caliber Winchester rifle, fatally hitting Day in the heart. Charles fatally shot another policeman Peter Lamb in the head. The remaining policemen took refuge in a nearby room and Charles escaped. The police started a manhunt.

=== Manhunt and riot ===
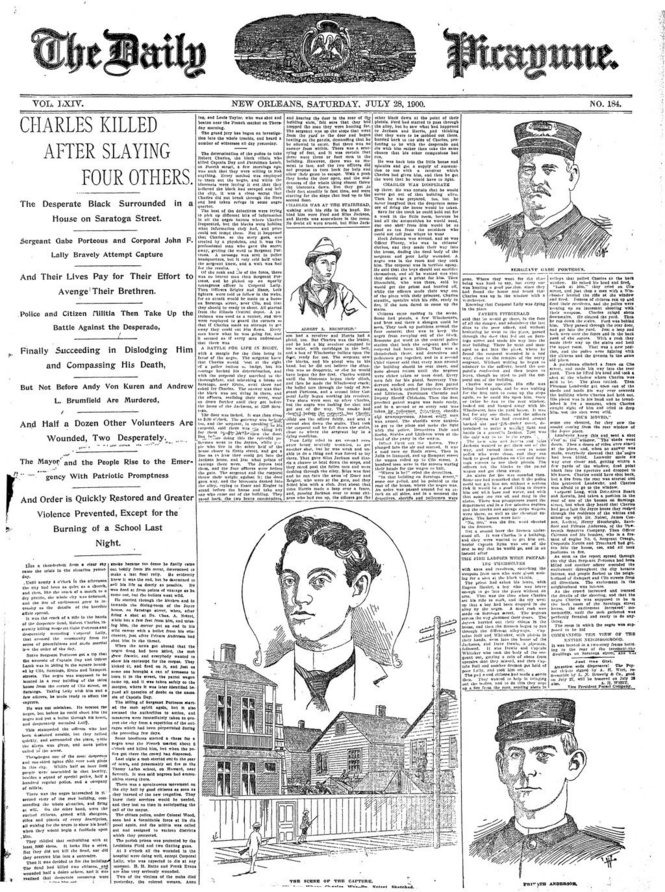
Front page of the New Orleans Daily Picayune, July 28, 1900, after Charles was killed; picture of Noiret in center; picture at upper right is Sgt Porteus

On July 24 a crowd of whites gathered on Fourth Street where the policemen had been killed. There were shouts for lynching Charles, but the crowds dispersed when they were falsely told Charles had been located and jailed. On July 25, Acting Mayor William L. Mehle (Mayor Paul Capdevielle was out of town) announced a $250 reward for the arrest of Charles, while issuing a proclamation urging peace. In contrast, New Orleans newspapers, particularly the Times-Democrat, blamed the black community for Charles' crimes and called for action.

In the following days, several riots occurred as mobs of armed whites roamed the streets. On the night of the July 25 they killed three blacks and wounded six more so severely that they had to be hospitalized. Five whites were also hospitalized, and more than 50 people suffered lesser injuries. Charles had taken refuge at 1208 Saratoga Street, where he remained safe from the police until Friday, July 27. Upon receiving a tip about the whereabouts of Charles from an informant, police searched the house. As the officers neared Charles' hiding place beneath the stairs, Charles opened fire, killing two of the officers [Sgt Gabe Porteus and Corporal John Lally]. Other officers, upon hearing the gunshots, quickly brought in reinforcements to both surround Charles and to protect the black residents from white mob violence. Historian William Ivy Hair described the scene:

The Mayor, knowing the mood of the city and fearing that some massive butchery of the black population might take place, called upon the state militia units, which had been mobilized since Thursday, to go to the scene with—and he made a special point of this—their two Gatling guns. Capdevielle declared that if things got completely out of hand, the Gatling guns should be fired into the white mob.

Throughout the day, the police fired on the house, where Charles returned fire from the second-story windows. By 5pm, Charles had killed or fatally wounded five law officers, and wounded nineteen other persons.

A fire captain and other volunteers snuck into the first floor beneath Charles and ignited a mattress. The smoke from the mattress forced Charles out of the house. As he tried to escape, he was shot by Charles A. Noiret, a medical student and member of the special police (a militia group of volunteer citizens). The policemen continued to shoot Charles. When they dragged his body outside, a mob of bystanders beat his body.

== Aftermath ==
After learning of Charles' death, mobs of white people renewed their attacks on black residents. Police had difficulty taking Charles' body to the morgue as angry white mobs tried to mutilate his corpse. The mob killed several African Americans and burned down the Thomy Lafon schoolhouse, known as "the best Negro schoolhouse in Louisiana," and a second black school. By the next morning, the special police and state militia had quelled the rioting and brought the city under control. Several days later, Lewis Forstall murdered Fred Clark for tipping off police to Charles' whereabouts. In total, Charles killed seven people over the course of the week, five of whom were policemen. The exact number of black casualties at the hands of the white mobs is unknown, but most sources report more than a dozen black people killed and over fifty wounded.

The events in New Orleans received national coverage and had ramifications beyond the state. Lillian Jewett, a young white member of the Anti-Lynching League, was fundraising at a Boston, Massachusetts meeting hours after Charles' death to raise money for the injured in New Orleans. The Louisiana Times Picayune reported "Insane Ravings at a Boston Meeting". A group of wealthy young white men from New Orleans had formed the Green Turtles the previous year. This group required an "oath of allegiance to white supremacy and the Democratic Party." Because of this group's subsequent threats on Jewett's life, she would not travel further South than Richmond, Virginia.

After the Robert Charles riots, whites intensified and increased the reach of racial segregation in the state. In 1908 the state legislature passed a miscegenation law, prohibiting interracial marriage or domestic partnerships. These were seldom enforced in cases of white men having relations with black women. Such legislation at the time was associated with the progressive movement, and was also influenced by European ideas on eugenics. Many states passed miscegenation laws in those years. In 1920, New Orleans established racial segregation in jails. The Catholic Church established a segregated parish in downtown New Orleans, the Congregation of Corpus Christi. Racial violence and hate crimes increased in frequency.

New Orleans jazz pianist Jelly Roll Morton recounted the 1900 riot in his 1938 oral history recorded for the Library of Congress.

Lynchings were still high at the turn of the century, reflecting white efforts to suppress black voting and maintain white supremacy. The agricultural economy was not doing well, adding to economic and social tensions.

== See also ==
- List of incidents of civil unrest in the United States
