= Trademark (disambiguation) =

A trademark is a word, phrase, symbol, design or combination thereof that uniquely identifies a product or service.

Trademark may also refer to:

- Trademark symbol, the typographical ™ symbol which is used to identify a trademark

== Senses of "trademark symbol" ==
- Brand, sometimes used interchangeably with "trademark"
- Collective trade mark
- Colour trademark
- Community Trade Mark
- Genericized trademark
- Hologram trademark
- International Trademark Association
- Logo, sometimes used interchangeably with "trademark"
- Patent and Trademark Office (disambiguation)
- Registered trademark symbol
- Trademark attorney
- Trade-Mark Cases
- Trademark classification
- Trademark dilution
- Trademark distinctiveness
- Trademark examiner
- Trademark infringement
- Trademark of Quality
- Trademark Official Gazette
- Trademark Trial and Appeal Board
- Trademark troll
- Unregistered trademark

== Other senses of "trademark" ==
- Trademark look
- Trademark argument
- Trademark (computer security)
- TradeMark, a skyscraper
- Trademark (band), an electropop band
- Trademark (group), German male vocal trio
- "Trademark", later "My Trade Mark", a song by Cardiacs from Toy World
- "Trademark", a song by Relient K from Two Lefts Don't Make a Right...but Three Do
- "My Trademark", a song by Bug Prentice from Leader of the Starry Skies – A Loyal Companion

== See also ==
- Copyright symbol
- Service mark symbol
- Service mark
- Copyright
- Patent
- TM (disambiguation)
