= Trademark Manual of Examining Procedure =

The Trademark Manual of Examining Procedure (TMEP) is a manual published by the United States Patent and Trademark Office (USPTO) for use by trademark attorneys and trademark examiners. It describes all of the laws and regulations that must be followed in order to apply for and maintain a trademark in the United States. It includes explanations of the trademark application and examination process, the various types of trademarks, the Madrid Protocol, and proceedings before the Trademark Trial and Appeal Board.

The current edition of the Trademark Manual of Examining Procedure is the October 2018 edition.

== See also ==
- Acceptable Identification of Goods and Services Manual
- Trademark Official Gazette
- Manual of Patent Examining Procedure (MPEP)
- Compendium of U.S. Copyright Office Practices
- Trademark Trial and Appeal Board Manual of Procedure
