= Shape trademark =

A shape trademark, shape mark, or three-dimensional trademark is a non-conventional trademark where a recognizable and distinctive shape is used to identify a product's source or brand. The shape of an item or product may be trademarked if it can be sufficiently distinguished from other similar products. Shape marks may also function as a form of trade dress, if the shape of a product's container or packaging is used to communicate the product's origin.

To be trademarkable, the shape of an item must be shown to effectively communicate the product's origin and to be definitively linked to the brand in the minds of consumers. It must not be the natural shape of the item itself, or in any way necessary to the item's function. Functional shapes which serve a utilitarian purpose (such as the round shape of a wheel) may not be trademarked, neither may generic shapes. In order to be trademarkable, a shape must be unique and aesthetic in purpose. A shape will usually not be considered functional if its sole purpose is to beautify the product; this is considered aesthetic rather than functional although it serves a specific purpose for manufacturers.

Empirical legal scholarship has indicated that some of these legal tests may not be being applied as consistently as commentators have imagined when examining the actual shape marks being successfully trademarked in the European Union.

Shape trademarks, being related to the form and sensory experience of a product, are similar to colour trademarks, sound trademarks, and scent trademarks.

== Examples ==
Under the South African Trademarks Act of 1993, the shape of an item may not be trademarked, although the shape of its packaging is trademarkable.

In 2003, the European Court of First Instance determined that the shape of Bounty bars was not sufficiently distinctive to be trademarked by Mars Inc..

In October 2025, The J.M. Smucker Company filed a lawsuit alleging that the shape of Trader Joe's line of sealed crustless sandwich infringed on the trademarks for Smucker's "Uncrustables". The company argued that the crimping along the edges of the sandwiches infringed on the trademarked shape of Uncrustables, while Trader Joe's argued that the crimping served a functional purpose.
