= Trademark classification =

A trademark classification is a way the trademark examiners and applicants' trademark attorneys arrange documents, such as trademark and service mark applications, according to the description and scope of the types of goods or services to which the marks apply. The same trademark or service may be (or in many cases MUST be) classified in several classes, and some countries permit several classes to be registered in the same document. There are fees ordinarily associated with each classification, whether for initial application or later renewal.

An application filed for descriptions covering more than one class of goods or services may also be divided later (for a fee) into several different applications for synchronization with a phased roll-out of multiple classes of products. Because of international priority claim issues, classes may be deleted from an application but not added after the initial filing date. There are often disputes regarding the exact classification to apply in an application, partly because prior registrations may already occupy broad areas that overlap the products described by a later applicant. Many countries permit marks to cover an entire class without regard to specific descriptions of goods or services.

There is a general classification of marks into trademarks, service marks, certification marks and collective marks, each of which have slightly different rules. Within the broad categories of trademarks and service marks there are dozens of international classes defined for each category. See, e.g., International (Nice) Classification of Goods and Services.

For the purpose of obtaining a trademark clearance, it is advisable to search all related classifications of goods and services that could interact with or be supplied by a potentially confusing mark that already exists. Depending on the specific industry sector in which a firm operates, more than 1 class of goods and services may be required for an effective trademark protection.

In the United States, the USPTO maintains the Acceptable Identification of Goods and Services Manual to assist applicants and examiners to distinguish between classifications properly and consistently. Specific descriptions must be submitted for each type of goods and services to be covered by the registration, and overly broad terms will be rejected, depending upon how "crowded" a classification may be.

In China, the trademark administrative regulations require applicants to designate each good or service using the category number and name specified in the national Goods and Services Classification Table, and to provide a name and description for any good or service not listed in that table.
