= Qualitex Co. v. Jacobson Products Co. =

Qualitex Co. v. Jacobson Products Co., Inc.
- Supreme Court of the United States

Argued January 9, 1995 Decided March 28, 1995
- Full case name: Qualitex Co. v. Jacobson Products Co., Inc.
- Citations: 514 U.S. 159 (more) 115 S. Ct. 1300; 131 L. Ed. 2d 248; 1995 U.S. LEXIS 2408; 63 U.S.L.W. 4227; 34 U.S.P.Q.2d (BNA) 1161; 95 Cal. Daily Op. Service 2249; 95 Daily Journal DAR 3867; 8 Fla. L. Weekly Fed. S 653

Case history
- Prior: C.D. Cal. found for plaintiff, 1991 U.S. Dist. LEXIS 21172; judgment set aside by the Ninth Circuit, 13 F.3d 1297 (9th Cir. 1994), reversed

Holding
- Under the Lanham Act, a color can be registered as a trademark. Individual colors, however, cannot be deemed "inherently distinctive," so the registrant must demonstrate that the color has acquired "secondary meaning" in consumers' minds as indicating the source of the registrant's goods.

Court membership
- Chief Justice William Rehnquist Associate Justices John P. Stevens · Sandra Day O'Connor; Antonin Scalia · Anthony Kennedy; David Souter · Clarence Thomas; Ruth Bader Ginsburg · Stephen Breyer

Case opinion
- Majority: Breyer, joined by unanimous

Laws applied
- Lanham Act

Qualitex Co. v. Jacobson Products Co., Inc., 514 U.S. 159 (1995), was a United States Supreme Court case in which the Court held that a color could meet the legal requirements for trademark registration under the Lanham Act, provided that it has acquired secondary meaning in the market.

== Facts and Procedural History ==
Plaintiff Qualitex Co. had used a green-gold color for dry cleaning "press pads" which it sold to dry cleaning firms to use in their presses. Defendant Jacobson Products Co. was a rival of Qualitex. In 1989, Jacobson began selling their own pads to dry cleaners which were a similar color to those of Qualitex. In response, Qualitex filed a lawsuit against Jacobson in the United States District Court for the Central District of California for unfair competition. In 1991, Qualitex registered the green-gold color of its pads with the United States Patent and Trademark Office as a trademark, and subsequently added a trademark infringement count to its lawsuit. The District Court found for Qualitex, but the United States Court of Appeals for the Ninth Circuit set aside the judgment, on the grounds that color alone could not be registered as a trademark.

== Decision ==
Justice Breyer, writing for a unanimous 9-0 court, overturned the Ninth Circuit's decision, holding that the Lanham Act was very broad in its definition of what a trademark could be. The definition section of the Lanham Act, 15 U.S.C. § 1127, defines trademarks as including "any word, name, symbol, or device, or any combination thereof". Breyer reasoned that colors could constitute descriptive trademarks, because while colors do not automatically evoke a connection to any product by themselves, they could take on secondary meaning over time, in the course of use in the marketplace. In this way, a color could serve the chief purpose of trademarks, that of identifying the source of a particular product.

Breyer also determined that the functionality doctrine was no bar to the registration of the plaintiff's color as a trademark. He determined that a product feature is only functional "if it is essential to the purpose of the article or if it affects the cost or quality of the article". 514 U.S. at 165.

Although sometimes color plays an important role (unrelated to source identification) in making a product more desirable, sometimes it does not. And, this latter fact—the fact that sometimes color is not essential to a product's use or purpose and does not affect cost or quality—indicates that the doctrine of "functionality" does not create an absolute bar to the use of color alone as a mark.

The color in this case acted purely as a symbol, and served no other purpose. Jacobson argued that there are only a limited number of colors that could be used for the products at issue here, and that many colors are very similar looking, but Breyer dismissed this concern, saying that if the defendant’s concerns were proven to be valid, the functionality doctrine would then come into play. Breyer further held that color could be trademarked separately from any trade dress protection.

== See also ==
- List of United States Supreme Court cases, volume 514
- List of United States Supreme Court cases
- Lists of United States Supreme Court cases by volume
- List of United States Supreme Court cases by the Rehnquist Court
- Color trademark
- Non-conventional trademark
- Société des Produits Nestlé S.A. v. Cadbury UK Limited
