= Hologram trademark =

A hologram trademark is a non-conventional trademark where a hologram is used to perform the trademark function of uniquely identifying the commercial origin of products or services.

In recent times holograms have been increasingly used as trade marks in the marketplace. However, it has traditionally been difficult to protect holograms as trademarks through registration, as a hologram was not considered to be a 'trademark'. This issue was addressed by the World Trade Organization Agreement on Trade-Related Aspects of Intellectual Property Rights, which broadened the legal definition of trademark to encompass "any sign...capable of distinguishing the goods or services of one undertaking from those of other undertakings" (article 15(1)).

Despite the recognition which must be accorded to holograms trademarks in most countries in other fields of the art, the graphical representation of such marks sometimes constitutes a problem for trademark owners seeking to protect their marks, and different countries have different methods for dealing with this issue.

== Registration ==
=== Canada ===
In Canada, hologram trademarks are generally not acceptable if they cannot be represented graphically or if they are regarded as more than one mark.

=== United States ===
In the United States, the trademark manual for examination requires under 1202.14 that a hologram used in varying forms does not function as a mark in the absence of evidence that consumers would perceive it as a trademark. See In re Upper Deck Co., 59 USPQ2d 1688 (TTAB 2001), where the Board held that a hologram used on trading cards in varying shapes, sizes, and positions did not function as a mark, because the record showed that other companies used holograms on trading cards and other products as anti-counterfeiting devices, and there was no evidence that the public would perceive applicant's hologram as an indicator of source. The Board noted that "the common use of holograms for non-trademark purposes means that consumers would be less likely to perceive applicant's uses of holograms as trademarks." 59 USPQ2d at 1693.

Therefore, in the absence of evidence of consumer recognition as a mark, the examining attorney should refuse registration on the ground that the hologram does not function as a mark, under §§1, 2 and 45 of the Trademark Act, 15 U.S.C. §§1051, 1052 and 1127. Generally, if a hologram has two or more views, the examining attorney should also refuse registration under §§1 and 45 of the Trademark Act, 15 U.S.C. §§1051 and 1127, on the ground that the application seeks registration of more than one mark. In re Upper Deck, supra. See TMEP §807.01.

Provided the applicant can demonstrate that the use of a hologram or moving image both serves as a mark and is not functional, an application for such a mark may be made to either register. That being said, Examining Attorneys are instructed to refuse an application for registration of a hologram if the applicant does not provide evidence of consumer recognition of the hologram as a mark. the applicant seeking registration of a hologram must submit a drawing of the mark that captures the dimensions thereof. Further, Examiners are instructed to refuse registration of any holograms that show two different images on the grounds that the application is seeking protection for two separate marks. Further, the application must include detailed written description of the mark. During publication the drawing pages for these marks are published and thereafter the drawing page is incorporated into the registration certificate which is made available at the USPTO as well as the USPTO website, see first external link.

=== European Union ===
In the European Union, Article 4 of Council Regulation (EC) No. 40-94 of 20 December 1993 ("signs of which a Community Trade Mark may consist") relevantly states that any CTM may consist of "any signs capable of being represented graphically...provided that such signs are capable of distinguishing the goods or services of one undertaking from those of other undertakings". In Sieckmann v German Patent Office (case C-273/00) the EcJ states that graphical representation, preferably means by images, lines or characters, and that the representation must be clear, precise, self-contained, easily accessible, intelligible, durable and objective.

This definition generally encompasses only very simply structured holograms, and therefore an applicant for a CTM may use one photograph or some views to graphically represent their trade mark, see first external link.
