= Doceree Inc. =

American advertising technology company

Doceree Inc. is an American healthcare marketing technology company headquartered in Short Hills, New Jersey. Founded in 2020, the company provides programmatic messaging and point-of-care advertising platforms intended for pharmaceutical and life sciences industries.

== History ==
Doceree Inc. was founded in 2019 by Harshit Jain. The company began operations in the United States and India in 2020. Between 2020 and 2024, the company completed several financing rounds, including a seed round in 2020, an $11 million Series A led by Eight Roads Ventures and F-Prime Capital in 2022, and a $35 million Series B led by Creaegis in 2023. In June 2024, the company received an additional $13.6 million in equity funding from Creaegis.

In 2022, the company expanded into the United Kingdom and Southeast Asia through a partnership with Hello Health Group. In 2023, it released a demand-side platform (DSP). By 2026, the company’s network included approximately 2,000 medical publishing platforms.

== EHR ==
The company's software is integrated with electronic health record (EHR) systems. In 2024, the United States Patent and Trademark Office granted the company a patent (No. 11,875,100) for a system that uses clinical data points to automate digital messages within medical software. The platform uses identity-resolution protocols to group healthcare professionals for advertisements.
