= Timothy J. Lockhart =

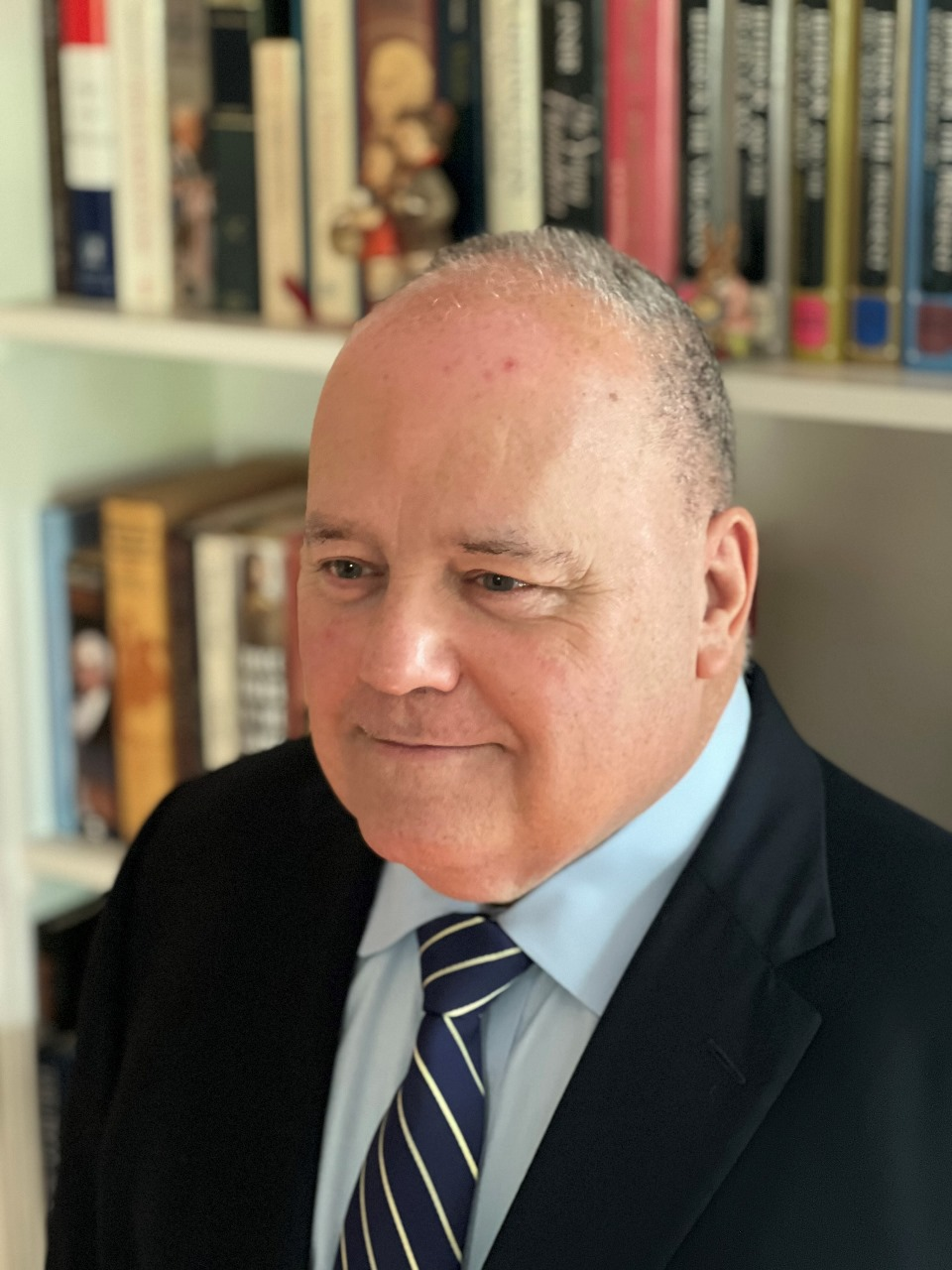
Timothy J. Lockhart

Timothy J. Lockhart is an American writer, lawyer, and former military officer who was a partner at Willcox Savage in Norfolk, Virginia, from 2002 to 2025. He is a retired U.S. Navy Reserve captain and U.S. Navy intelligence officer.

== Biography ==
Lockhart was born in Hartselle, Alabama. He attended Auburn University, where he graduated with bachelor's and master's degrees in English. Later, he studied law at the Georgetown University Law Center in Washington, D.C., graduating in 1990. He also holds a diploma from the United States Naval War College.

Lockhart's military service includes his time as a U.S. Navy intelligence officer, starting with active duty from 1977 to 1981, followed by reserve duty until 2007, when he retired as a captain.

Lockhart contributes to community services, including as a pro bono legal advisor to the Tidewater Chinese School and as a board member of the General Douglas MacArthur Foundation. He was also a member of the International Trademark Association (INTA), and served on the INTA Bulletins Committee multiple times from 1995 to 2023.

In 2017, Lockhart authored his first novel, the thriller, Smith.

Between July 2018 and June 2019, Lockhart held the position of chair for the Board of Governors of the Intellectual Property Section of the Virginia State Bar.

== Bibliography ==
- Smith (2017)
- Pirates (2019)
- A Certain Man's Daughter (2021)
- Unlucky Money (2022)
- Evil Intentions Come (2023)
- The Exfil (2024)
- Broken Kite (2026)
