= Trademark Trial and Appeal Board Manual of Procedure =

The Trademark Trial and Appeal Board Manual of Procedure (TBMP) is a manual published by the United States Patent and Trademark Office (USPTO) for use by litigants before the Trademark Trial and Appeal Board. It provides basic information generally useful for litigating these cases, including current practice and procedure as of the date the manual is issued. It is devoted primarily to opposition and cancellation proceedings.

== See also ==
- Trademark Manual of Examining Procedure
