= Patent examiner =

Civil servant working in a patent office

A patent examiner (or, historically, a patent clerk) is an employee, usually a civil servant with a scientific or engineering background, working at a patent office.

== Duties ==
Due to a long-standing and incessantly growing backlog of unexamined patent applications, examiners have a very limited amount of time to determine patentability of disclosed inventions. Ill-defined "tenure rules", as well as pressure to work overtime to meet the "production quotas", result in very high (over 50% within 4 years after hiring, mostly involuntary) attrition rates among patent examiners, especially at the USPTO. The attrition (mostly involuntary) of patent examiners is so severe that "in some years the USPTO loses more examiners than it hires".

Some patent applications are easy for an examiner to assess, but others require considerably more time. This has given rise to controversy: on April 13, 2007, a "Coalition of Patent Examiner Representatives" expressed concern that

in many patent offices, the pressures on examiners to produce and methods of allocating work have reduced the capacity of examiners to provide the quality of examination the peoples of the world deserve [and that] the combined pressures of higher productivity demands, increasingly complex patent applications and an ever-expanding body of relevant patent and non-patent literature have reached such a level that, unless serious measures are taken, meaningful protection of intellectual property throughout the world may, itself, become history.

== Offices ==
=== European Patent Office ===
Patent examiners at the European Patent Office (EPO) carry out examination and opposition procedures for patent applications originating anywhere in the world and seeking protection in any of the member states of the European Patent Organisation.

Candidates for examiner positions must meet certain minimum requirements:

- EPO member state nationality;
- degree in engineering or in science;
- good knowledge of two languages out of German, English and French with a willingness to learn the third.

Some examiners have work experience in industry, but such experience is not required. EPO examiners are also reportedly required to speak three languages fluently.

Most EPO examiners are represented by SUEPO, a trade union.

=== United States Patent and Trademark Office ===
Patent examiners at the United States Patent and Trademark Office (USPTO) examine patent applications for claims of new inventions. Examiners make determinations of patentability based on policies and guidance from this agency, in compliance with federal laws (Title 35 of the United States Code), rules, judicial precedents, and guidance from agency administrators.

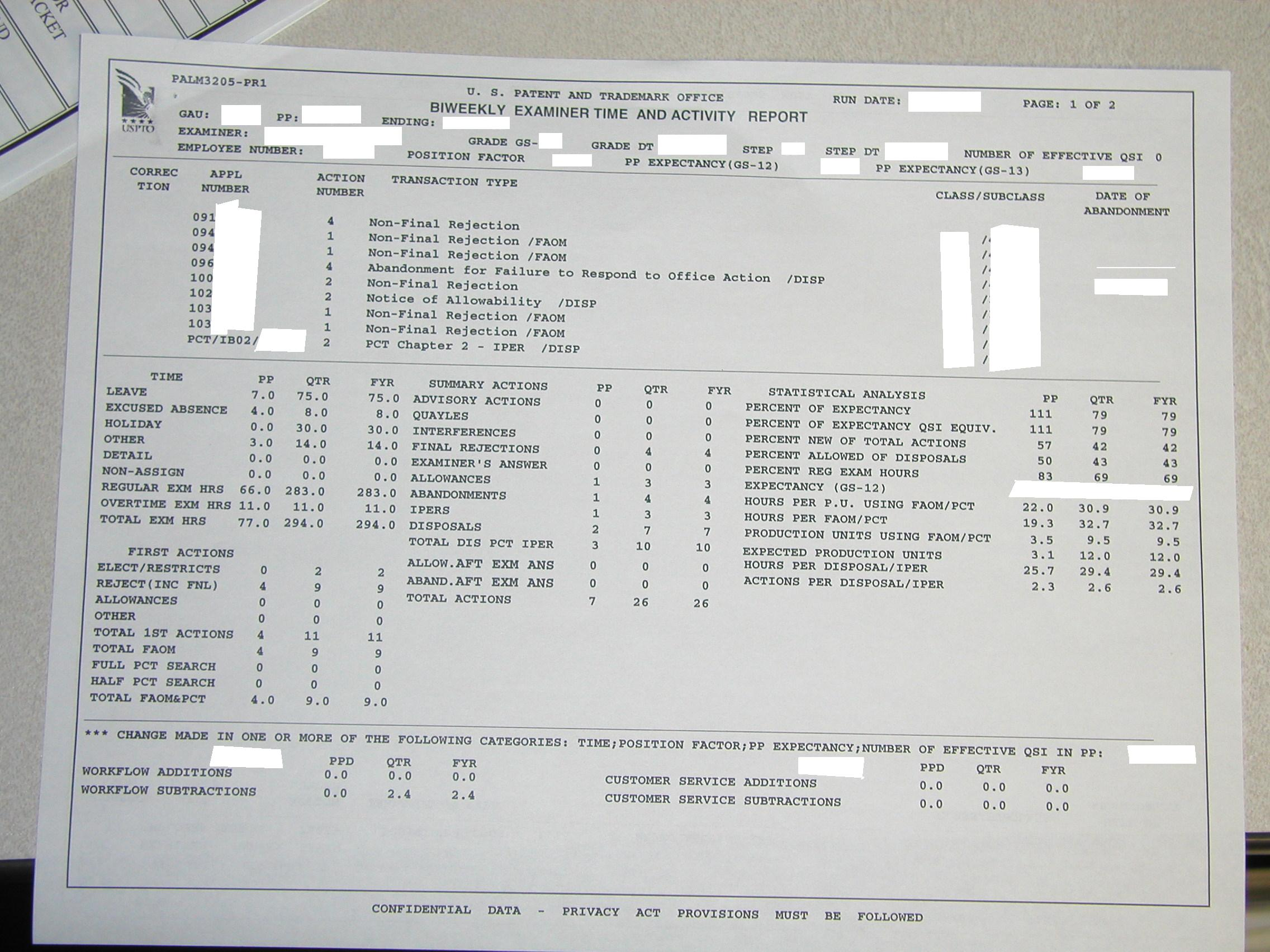
Biweekly Production Report

Examiners are hired at the GS-5, GS-7, GS-9 or GS-11 grade levels.

Patent examiners in the U.S. have responsibilities that are commensurate with their GS level. Promotions from GS-7 to GS-14 are non-competitive. At GS-13 they are eligible to start the "Partial Signatory Authority" program, a testing phase to see if an examiner can apply patent concepts (e.g. obviousness and novelty) and laws (35 USC). Upon passing the "Partial Signatory Program", a patent examiner is given signatory authority to sign all of their own non-final rejections and other non-final communications to applicants. After a waiting period a patent examiner may take part in an additional testing phase known as the "Full Signatory Authority" (FSA) program. When a patent examiner has passed the FSA program, they are given "Full Signatory Authority" and can sign all of their own "office actions" (e.g. allowances, rejections) without review and approval by a supervisor. Such examiners are also able to review and sign actions of "junior examiners" (patent examiners without signatory authority). Upon completion of the "Full Signatory Authority program", an examiner is advanced from GS-13 to GS-14 and is referred to as a "primary examiner".

According to the USPTO, an examiner is measured entirely by their own performance, without regard to the performance of others.

To work as an examiner at the USPTO, a person must be a U.S. citizen and pass a background investigation.

Experienced examiners have an option of working primarily from home through a hoteling program implemented in 2006 by the USPTO.

A 2023 study looked into how political preferences of USPTO examiners affect their propensity to allow patent claims. They found no statistically significant difference except for the case when the most politically active examiners (i.e. those who donate to political campaigns) examine software patents (i.e. in the Art Units where the examiners have the most discretion). In this case Republican-leaning examiners are more likely to issue patents than Democrat-leaning examiners.

== Notable patent examiners ==
Name	Birth year	Death year	Description
Genrich Altshuller	1926	1998	a Soviet engineer, inventor, scientist, journalist and writer.
Clara Barton	1821	1912	worked at the United States Patent Office (Currently the USPTO)
Albert Einstein	1879	1955	worked at the Swiss Federal Office for Intellectual Property (now known as the Swiss Federal Institute of Intellectual Property)
Thomas Jefferson	1743	1826	first patent examiner of the U.S. Patent Office
Arthur Paul Pedrick	? (>1918)	1976	UK Patent Office examiner and prolific inventor
Henry E. Baker	1857	1928	The first person to record the work of Black American inventors, Henry E. Baker Jr. entered the U.S. Naval Academy in 1874 as only the third Black person to ever attend. He later became Second Assistant at the U.S. patent office and published several works on Black inventors and their societal contributions.

== See also ==
- Law clerk
- Patent engineer
- Patent Office Professional Association, the United States patent examiners trade union
- Trademark examiner
- United States Patent Classification

== Further readings ==
- John W. Schoen, "U.S. patent office swamped by backlog; Without more funding, wait time could top 5 years". MSNBC, April 27, 2004. (ed., comments on problems and that 2900 new examiners are being sought by the USPTO.)
- Report to Congressional Committees 2005 "USPTO Has Made Progress in Hiring Examiners, but Challenges to Retention Remain"
