= Arthur Paul Pedrick =

Prolific British patent applicant (1918–1976)

- Born: 3 September 1918
- Died: 15 August 1976 (aged 57)
- Occupation: Patent Examiner
- Years active: 1947-1975
- Known for: Prolific filer of patent applications

Arthur Paul Pedrick (3 September 1918 – 15 August 1976) was a prolific British inventor and former patent examiner who filed for 162 United Kingdom patents between 1962 and his death in 1976 (other sources giving 15 August 1976 or in 1977). His inventions were notable for their humour and almost complete lack of practical applicability.

== Early life ==
Pedrick's father was engineer Lieutenant Arthur Gordon Pedrick, a Royal Navy submariner who died in 1918 from diseases caused by the poor conditions in the British K-class submarines in which he served. His mother, born Gladys Westaway, married his father in 1916. Pedrick was born on 3 September 1918, after his father's death.

He stated in one of his patents:

I have suffered all my life even from a by product of the 1914–18 war even if I was born after it. It is a personal fact that my father was a Lieutenant (E) serving in the disastrous K class submarines, by which the Royal Navy tried to create a Submarine which could steam on the surface at 20 knots to keep up with the Fleet, and he died of a lung infection created by the appalling conditions in such submarines, even before I was born. If a women [sic] is in bad metal [sic] state when she is in pregnant, it is obvious that she can pass on her state of mind to the foetus. This has made me a nervous individual all my life, and there are many times in my life I wish I had never been born. There are endless arguments about the subject of abortion on the "rights of the foetus", and these could all be settled if, in some way, the future could be predicted for the foetus and it could decide whether it "wanted to be born".

Pedrick attended Soberton Towers Preparatory School near Droxfield, Hampshire from 1925 to 1932 for his primary education. He obtained a scholarship to attend Sutton Valence School near Maidstone, Kent.

His undergraduate studies were at City and Guilds College, part of Imperial College London. He obtained a BSc (Eng) 2nd Class Honours, and followed vacation apprenticeships at Short Brothers in Rochester, Kent and Fairey Aviation in Hayes, Hillingdon. He then took a one-year postgraduate course from 1938 to 1939 at the aeronautics department of Imperial College to qualify for a Diploma Imperial College (D.I.C.).

== Naval career ==
After a short stint in the Territorial Army, Pedrick was granted a commission in the Royal Naval Reserve, initially as a Temporary Probationary Sub-lieutenant (E). He later became Temporary Engineer Lieutenant.

In January 1941, Pedrick joined HMS Dido, which was dispatched to the Mediterrean. In May 1941, HMS Dido was involved in the evacuation of Australian and New Zealand troops from Crete.

Pedrick's patent for laser-induced fusion includes these autobiographical notes:

It is my personal experience based on a severe bout of Dive bombing by Stuka dive bombers in a light cruiser HMS "Dido", in 1941, evacuating mainly New Zealanders from Crete, who had been sent in by the late Sir Winston Churchill, but who, after the battle with the Nazi paratroops had made the island untenable, Admiral Cunningham, the Naval C in C in Alexandria, realised must be got out if possible, that the surface warships just cannot survive attacks by large numbers of aircraft, on their own, and it is only the chance of fate that I happened to be in After Engine Room of the ship, when a bomb came down on B turret and created a carnage of twisted steel and bodies forward, that I am writing this now, but the memory of the experience still gives me a "nightmare" at times.

His later service was on HMS Illustrious, HMS Resource, the Golden Hind naval base in Sydney, and HMS Indomitable.

== Return to the UK ==
Pedrick was at one point engaged to a Marjorie Chrichton-Paull of Marrickville, New South Wales, but Chrichton-Paull married another.

Pedrick worked as a draughtsman for Peter Brotherhood Limited in Peterborough from March to September 1947.

== Patent Office career ==
In September 1947, Pedrick joined the United Kingdom Patent Office, then based in Southampton Buildings, London, as an associate patent examiner. After World War II, there was a shortage of examiners and a significant backlog had developed. Pedrick was assigned to deal with patent applications in the field of brakes. He later worked his way through the ranks to Examiner and then Senior Examiner.

Pedrick was dismissed from the Patent Office in 1961 on the grounds of inefficiency. However, he wrote in correspondence with his old school, Sutton Valence School:

I worked in the Patent Office for about 14 years until I had a nervous breakdown and got kicked out. It was a crazy Civil Service “farce” of a job, but now I am forever filing patent specifications, which I can never get anyone to do anything about.

== Life after the Patent Office ==
For a short while after leaving the Patent Office, Pedrick worked as a printing machine operator for Britax in Chichester.

He moved into his aunt Alice Winifred's house in Hillfield road in Selsey, Sussex, England, along with his mother and a further aunt Elsie. He lived there until his death

== Pedrick's patent applications ==
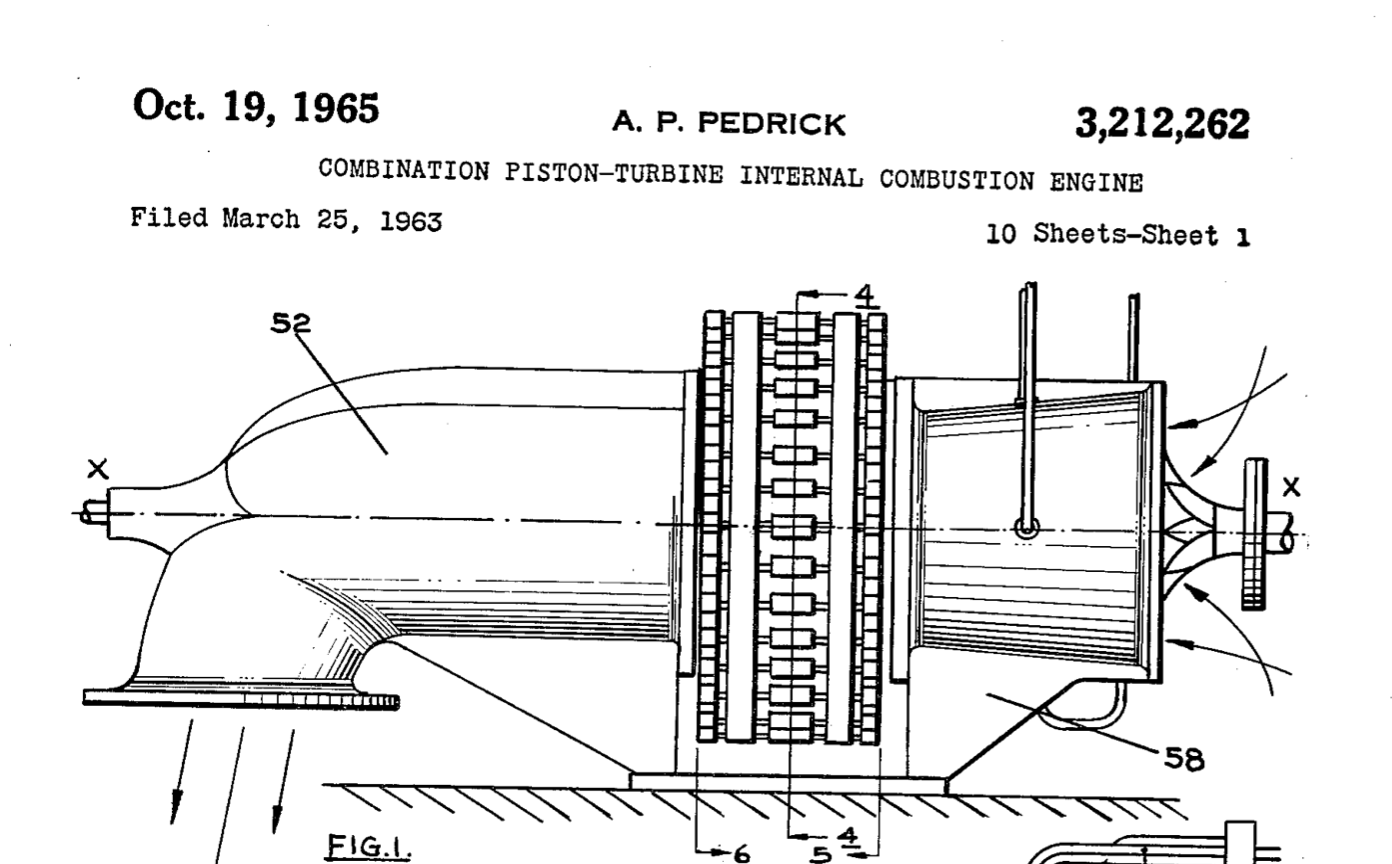
Pedrick's US Patent No 3212262

Pedrick started filing patent applications in mid 1961. His initial patent applications were relatively technical in character, such as his sole US patent, US 3212262. His interests included ball bearings, hovercraft, and safety devices for vehicles. However, one of his main areas of interest was nuclear physics and energy, in which he had no formal training, although he did become a member of the Institution of Nuclear Engineers in 1963.

In March 1964, the contents of Pedrick's patent applications became more unusual, discussing themes such as food banks, world population, increasing traffic and so on. He used his applications to comment upon current affairs. Often, his patents were relevant to current events, such as a rotating tower in GB 1153249 filed around the time the Telecom Tower opened; vehicles with motors in the wheels in GB 1215611 around the time of the Apollo program, and a curtain for high rise building to help extinguish fire in GB 1453920 about the time that The Towering Inferno was released in the UK. The curtain application was Pedrick's last.

From March 1973 onwards, Pedrick's residence would often be listed as "One-Man Photo-Electric Research Laboratories", or "One Man Think Tank Nuclear Fusion Research Laboratories", and so forth. These laboratories were staffed by himself and a ginger-coloured cat sometimes referred to as "Ginger", although it is not clear whether this was actually its name. Ginger was apparently of great help to Pedrick in developing his inventions.

== Selected inventions ==
=== Cat flap and automatic reprisal satellite ===
An application titled "Photon Push-Pull Radiation Detector For Use in Chromatically Selective Cat Flap Control And 1000 Megaton Earth-Orbital Peace-Keeping Bomb".

Pedrick described a novel detector sensitive to electromagnetic energy. The patent application's three claims sought protection both on the detector itself and on two specific devices in which such a detector could be used.

- In the first, the detector forms part of a "chromatically selective cat flap control unit" intended to automatically allow the passage of a cat of one fur colouration, for example ginger, through an access hole in a kitchen door, but to exclude a cat with black fur. Pedrick explains that he came up with this idea because a black cat named Blackie from next door kept trying to steal Ginger's food.
- In the second, the detector forms part of an "automatic reprisal satellite, including a 1000 Megaton 'CND' Bomb". If the detector detects a nuclear rocket attack, it automatically directs the 'CND' bomb to fall on that part of the Earth's surface from which the attack originated.

=== Transfer of fresh water ===
An application titled "Arrangements for the transfer of fresh water from one location on the earth's surface to another at a different latitude, for the purpose of irrigation, with pumping energy derived from the effect of the earth's rotation about the polar axis".

Pedrick describes in extreme detail, with pages of mathematical equations, how snow and ice could be passed along pipelines from the Antarctic to irrigate the dry Australian outback, creating a "granary of the East" that could feed the burgeoning population of the world. Since the flow of water from one region to the other through such pipelines would not be practicable according to Pedrick, his suggestion is to instead compress snow into hard balls that could be fired along these pipelines as projectiles.

=== Extinguishing fires in high rise block buildings ===
An "apparatus for extinguishing fires in high rise block buildings of uniform transverse cross-section or plan".

Pedrick suggests that fire curtains could be secured at the roof level of a high-rise building. When released, they would substantially envelop the entire building. The curtains could be provided with openings that, upon release, were positioned directly across from safe assembly rooms. A concern, however, was that such large curtains could have prevented escape from the building as well as increased the risk of suffocation. This application was Pedrick's last.

== Response ==
"Funny" patents like those written by Pedrick, as well as their popularisation in the media, upset many patent examiners, who often feel they tend to trivialise the subject.

== Patents ==
A selection from over 160 patents filed between 1962 and 1975:

- GB 1453920, "APPARATUS FOR EXTINGUISHING FIRES IN HIGH RISE BLOCK BUILDINGS OF UNIFORM TRANSVERSE CROSS-SECTION OR PLAN", issued 27 October 1976
- GB 1439297, "Initiating A Controlled Fusion Reaction Using Deuterium And Tritium Pellets In Imploding Bullets Fed With Powerful Laser Beam Pulses", issued 14 October 1976
- GB 1421240, "MORTARLESS BRICK WORK TO REDUCE HOUSE BUILDING COSTS", issued 14 October 1976
- GB 1415487, "REDUCING THE TENDENCY OF A GOLF BALL TO SLICE OR HOOK BY ELECTROSTATIC FORCES", issued 14 October 1975
- GB 1391569, "MINIATURE-IMAGE PRODUCING SPECTACLES AND BINOCULARS", issued 14 October 1975
- GB 1388517, "ELECTRICALLY OPERATED INDEX AND COMPARISON SYSTEM", issued 14 October 1975
- GB 1361962, "EARTH ORBITAL BOMBS AS NUCLEAR DETERENTS", issued 14 October 1974
- GB 1351926, "Tea Strainers", issued 14 October 1974
- GB 1348477, "COLOUR TELEVISION USING LIGHTRAY CREATED IMAGES", issued 14 October 1974
- GB 1340664, "VARIABLE SPEED MAGNETIC MOTOR WITH MINIMAL SERVICING OR MAINTENANCE REQUIREMENTS", issued 14 October 1973
- GB 1339414, "EXPLODING BOMBS TO CREATE UNDERGROUND SHELTERS", issued 14 October 1973
- GB 1334640, "SPEED OF LIGHT REGULATED CLOCK", issued 14 October 1973
- GB 1334503, "COLOURED LIGHT RAY SCANNING SYSTEM FOR NTSC PAL COLOUR TV TRANSMISSIONS", issued 14 October 1973
- GB 1333548, "INTERNALLY EXPLOSIVE NAIL", issued 14 October 1973
- GB 1333194, "Electrical Comparison Systems", issued 14 October 1973
- GB 1332079, "ELECTROMAGNETICALLY OPERATED TUBULAR PUMP", issued 14 October 1973
- GB 1331862, "ARRANGEMENTS FOR ESTABLISHING A PIPE LINE ACROSS DEEP SNOW SUBJECT TO FREQUENT FRESH SNOW FALLS IN A MANNER SUCH THAT THE PIPE LINE WILL BE RETAINED ON THE SURFACE OF THE SNOW LAYER", issued 1973
- GB 1251780, "Golf tee", issued 1971

== Further readings ==
- The prolific Arthur Pedrick – IP Review
- A patently absurd invention? – BBC story
- Crazy creations of infamous inventor – The Argus
- Anthony, Dan (20 November 2017). "Patent Pedrick: The story of Arthur and Ginger". Intellectual Property Office blog.
- Stevnsborg, Niels (1 December 2011). "Arthur Paul Pedrick – The man behind the patents". World Patent Information. 33 (4): 371–382. doi:10.1016/j.wpi.2011.07.004. ISSN 0172-2190.
