= Ralf Sieckmann v Deutsches Patent und Markenamt =

- European Court of Justice

Submitted 10 July 2000 Decided 12 December 2002
- Full case name: Ralf Sieckmann v Deutsches Patent- und Markenamt
- Case: C-273/00
- CelexID: 62000CJ0273
- ECLI: ECLI:EU:C:2002:748
- Case type: Reference for a preliminary ruling
- Chamber: Full court
- Nationality of parties: Germany
- Procedural history: Bundespatentgericht, Preliminary reference of 14 April 2000 (33 W (pat) 193/99)

Ruling
- 1. Article 2 of Council Directive 89/104/EEC of 21 December 1988 to approximate the laws of the Member States relating to trade marks must be interpreted as meaning that a trade mark may consist of a sign which is not in itself capable of being perceived visually, provided that it can be represented graphically, particularly by means of images, lines or characters, and that the representation is clear, precise, self-contained, easily accessible, intelligible, durable and objective.; 2. In respect of an olfactory sign, the requirements of graphic representability are not satisfied by a chemical formula, by a description in written words, by the deposit of an odour sample or by a combination of those elements.

Court composition
- Judge-Rapporteur; Fidelma O’Kelly Macken
- Advocate General; Dámaso Ruiz-Jarabo Colomer

Legislation affecting
- Interprets Directive 89/104/EEC

In trademark law, Sieckmann v German Patent and Trademark Office (case C-273/00) issued on December 12, 2002, is widely recognised as a landmark decision of the European Court of Justice on the graphical representation of non-conventional trademarks under the European Trade Marks Directive.

The case involved a "methyl cinnamate" scent, which the applicant had described "as balsamically fruity with a slight hint of cinnamon". The ECJ ruled that (a) a chemical formula depicting this scent did not represent the odour of a substance, was not sufficiently intelligible, nor sufficiently clear and precise; (b) a written description was not sufficiently clear, precise and objective; and (c) a physical deposit of a sample of the scent did not constitute a graphic representation, and was not sufficiently stable or durable.

The case illustrates difficulties with the graphical representation of scent marks, as the ECJ held that these representations, whether individually or collectively, could not satisfy this requirement.
