= Trademark Official Gazette =

Official publication of trademarks in the United States

The Trademark Official Gazette (TMOG) is a weekly publication of the United States Patent and Trademark Office (USPTO) which publishes newly registered trademarks. Once a trademark application has been examined by a USPTO examining attorney and found to be entitled to registration, it is published in the Official Gazette of the USPTO.

== Overview ==
The Official Gazette provides anyone who believes they would be damaged by the registration of a published mark with an opportunity to challenge the proposed registration. Upon its publication, anyone who believes that the registering party's use of the mark might damage him or her has 30 days in which to file an opposition to the registration. If such an opposition is made, the registering party will be informed and then must fight it or abandon the trademark. If no oppositions are filed, or if any opposition is successfully overcome, the application will proceed to registration.

== Version ==
On September 24, 2013, a new web-based version of the Trademark Official Gazette was made available to the general public; the last paper edition of the Trademark Official Gazette, published by the Government Printing Office, was the December 25, 2012 edition.

== See also ==
- United States Patent and Trademark Office
- List of intellectual property law journals
- Patent Office Professional Association (POPA)
- Trademark Trial and Appeal Board (TTAB)
- Trademark Manual of Examining Procedure (TMEP)
