= Electronic System for Trademark Trials and Appeals =

The Electronic System for Trademark Trials and Appeals (ESTTA) is the electronic filing system for legal proceedings at the United States Trademark Trial and Appeal Board. ESTTA provides forms for routine filings like consent motions and requests for an extension of time to oppose a mark. Parties can also upload digital copies of various types of pleadings and motions.

When the United States Department of Commerce changed its mailing address in 2004, it encouraged and promoted the use of the ESTTA. As of 2010, Extensions for appeals under the Madrid Protocol use the ESTTA "online communication system", and both those and "Notices of Opposition ... can only be filed using the USPTO online Electronic System for Trademark Trials and Appeals." (Emphasis in original.)
