= Smell rights =

Ownership of a scent

Smell rights are claims of ownership to particular smells. These rights can include copyright or non-conventional trademark.

== Protection and trends ==
In France, the scent of a perfume is not eligible for copyright.

In 2006, a Dutch court ruled that a perfume could have a copyright. The case was a claim of French cosmetics company, Lancôme, on the property of the scent of its perfume Trésor against the version of such fragance done by the Dutch firm Kecofa. The Dutch High court granted the protection given that scent as long as it is perceptible and original.

Legal commentators have described possible systems for trademarking scents. WIPO has collected information on the use of registration of the such called "Olfactory marks" as a tendency among national offices of trademark.

In the United States, Hasbro has a trademark for the smell of Play-Doh.

In November 2025, India approved its first registration of a smell mark for a scent described as “Floral fragrance / smell reminiscent of roses as applied to tires”. The application was filed by the Japanese company Sumitomo Rubber Industries, which had already registered the same smell mark in the UK in 1996 but not in India because the country requires a graphical representation for any type of mark. Sumitomo Rubber Industries met this requirement by using a seven-dimensional mathematical vector representation prepared by the Indian Institute of Information Technology Allahabad, which mapped the scent across seven fundamental olfactory dimensions: floral, fruity, woody, nutty, pungent, sweet, and minty. This becomes the first case of a graphical representation of a smell accepted for registering it as trademark.
