= Patent Office Professional Association =

American labor union

- Abbreviation: POPA
- Founded: 1964
- Type: Labor union
- Headquarters: Alexandria, Virginia
- Location: United States
- Members: 2630 (2025)
- Website: POPA.org

The Patent Office Professional Association (POPA) is a professional union of United States patent examiners. It was formed in 1964.

POPA represents all patent office professionals at the US Patent and Trademark Office including:

- Patent Attorneys at the Board of Patent Appeals and Interferences (BPAI)
- Non-supervisory attorneys and Congressional Affairs Specialists in the Office of External Affairs (OEA)
- Petitions attorneys in the Office of Petitions
- Review Quality Assurance Specialists (rQAS) in the Office of Patent Quality Assurance (OPQA)
- Designated Training Quality Assurance Specialists (tQAS)
- Non-supervisory patent examiners and primary examiners
- Non-supervisory Patent Reexamination Specialists in the Central Reexamination Unit (CRU)
- Patent Cooperation Treaty (PCT) examiners and attorney advisors
- Certain librarians and accountants

== See also ==
- United States Patent and Trademark Office (USPTO)
