= Non-conventional trademark =

A non-conventional trademark, also known as a nontraditional trademark, is any new type of trademark which does not belong to a pre-existing, conventional category of trade mark, and which is often difficult to register, but which may nevertheless fulfill the essential trademark function of uniquely identifying the commercial origin of products or services.

The term is broadly inclusive as it encompasses marks which do not fall into the conventional set of marks (e.g. those consisting of letters, numerals, words, logos, pictures, symbols, or combinations of one or more of these elements), and therefore includes marks based on appearance, shape, sound, smell, taste and texture.

Non-conventional trademarks may therefore be visible signs (e.g. colors, shapes, moving images, holograms, positions), or non-visible signs (e.g. sounds, scents, tastes, textures).

== Trends and issues ==
Certain types of non-conventional trademarks have become more widely accepted in recent times as a result of legislative changes expanding the definition of "trademark". Such developments are the result of international treaties dealing with intellectual property, such as the Agreement on Trade-Related Aspects of Intellectual Property Rights, which sets down a standardised, inclusive legal definition. Single colour trademarks, motion trademarks, hologram trademarks, shape trademarks (also known as three-dimensional trademarks or 3D trademarks), and sound trademarks (also known as aural trademarks), are examples of such marks.

=== Colour trademarks ===
In the United Kingdom, colours have been granted trademark protection when used in specific, limited contexts such as packaging or marketing. The particular shade of turquoise used on cans of Heinz baked beans can only be used by the H. J. Heinz Company for that product. In another instance, BP claims the right to use green on signs for petrol stations. In a widely disputed move, Cadbury's (confectioners) has been granted "the colour Purple".

In the United States, it is possible, in some cases, for color alone to function as a trademark. Originally, color was considered not a valid feature to register a trademark Leshen & Sons Rope Co. v. Broderick & Bascom Rope Co., 201 U.S. 166 (1906). Later, with the passage of the Lanham Act the United States Supreme Court in the case of Qualitex Co. v. Jacobson Products Co., 514 U.S. 159, 165, 115 S.Ct. 1300, 1304, 131 L.Ed.2d 248 (1995) would rule that under the Lanham Act, subject to the usual conditions, a color is registrable as a trademark.

The right to exclusive use of a specific color as a trademark on packaging has generally been mixed in U.S. court cases. Specific cases denying color protection include royal blue for ice cream packages (AmBrit Inc. v. Kraft, Inc., 812 F.2d 1531 (11th Cir. 1986), cert. denied, 481 U.S. 1041 (1987)); a series of stripes or multiple colors on candy packages (Life Savers v. Curtiss Candy Co., 82 F.2d 4 (7th Cir. 1950)); green for farm implements (Deere & Co. v. Farmhand Inc. (560 F. Supp. 85 (S.D. Iowa 1982) aff'd, 721 F.2d 253 (8th Cir. 1983)); black for motors (Brunswick Corp. v. British Seagull, Ltd., 35 F.3d 1527 (Fed. Cir.), cert. denied, 115 S. Ct. 1426 (1994)); and the use of red for one half of a soup can (Campbell Soup Co. v. Armour & Co., 175 F. 2d 795 (Court of App. 3d Cir., 1949)). A successful case granting color protection involved the use of the color red for cans of tile mastic Dap Products, Inc. v. Color Tile Mfg., Inc. 821 F. Supp. 488 (S.D. Ohio 1993), and a green-gold color for dry cleaning pads (Qualitex Co. v. Jacobson Products Co., 514 U.S. 159, 165, 115 S.Ct. 1300, 1304, 131 L.Ed.2d 248 (1995)).

=== Smell trademarks ===
Although scent trademarks (also known as olfactory trademarks or smell trademarks), are sometimes specifically mentioned in legislative definitions of "trademark", it is often difficult to register such marks if consistent, non-arbitrary and meaningful graphic representations of the marks cannot be produced. This tends to be an issue with all types of non-conventional trademarks, especially in Europe. United States practice is generally more liberal; a trademark for plumeria scent for sewing thread was registered in 1990. In Europe, a written description, with or without a deposited sample, is not sufficient to allow the mark to be registered, whereas such formalities are acceptable in the United States. However, even in the United States "functional" scents that are inherent in the product itself, such as smell for perfume, are not accepted for registration.

In November 2025, India approved its first registration of a smell mark for a scent described as “Floral fragrance / smell reminiscent of roses as applied to tires”. The application was filed by the Japanese company Sumitomo Rubber Industries, which had already registered the same smell mark in the UK in 1996 but not in India because the country requires a graphical representation for any type of mark. Sumitomo Rubber Industries met this requirement by using a seven-dimensional mathematical vector representation prepared by the Indian Institute of Information Technology Allahabad, which mapped the scent across seven fundamental olfactory dimensions: floral, fruity, woody, nutty, pungent, sweet, and minty.

=== Shape trademarks ===
One example of a shape trademark recognized in Europe is the protection granted to Toblerone, a company which manufactures chocolate bars with a distinctive triangular shape.

=== Other non-conventional trademarks ===
Presenting further difficulties are entirely new types of marks which, despite growing commercial adoption in the marketplace, are typically very difficult to register, often because they are not formally recognised as a "trademark". Examples of such marks are motion trademarks (also known as animated marks, moving marks, moving image marks or movement marks). Many web browsers feature a moving image mark in the top right hand corner of the browser screen which is visible when the browser is in the process of resolving a website.

== Decisions on non-conventional trademarks ==
=== Owens-Corning ===
Owens-Corning was issued a trademark for the color pink used to color its fiberglass batting insulation product. The decision was based upon the fact that the company had been emphasizing the pink color of its insulation for decades, had licensed use of the Pink Panther cartoon character in its ads, the color was a non-functional aspect of the product (fiberglass is normally tan or yellow), and Owens Corning had spent over US$50 million advertising its insulation product. In re Owens-Corning Fiberglas Corp., 774 F.2d 1116 (Fed. Cir. 1985).

=== Sieckmann ===
In Dr. Ralf Sieckmann vs Deutsches Patent- und Markenamt (case C-273/00), a judgement of the European Court of Justice issued on December 12, 2002, the ECJ held in relation to trademarks in the European Community that:

- Article 2 of Council Directive 89/104/EEC (of 21 December 1988 to approximate the laws of the Member States relating to trade marks) must be interpreted as meaning that a trade mark may consist of a sign which is not in itself capable of being perceived visually, provided that it can be represented graphically, particularly by means of images, lines or characters, and that the representation is clear, precise, self-contained, easily accessible, intelligible, durable and objective.
- In respect of an olfactory sign, the requirements of graphic representability are not satisfied by a chemical formula, by a description in written words, by the deposit of an odour sample or by a combination of those elements.

== See also ==
- Intellectual property
