= Acceptable Identification of Goods and Services Manual =

The Acceptable Identification of Goods and Services Manual is a directory maintained by the United States Patent and Trademark Office (USPTO) outlining the different categories of goods and services recognized by that office with respect to trademark registrations, and setting forth the forty-two international classes into which those goods and services are divided.

The USPTO separates goods and services into various classes, which are governed by international treaties. In order for an applicant to receive a trademark registration, that applicant must describe the goods and/or services to which the mark applies, and must identify the classes into which those goods and/or services fall. If the description is vague or does not match the content permitted in the classes claimed, then the application may be rejected until the applicant provides an acceptable description. By using the language set forth in the Manual, the applicant can be certain that the application will not be rejected on such a basis. The manual is available on the USPTO website, where it is searchable by keyword.

While the European Union also maintains such a list of goods and services, the list maintained by the United States "is much more extensive and detailed in comparison".
