= International Trademark Association =

Global trademark and intellectual property association

International Trademark Association (INTA)
- Type: Nonprofit organization Advocacy group
- Website: www.inta.org

The International Trademark Association is concerned with protecting trademarks and complementary intellectual property via advocacy work and offering educational programs and legal resources.

The association's nearly 6,500 member organizations from 165 countries represent more than 34,000 trademark professionals and include brand owners from major corporations as well as small and medium-sized enterprises, law firms, and nonprofits.

== History ==
INTA was originally known as the United States Trademark Association (USTA), which was established in 1878 in New York City by 17 merchants and manufacturers to protect and promote the rights of trademark owners, secure useful legislation, and give aid and encouragement to all efforts for the advancement and observance of trademark rights.

In 1908, the association became a business corporation under the Business Corporation Law of the State of New York, and it was given broad powers to act for the protection of trademarks in the United States and around the world.

In 1926, the USTA became a not-for-profit member organization.

In 1993, the association changed its name to the International Trademark Association.

== Activities ==
INTA provides services to its members and the public in three main areas: global trademark resources, programs & events, and policy & advocacy.

INTA produces digital publications, including the INTA Bulletin and The Trademark Reporter, and multijurisdictional Practice Guides, such as Country Guides, covering various topics and jurisdictions worldwide. Some resources (focusing on the basics of trademark law) are available to the general public, others (on legal practice in jurisdictions worldwide) are exclusively available to members.

The Trademark Reporter is a bi-monthly peer-reviewed scholarly journal that explores all aspects of trademark law, and the INTA Bulletin is INTA's weekly newsletter delivering news about association activities, and developments and trends in global trademark law.

INTA hosts meetings, conferences, roundtables, and webcasts that bring international trademark professionals together to discuss trademark issues, and IP law and practice. These events are open to members and non-members. It also hosts a bi-monthly podcast, Brand & New, with host Audrey Dauvet.

INTA's largest event is the annual meeting, which dates back to 1878. The meeting takes place every spring—usually in May—and attracts more than 10,000 participants from around the globe and consists of five days of networking and business development opportunities, educational and professional development opportunities, as well as committee meetings and exhibits. The 2027 Annual Meeting will take place May 8-12 in San Diego, California, at the San Diego Convention Center.

INTA works to promote effective trademark laws and policies worldwide. INTA carries out its policy and advocacy work through model laws and guidelines, board of directors resolutions, amicus briefs, testimony and submissions, and reports.

The committees of INTA's Advocacy Group are:

- Anticounterfeiting
- Brands and Innovation
- Copyright
- Data Protection
- Designs
- Emerging Issues
- Enforcement
- Famous & Well-Known Marks
- Geographical Indications
- Harmonization of Trademark Law & Practice
- Indigenous Rights
- International Amicus
- Internet
- Legislation & Regulation
- Non-Traditional Marks
- Parallel Imports
- Right of Publicity
- Trademark Office Practices
- Unfair Competition

== Structure ==
INTA is led by a board of directors composed of up to 37 representatives of member organizations. The board elects several officers and works with the CEO and staff, along with the member volunteers who serve on committees to implement the association's strategic plan. Deborah A. Hampton (Chemours, Wilmington, Delaware, USA) is the INTA 2026 President. The board appoints committees that conduct the work of the association. Any individual who works for a member organization is eligible to apply for committee membership.

== Membership ==
INTA members include nearly 6,500 organizations from 185 countries. The association's member organizations represent more than 34,000 trademark professionals working at:

- major corporations;
- small- and medium-sized enterprises;
- law firms, service firms and sole practitioners;
- nonprofits;
- government offices; and
- academic institutions.

== Locations ==
The association has headquarters in New York City, offices in Brussels, Beijing, Santiago, Chile, Singapore, and Washington, D.C., and a representative in New Delhi.

In 2003, INTA opened its China Representative Office in Shanghai, its the first office outside the United States. The Office moved to Beijing in 2021.

In 2006, INTA opened its Europe Representative Office in Brussels, Belgium.

In 2007, INTA opened a representative office in Washington, DC.

In 2016, INTA opened its Asia Pacific Representative Office in Singapore.

In 2017, INTA opened its Latin American and Caribbean Representative Office in Santiago, Chile.

== See also ==
- Trademarks
- Brands
- Intellectual Property
- Trade Association
- Intellectual property organization
- Trademark attorney
