= Société des Produits Nestlé S.A. v Cadbury UK Limited =

2012 UK trademark case

Société des Produits Nestlé S.A. v Cadbury UK Limited is a trademark law case decision by the High Court of Justice, Court of Chancery, in the United Kingdom. The Court held that a specific shade of the colour purple (Pantone 2685C) was registrable as a trademark for the following goods: milk chocolate in bar and tablet form; milk chocolate for eating; drinking chocolate; preparations for making drinking chocolate.

However the ruling was overturned by a court of appeal in October 2014.

== Background ==
Cadbury had applied trademark registration for the colour purple (Pantone 2685C) based on filed evidence of distinctiveness acquired through use of the mark; the application was accepted and published on 30 May 2008. Nestlé opposed the application arguing that the mark was not capable of being represented graphically and as such is not registrable as a trademark. Nestlé also argued that the description of goods was too broad.

== Decision ==
The Court stated that Sections 1(1)(a) and 3(1) of the Trade Marks Act 1994 Trade Marks Act 1994 were intended to implement Articles 2 and 3 of the Trade Mark Directive Trade Marks Directive which also correspond to Art. 4 and 7 of the Community Trade Mark Regulation. Therefore, the Court relied on a series of judgments from the Court of Justice of the European Union (CJEU).

The judge concluded ultimately in Cadbury's favour:

Since single colours per se are, as a matter of European law, capable of being signs within Art. 2 ... then, to paraphrase a little the words Cadbury have used in the description of the mark, in my judgment the colour purple (Pantone 2685C) applied to the whole visible surface, or being the predominant colour applied to the whole visible surface, of the packaging of chocolate, is capable of being a sign within Art. 2. [...]

Since on the evidence the public associate the colour purple itself with Cadbury's chocolate, Cadbury are entitled to a registered trade mark for that colour on the relevant goods and that is the mark they have applied for.
