= Trademark examiner =

A trademark examiner is an attorney employed by a government entity such as the United States Patent and Trademark Office (USPTO) to determine whether an applicant should be permitted to receive a trademark registration, thus affording legal protection to the applicant's trademark. The job of a trademark examiner is thus to examine marks applied for to determine if they run afoul of any prohibitions on registration, such as infringing upon an existing registration of the same mark, or constituting the generic name of the goods with which the mark is associated.

== In the United States ==
The USPTO employs several hundred trademark examiners at any given time, although the number fluctuates with the strength of the economy, which influences how many new trademark filings are being submitted. These employees are evaluated by a point system, based on the number of applications that they address and dispose of, either by permitting them to go forward to registration, or denying registration in an office action, and seeing this denial through any appeals taken within the USPTO. Some USPTO trademark examiners work in the USPTO building in Alexandria, Virginia, but a majority telework full-time.

In 2011, proposed budget cuts of $100 million to the U.S. Patent and Trademark Office budget of slightly over $2 billion were reported to not have any impact on the size of the Trademark staff. However, all hiring in 2011 at the USPTO was frozen.

== In Turkey ==
The TPI (Turkish Patent Institute) employs more than hundred trademark examiners at any given time. All TPI trademark examiners work in the TPE building in Ankara, Turkey.

At first, an examiner starts to work as an assistant for three years. After 2 years TPE wants from him to prepare a thesis about any subject of trademark. He studies on thesis nearly 10 months. After that he presents it to the board of directors. If thesis accepted by the Board, examiner will enter an exam about the thesis. If everything goes on its way, assistant examiner is going to leave the assistance label and will become a trademark examiner.

== In China ==
According to guidance published by the China National Intellectual Property Administration (CNIPA), a trademark examiner on site at a local IP registration office is made available to provide immediate preliminary review of applications. Subsequently, a main office trademark examiner will inspect the application to see if it has been classified according to the Nice Classification system, and incorrectly filled applications will be sent back with an opportunity to correct. Substantive examination will look closely for the proposed trademark's possible conflict with priority rights, such as existing unregistered marks or similarity to an existing trademark.

== See also ==
- Trademark attorney
- Patent examiner
