= Trademark attorney =

Person qualified to act on trademark matters

A trademark attorney (U.S. spelling) or trade mark attorney or agent (UK spelling) is a person who is qualified to act in matters involving trademark law and practice and provide legal advice on trade mark and design matters.

In many countries, most notably the United Kingdom, trade mark attorneys are a separate recognized legal profession, along with solicitors and barristers, and are recognized as lawyers under the Legal Services Act 2007. In other jurisdictions, such as the United States, the profession is less clearly defined, with trademark attorneys being part of the general legal profession. In other words, they are attorneys at law who specialize in trade mark matters. In many countries, trademark attorneys have rights of audience before intellectual property courts, and benefit from attorney–client privilege. Unless they are also members of the general legal profession, as they are in the United States, their right to appear in Court is usually limited to trademark matters.

A trademark attorney frequently begins his or her career by joining a firm of trademark attorneys, or a firm of Intellectual Property attorneys with departments specializing in patent law, trademark law, and copyright law. Increasingly however, large multi-discipline law firms are establishing trademark practices. Trademark attorneys are also employed by large companies which have enough trademark interests to need an attorney just to deal with their own matters.

The responsibilities of a trademark attorney include advising on the adoption and selection of new trademarks; filing and prosecuting applications to register trademarks; advising on the use and registration of trademarks; handling trademark oppositions, revocations, invalidations and assignments; carry out searches; and advising on trademark infringement matters.

Trademark attorneys are often regulated as a profession, in which case they must pass a series of examinations, comply with other requirements, and observe professional ethics and standards in order to maintain formal registration (under the Copyright, Designs and Patents Act 1988 and Trade Marks Act 1994 in the UK, for instance).

This is typically the position in Commonwealth jurisdictions such as Australia, New Zealand and the United Kingdom, where only qualified individuals may hold themselves out as being trade mark attorneys. In such cases the qualification is known as an exclusive or protected title. The minimum educational requirements to enter the profession in such cases are GCSE A, B or C grade in five approved subjects, and GCE 'A' level in two approved subjects, or their equivalents. Candidates with certain degrees, such as law, may be eligible for exemption in some Foundation Papers of the qualifying examination (and will usually find it easier to find a job as a trainee).

Some American legal scholars have criticized the attorney requirement, finding “attorney representation makes a significant difference for some types of applications and under certain circumstances, the impact is not uniform.” Some legal systems have robust trademark representation where attorney representation is not required except in courts.

For example, in China, the trademark regulations provide that such services may be provided by a trademark service provider it licenses, and that trademark agents do not need to be attorneys to file for trademarks or bring disputes before the Trademark Office. Licensing occurs at the organizational level; agents cannot practice independently.

There is no exclusive title in other jurisdictions such as the United States, where no specialized examinations are required in order to qualify and practice as a trademark attorney. In the United States, any attorney who is licensed to practice law in any state can represent individuals and companies in trademark matters before the United States Patent and Trademark Office (USPTO). This stems from the view that an attorney is capable of practicing law in any field with a minimum level of competence as shown by passing a state bar exam.

In the United States, any attorney who is licensed to practice law in any state can represent individuals and companies in the United States Trademark Office. Many trademark attorneys have undergraduate degrees in a variety of fields such as business administration, marketing, liberal arts rather than in the science or engineering field which a Patent Attorney must have in order to practice in the United States Patent Office. Furthermore, a patent attorney must pass a special exam in order to represent individuals and companies in the Patent Office while a trademark attorney does not.

In addition, the examiners who review all trademark applications filed with the Trademark Office are also licensed attorneys and their official title is Trademark Examining Attorney. They also do a trademark search of the federal trademark records to determine if the trademark applied for is confusingly similar to a registered or a prior pending application.

== See also ==
- International Trademark Association (INTA)
- Patent attorney
- Trademark examiner
