= Trademark Trial and Appeal Board =

The Trademark Trial and Appeal Board (TTAB) is an administrative tribunal within the United States Patent and Trademark Office (USPTO) established in 1958. The TTAB is empowered to determine the right to register a trademark. It has no authority to determine the right to use one, nor broader questions of infringement, unfair competition, damages or injunctive relief. The TTAB decides ex parte appeals from decisions by USPTO Examiners denying registration of marks, and inter partes proceedings challenging the registration of marks. Decisions of the TTAB may be appealed to a United States district court, or to the United States Court of Appeals for the Federal Circuit.

Practices and procedures for litigating before the TTAB are governed by the Trademark Rules of Practice and the Federal Rules of Civil Procedure. The Trademark Trial and Appeal Board Manual of Procedure (TBMP) is an important guide to practice before the TTAB.

== Judges of the TTAB ==
The Administrative Trademark Judges of the Trademark Trial and Appeal Board (TTAB) are appointed by the United States Secretary of Commerce in consultation with the Under Secretary of Commerce for Intellectual Property. Each appeal and adversarial proceeding is heard and decided by at least three judges of the TTAB. There are currently twenty judges sitting at the TTAB (as of October 2026), as follows:

Judge	Appointed	Prior professional experience	Education
Christina J. Hieber (Acting Chief Administrative Trademark Judge)	2025	Senior Counsel for Trademark Policy and Litigation, USPTO Office of the Solicitor; Private Practice (Washington, DC)	B.A., Dartmouth College; J.D., George Washington University Law School
Melanye K. Johnson (Deputy Chief Administrative Trademark Judge)	2020	Private Practice (Detroit, MI; Washington, DC); Corporate Counsel; Senior Counsel, Office of General Counsel at the U.S. Department of Health and Human Services (HHS)	B.A., University of Michigan; J.D., Ohio State University Moritz College of Law
Martha B. Allard	2021	Private Practice (Nashville, TN)	B.S., University of Kentucky; J.D. cum laude, Western New England University School of Law
Jessica D. Bradley	2024	Private Practice; LexisNexis	B.A. summa cum laude, George Washington University;J.D. cum laude, Catholic University of America Columbus School of Law
Elizabeth K. Brock	2024	Private Practice (Michigan)	B.A., University of Michigan; J.D., Wayne State University Law School
Thomas L. Casagrande	2023	Law Clerk to Hon. B. Avant Edenfield, Chief U.S. District Judge (S.D. Ga.); Private Practice (Houston, TX; New Haven, CT); Associate Solicitor USPTO	B.A., University of Pennsylvania; J.D. with Honors, University of Connecticut School of Law
Wendy B. Cohen	2023	Private Practice; TTAB Interlocutory Attorney	B.A., University of Missouri - Columbia; J.D., University of Missouri School of Law
Jennifer L. Elgin	2023	Private Practice; Corporate Counsel; TTAB Interlocutory Attorney	B.S., Cornell University; J.D., Emory University School of Law
Christen M. English	2019	Private Practice; TTAB Interlocutory Attorney	B.A., Boston College; J.D., Columbus School of Law
Cheryl S. Goodman	2014	Trademark Examining Attorney; TTAB Interlocutory Attorney	B.A., University of Illinois; J.D., Florida State University College of Law
Cindy B. Greenbaum	2012	Private Practice (New York, NY; Washington, DC); Trademark Examining Attorney; TTAB Interlocutory Attorney; TTAB Managing Interlocutory Attorney	B.S., Wharton School, University of Pennsylvania; J.D., New York University School of Law
Christopher C. Larkin	2016	Private Practice (Los Angeles, CA; New York, NY)	B.A., Stanford University; J.D., Columbia University School of Law
Robert J. Lavache	2024	Trademark Legal and Examination Policy Specialist; various other USPTO positions	B.A., University of Miami; J.D., Cornell Law School
Mark Lebow	2020	Private Practice (Alexandria, VA)	B.A., Florida Atlantic University; J.D., Hofstra University School of Law; LL.M. with high honors, John Marshall Law School
Angela Lykos	2010	Trademark Examining Attorney; Trademark Senior Managing Attorney; TTAB Interlocutory Attorney; Editor Trademark Trial and Appeal Board Manual of Procedure (TBMP 2020); Private Practice (Washington, D.C.)	B.A., Johns Hopkins University with General and Departmental Honors; M.A., Johns Hopkins School of Advanced International Studies (SAIS) with Distinction; J.D., Duke University Law School
Catherine Dugan O'Connor	2024	Law clerk to Hon. Denny Chin (SDNY); Private practice	B.A. cum laude, University of Connecticut; J.D. summa cum laude, St. John's University School of Law
George C. Pologeorgis	2015	TTAB Interlocutory Attorney; TTAB Attorney in the Office of Trademark Quality Review and Training; Trademark Examining Attorney; Private Practice	B.A. University of Pennsylvania; J.D., George Washington University National Law Center
Lawrence T. Stanley, Jr.	2024	Private Practice; TTAB Interlocutory Attorney	B.A., Indiana University; J.D. summa cum laude, New England School of Law
Mark A. Thurmon	2019	Private practice; adjunct professor of law, University of Texas School of Law; assistant professor of law, Levin College of Law; professor of law, Southern University Law Center; former Deputy Chief Administrative Trademark Judge	B.S, Louisiana State University; J.D. with high honors, Duke University School of Law
Thomas W. Wellington	2007	TTAB Interlocutory Attorney; Trademark Examining Attorney; Private Practice	B.A., University of Maryland at College Park; J.D., American University Washington College of Law

== See also ==
- Electronic System for Trademark Trials and Appeals
- Trademark Trial and Appeal Board Manual of Procedure
- Trademarks Opposition Board, the equivalent body in Canada
