= Spangles (restaurant) =

American fast food restaurant chain

Spangles Inc.

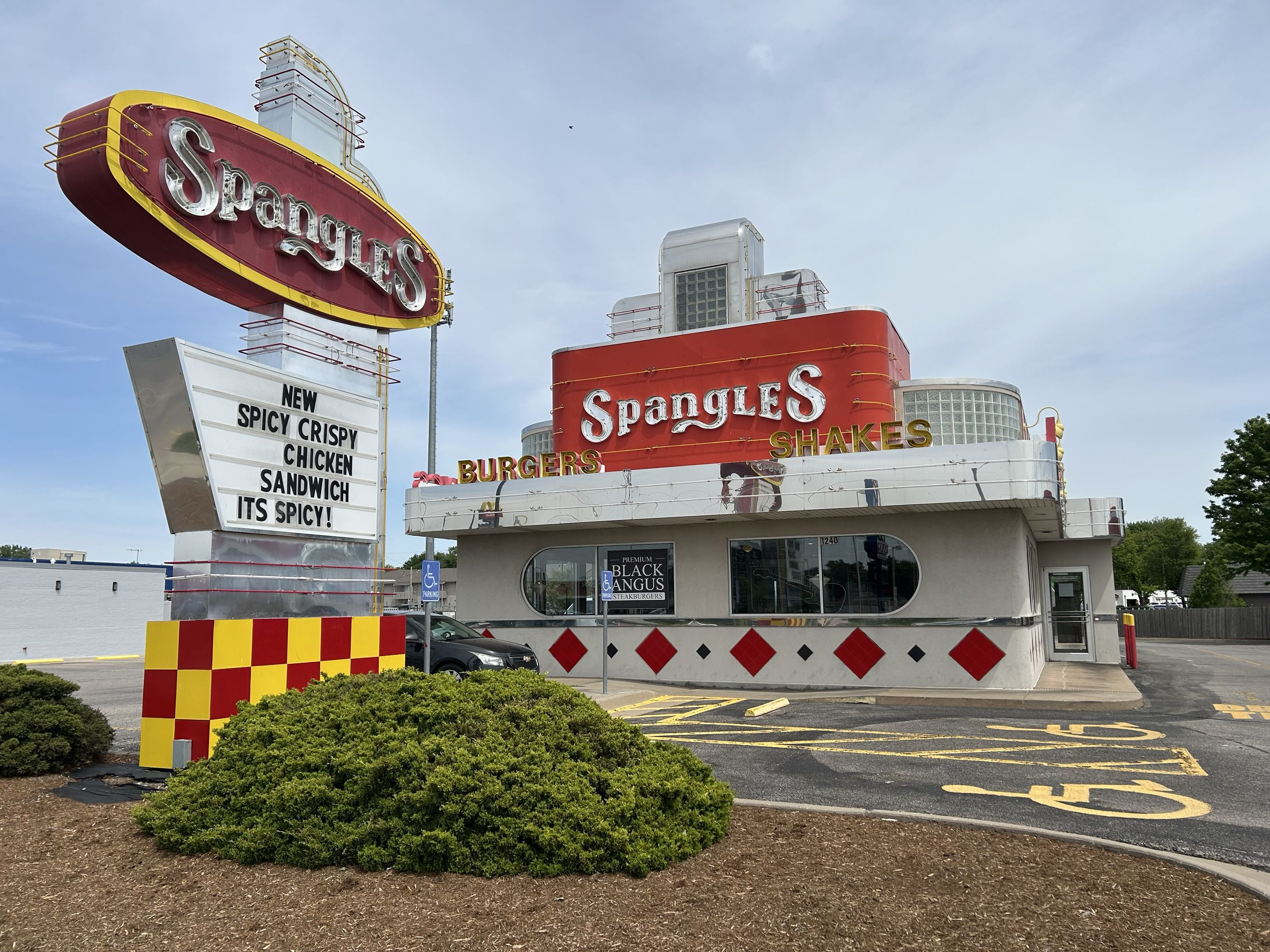
- A Spangles restaurant in Wichita, Kansas (2026)
- Type: Private
- Industry: Restaurants
- Founded: January 1978; 48 years ago
- Founder: Dale and Craig Steven
- Headquarters: 437 North Hillside Street, Wichita, Kansas, US
- Number of locations: 27
- Key people: Rene Steven (director of operations), Dave Dooman (CFO), Craig Steven Jr. (chief corporate adviser), Melissa Hennen (marketing)
- Products: Fast food, including Gourmet Supreme hamburgers, flatbread pita wraps, Western Burgers, and soft serve desserts.
- Revenue: ▲$36 million USD (2021)
- Owner: Hamideh family
- Number of employees: 1,000
- Website: spanglesinc.com

Spangles is a family-owned 1950s themed fast food chain based in Wichita, Kansas. It serves 1/3-pound burgers, flatbread pita wraps, french fries, onion rings, breakfast sandwiches, cinnamon and sugar donuts, lactose-free milkshakes, and an array of other soft-serve desserts. The chain is known for its bizarre, kitschy television commercials.

Today, Spangles Inc. operates 27 locations across Kansas.

== Locations ==
Spangles Inc. has 27 locations across the state of Kansas, with 14 in the Wichita area, 4 in Topeka, 2 in Hutchinson, 2 in Salina, and 1 each in Andover, Derby, El Dorado, Emporia and Park City.

== History ==
=== Founding ===
Spangles began as a restaurant named Coney Island in Wichita, Kansas. Brothers Dale and Craig Steven converted a hot dog restaurant named Wiener King into their own restaurant and opened in January 1978. Business went well at Coney Island, but in 1984 the Steven brothers decided that the name "Coney Island" was too restrictive since it could not be franchised. The company launched a citywide contest which resulted in the name Spangles.

=== Expansion ===
The first Topeka store opening made national news in restaurant trade publications in 2004. "An average unit volume of over $20,000 a week is considered respectable in the industry—$25,000 to $30,000 would be extremely high," Dale Steven said. A typical first week for Spangles in Wichita produces $35,000 in sales, a strong number by industry standards, said Dennis Carpenter, CEO of the Kansas Restaurant & Hospitality Association. In its first week, the Topeka Spangles reached $97,000 in sales; cars were wrapped twice around the building with people outside directing traffic. On April 25, 2006, a store opening in Lawrence, Kansas, attracted 250 people camping in tents who were awaiting the store's 6:30am opening despite a thunderstorm in the area. Campers waited for the grand opening because Spangles offered free food for one year for the first 100 customers (the very first being Andrew Hadel of Overland Park, Kansas). Some campers stayed for as long as 24 hours in improvised forts to protect against the hail. Spangles framed pictures of the first 100 customers in that store and hung them on the wall of the restaurant. Marsha Sheahan, vice president of public relations for the Greater Topeka Chamber of Commerce, said Spangles is filling a niche that is different than the large chains, such as McDonald's, and the slow-paced home style restaurants in the city.

Business for Spangles increased when the restaurant chain doubled its advertising budget to about 4 percent of its revenue. The company runs major advertising campaigns on local radio stations, local television stations, and Cox Cable channels. In addition to the company's slogan, "Spangles, it just tastes better!", the Gourmet Supreme value pack is advertised with the slogan, "$2.99? Are you out of your mind?" In May 2008 the famous $2.99 Gourmet Supreme value pack was raised to $4.99 due to rising costs. The new $2.99 burger is the Classic Burger which was the Gourmet Jr sandwich. The company's advertising firm, digitalBRAND Communications, has been making Spangles TV commercials for nearly 10 years. In 2005, the company produced 23 commercials, nearly one new commercial every two weeks.

=== 2026 ownership change ===
In July 2026, Spangles was acquired by the Hamideh family from its founders, brothers Dale and Craig Steven, ending nearly 50 years of Steven family ownership. Several key staff members from the Steven era remained with the company, including Rene Steven, who continued as director of operations.

== Menu items ==
Spangles serves premium black Angus steakburgers, alongside chicken sandwiches, a Philly cheesesteak on sourdough, and chicken and turkey pita wraps. French fries are the main side, with the option for garlic parmesan, salt & vinegar, buffalo or ranch seasoning.

=== The Beast ===
On Christmas Eve 2013, Spangles introduced "The Beast" Steakburger, which has six steakburger patties and six slices of American cheese, served with mustard, pickles, onions, and ketchup. The burger is still on the menu as of 2026.

=== Breakfast ===
The Spangles breakfast menu includes breakfast sandwiches on sourdough bread and bagel sandwiches. Two breakfast pita sandwiches are offered in sausage, egg, and cheese and breakfast club (scrambled egg, ham, bacon and cheddar cheese) varieties. The chain also serves mini donuts, French toast sticks, and pancakes.

=== Alcohol ===
Spangles introduced 99¢ margaritas and screwdrivers at one of their locations in 2019, and expanded the deal to all of their restaurants in 2020. During the COVID-19 pandemic, Kansas Governor Laura Kelly issued an executive order that allowed for drive-thru and carryout cocktail service during the duration of the pandemic, which allowed Spangles to start selling their alcoholic beverages through the drive-thru. The restaurant serves margaritas (original or strawberry), alongside a cherry limeade made with vodka, and a tequila sunrise.

Due to a change of ownership, as of August 2026, the alcohol license needs to be reapplied for by the new owners so until then, alcohol sales are on hold at all Spangles locations. Also, there needs to be a license for each of the 27 locations, not just one for the whole company.
