= Zombie trademark =

Abandoned trademark assumed by a new business

A zombie trademark, orphan brand or zombie mark is an abandoned trademark from a brand or company which is revived by a new enterprise with no affiliation to the former brand. The purpose of reviving an abandoned trademark is to capitalize on the brand recognition and goodwill that consumers had for the older, unaffiliated brand. The term "ghost brand" may sometimes be used for these, but this is not to be confused with the alternate usage of "ghost mark" to refer to a kind of defensive trademark.

Operating under a zombie trademark can be especially useful to newcomers in an industry who want to reduce the cost and time needed to build up brand recognition and consumer trust, which they can accomplish by linking their products to an older trademark. Consumers may assume that goods and products under the zombie trademark are of the same quality they associate with the old brand. The efficacy of using a zombie trademark to co-opt consumer goodwill is unclear, as some studies have shown that consumers are wary of assuming that revived brands will be of the same quality as they remember.

Only legally abandoned or expired trademarks may become zombie trademarks. Trademarks which are still in use by the original owner or for which there is no clear basis for legal abandonment can not be used as "zombie trademarks", as this would constitute trademark infringement.

== Legality ==
The legality of re-using trademarks which have been removed from registration has recently begun to be contested in countries such as Singapore and New Zealand.

=== US law ===
Under US trademark law, trademarks are considered abandoned after three or more years of non-use by the trademark owner, and if the owner has no plans to use the trademark again in the future. The use of zombie trademarks is legal in certain circumstances. Zombie trademarks do not violate section 2a of the Lanham Act, which prohibits the false suggestion of a connection with an existing trademark, because there is no existing entity who can ownership of an abandoned trademark and can claim to be harmed by association.

In practice, some original trademark owners have filed suits against "zombie trademarks" that revive their abandoned trademarks. These cases are generally based on the argument that the original brand owners still have an interest in the goodwill linked to the "dead" trademark, or that consumers will be deceived by the misleading branding. The original brand owners may also retain ownership of the trademark if it can be shown that they intended to use it again in the future.

=== Australia ===
In Australian trade mark law, applicants can register an existing trademark if it can be proven that the older trademark has fallen into non-use.

== Examples ==
The American company Strategic Marks, LLC began purchasing and using abandoned trademarks related to formerly popular retailers, which it planned to use in connection to online storefronts. In Macy's Inc v. Strategic Marks LLC (2016) it was ruled that "Simply because a store has ceased operations does not mean that its proprietor or owner does not maintain a valid interest in the registered trademark of the business. A trademark can still exist and be owned even after a store closes." A well known example of a zombie trademark is the revival of the Havana Club brand by Bacardi rum.

== See also ==
- Reputation parasitism
