= Tea Rose – Rectanus doctrine =

Common law rule of United States trademark law

The Tea Rose-Rectanus doctrine or remote, good-faith user doctrine is a common law rule of United States trademark law that determines the geographic scope of rights. The doctrine allows a junior user of a mark that is geographically remote from the senior user of the mark to establish priority over a senior user's claim to the mark in the junior user's area. The constructive use and notice sections of the Lanham Act limited the applicability of this doctrine.

== Overview ==
The doctrine is named for two early twentieth-century United States Supreme Court cases, Hanover Star Milling Co. v. Metcalf, (the "Tea Rose" case), and United Drug Co. v. Theodore Rectanus Co..

The Ninth Circuit Court of Appeals in the case of Grupo Gigante SA De CV v. Dallo & Co., Inc., described the rule as follows:

[P]riority of use in one geographic area within the United States does not necessarily suffice to establish priority in another area. Thus, the first user of a mark will not necessarily be able to stop a subsequent user, where the subsequent user is in an area of the country "remote" from the first user's area. The practical effect is that one user may have priority in one area, while another user has priority over the very same mark in a different area. The point of this doctrine is that in the remote area, where no one is likely to know of the earlier user, it is unlikely that consumers would be confused by the second user's use of the mark.

For this doctrine to apply, the junior user must use the mark in good faith outside of the area of the senior user. The Eighth Circuit applies a four factor test to determine the area where the senior user's mark is protected. A junior user may no longer qualify as a good-faith, remote user if the junior user had knowledge of the senior user's mark.

== Modern applicability ==
The remote, good faith user doctrine only applies where the senior user is relying upon common law trademark rights or has a federal registration that post-dates the junior user's first use. A federal registration may allow the senior user to enforce his or her rights anywhere in the U.S., regardless of actual use in any particular location within the country. The principle underlying this doctrine has been codified as part of the Lanham Act, which permits Concurrent use registration where both parties had used the mark in good faith before either party had filed for a federal registration.
