= Concurrent use registration =

Federal trademark registration of the same trademark to two or more unrelated parties

Official seal of the USPTO

A concurrent use registration, in United States trademark law, is a federal trademark registration of the same trademark to two or more unrelated parties, with each party having a registration limited to a distinct geographic area. Such a registration is achieved by filing a concurrent use application (or by converting an existing application to a concurrent use application) and then prevailing in a concurrent use proceeding before the Trademark Trial and Appeal Board ("TTAB"), which is a judicial body within the United States Patent and Trademark Office ("USPTO"). A concurrent use application may be filed with respect to a trademark which is already registered or otherwise in use by another party, but may be allowed to go forward based on the assertion that the existing use can co-exist with the new registration without causing consumer confusion.

The authority for this type of registration is set forth in the Lanham Act, which permits concurrent use registration where the concurrent use applicant made a good-faith adoption of the mark prior to the registrant filing an application for registration. Such registrations are most commonly achieved by agreement of the parties involved, although the USPTO must still determine that no confusion will be caused.

== Statutory basis ==
The authority of the USPTO to issue a concurrent use registration is set forth in the Lanham Act, section 2 (d), enacted in 1947 and coded at 15 U.S.C. § 1052, which states in relevant part:

Provided: That if the Director determines that confusion, mistake, or deception is not likely to result from the continued use by more than one person of the same or similar marks under conditions and limitations as to the mode or place of use of the marks or the goods on or in connection with which such marks are used, concurrent registrations may be issued to such persons when they have become entitled to use such marks as a result of their concurrent lawful use in commerce prior to

(1) the earliest of the filing dates of the applications pending or of any registration issued under this Act;
(2) July 5, 1947, in the case of registrations previously issued under the Act of March 3, 1881, or February 20, 1905, and continuing in full force and effect on that date; or
(3) July 5, 1947, in the case of applications filed under the Act of February 20, 1905, and registered after July 5, 1947.

Use prior to the filing date of any pending application or a registration shall not be required when the owner of such application or registration consents to the grant of a concurrent registration to the applicant. Concurrent registrations may also be issued by the Director when a court of competent jurisdiction has finally determined that more than one person is entitled to use the same or similar marks in commerce. In issuing concurrent registrations, the Director shall prescribe conditions and limitations as to the mode or place of use of the mark or the goods on or in connection with which such mark is registered to the respective persons.

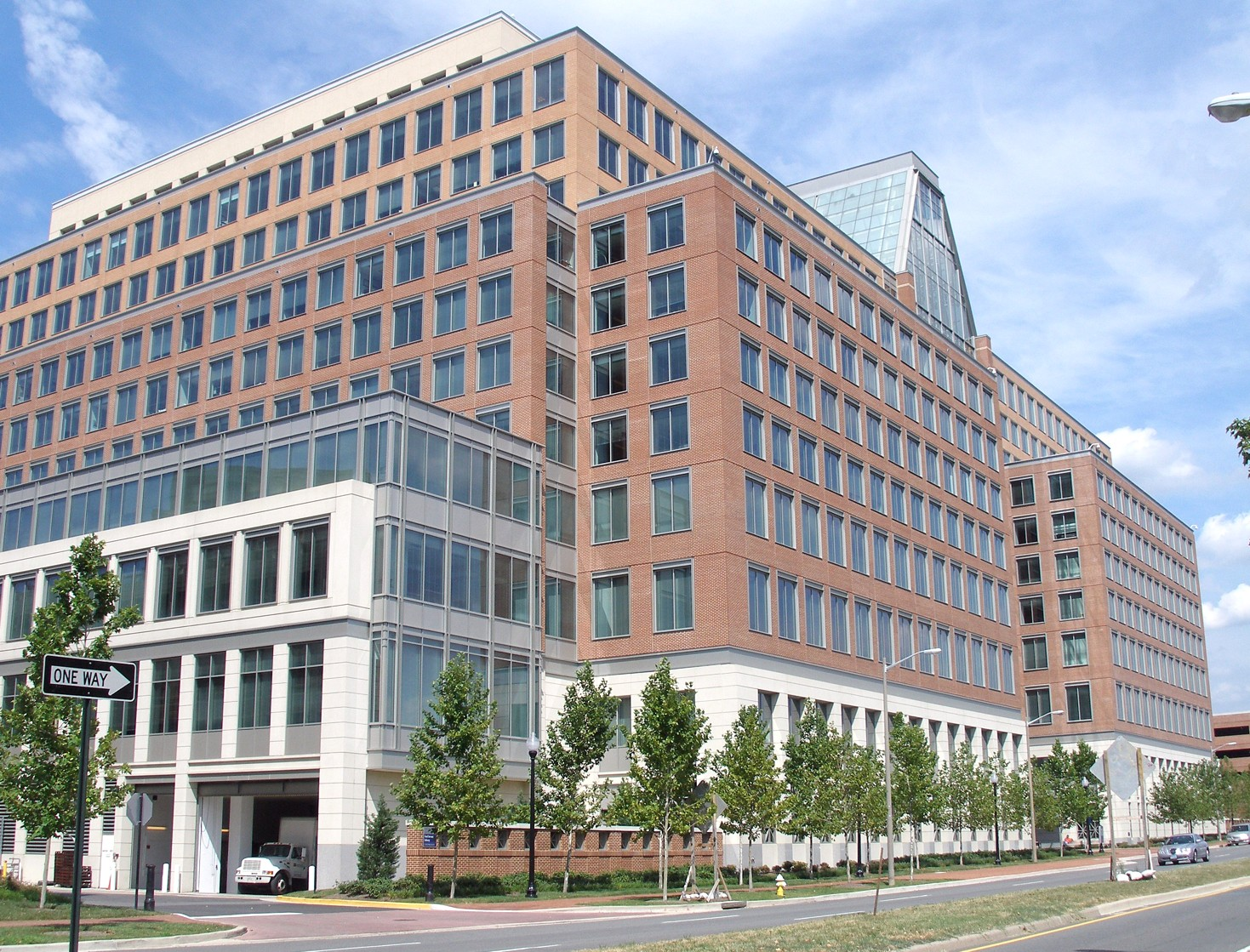
The headquarters of the United States Patent and Trademark Office in Alexandria, Virginia, where Concurrent Use applications are evaluated.

Through these provisions, the Act effectively places three requirements on marks for which a later applicant seeks a concurrent use registration:

1) the later applicant must have used the mark in commerce prior to the time that the earlier registrant filed its application for registration, unless the senior registrant consents to the junior user's registration;
2) the later applicant's use in commerce must have been lawful
3) concurrent use of the marks must not result in a likelihood of confusion.

The statute essentially codifies the Tea Rose-Rectanus doctrine, established by the United States Supreme Court in two cases decided in 1916 and 1918. The Court had established in those cases that a junior user of a mark that is geographically remote from the senior user of the mark may establish priority over a senior user's claim to the mark in the junior user's area.

Any party may voluntarily limit the geographic scope of its application while conceding the rights of another party to a different geographic territory. A concurrent use application may not be filed based on a party's intent to use a mark, but must rely on actual use in commerce. The concurrent use application must identify all other parties who are entitled to use the mark, and provide the names and addresses of the parties identified. Instead of making the usual assertion that no other party has the right to use the mark, the applicant must assert that no other party "except as specified in the application" has such a right.

Where two or more geographically unrestricted applications are pending at the same time, and no registration has yet been issued, the USPTO will proceed with the earliest application, and put all later applications on hold pending a determination on the earliest.

=== Use in commerce prior to an adverse filing for registration ===
By the terms of the Act, the critical dates with respect to concurrent registration are the date of the applicant's first use and the earliest filing date of any other registrant. In other words, as the Trademark Trial and Appeal Board Manual of Procedure ("TBMP") states, "an application seeking concurrent registration through a concurrent use proceeding normally must assert a date of first use in commerce prior to the earliest application filing date of the application(s)... involved in the proceeding."

The Lanham Act requires that an Applicant's use in commerce must have been lawful. The TTAB (and its predecessor, the United States Court of Customs and Patent Appeals ("CCPA")) has read this to mean that the applicant's use must not have infringed another party's use at the time that applicant adopted its mark. Therefore, one potential pitfall facing applicant is that "[g]enerally, concurrent rights arise when a party, in good faith, and without knowledge of a prior party's use in another geographic area, adopts and uses the same or similar mark for the same or similar goods or services within its own geographic area."

The mere fact that an applicant's use was geographically remote from a registrant or other opposer's use does not establish good faith, as "courts have generally held that the remote use defense... is unavailable where the junior user adopts a substantially identical mark in a remote geographic area with full knowledge of the senior user's prior use elsewhere." However, the TTAB has also previously held that "mere knowledge of the existence of the prior user should not, by itself, constitute bad faith."

=== Likelihood of confusion ===
The factors under which the TTAB evaluates the likelihood of confusion were established in In re E. I. du Pont de Nemours & Co., and are commonly referred to as the "du Pont factors".

The thirteen du Pont factors are:

(1) The similarity or dissimilarity of the marks in their entireties as to appearance, sound, connotation and commercial impression.
(2) The similarity or dissimilarity and nature of the goods or services as described in an application or registration or in connection with which a prior mark is in use.
(3) The similarity or dissimilarity of established, likely-to-continue trade channels.
(4) The conditions under which and buyers to whom sales are made, i.e. "impulse" vs. careful, sophisticated purchasing.
(5) The fame of the prior mark (sales, advertising, length of use).
(6) The number and nature of similar marks in use on similar goods.
(7) The nature and extent of any actual confusion.
(8) The length of time during and conditions under which there has been concurrent use without evidence of actual confusion.
(9) The variety of goods on which a mark is or is not used (house mark, "family" mark, product mark).
(10) The market interface between applicant and the owner of a prior mark:

(a) a mere "consent" to register or use.
(b) agreement provisions designed to preclude confusion, i.e. limitations on continued use of the marks by each party.
(c) assignment of mark, application, registration and good will of the related business.
(d) laches and estoppel attributable to owner of prior mark and indicative of lack of confusion.

(11) The extent to which applicant has a right to exclude others from use of its mark on its goods.
(12) The extent of potential confusion, i.e., whether de minimis or substantial.
(13) Any other established fact probative of the effect of use.

In many instances, only a few of the categories will be applicable to the facts of the case before the TTAB.

== Procedure to acquire ==
The procedures to acquire such a registration are set forth in the TBMP Chapter 1100. They are initiated when a concurrent use application is submitted to the USPTO, which will initiate a concurrent use proceeding to determine if the applicant is entitled to such registration. An existing application that has been denied registration because of a conflict with an existing mark may be converted into a concurrent use application against that existing mark. In either case, the applicant must assert that its mark was used in commerce before the owner of the existing registration, called the "senior registrant", had filed its own application for registration. The applicant must also demonstrate that the marks can both be used in their specific geographic areas without causing a likelihood of confusion.

The USPTO will contact the senior registrant to inform that party of the claim against their mark. The proceeding in which the respective rights of the parties are determined is like a trial in which the applicant must submit evidence showing that the applicant had adopted the mark in good faith, that the applicant had adopted the mark prior to the senior registrant's date of registration, and that the confusion is not likely. The senior registrant may present evidence to the contrary, in order to prevent the loss of control over the use of the registered mark in the applicant's claimed territory. Both parties may take discovery in the form of requests for admission, interrogatories, requests for production, and depositions. As with a regular trial, the TTAB may be called upon to resolve disputes over whether discovery requests are overbroad, and whether discovery responses are inadequate.

The senior registrant in such a proceeding has ample incentive to oppose the grant of a concurrent use registration, because a registered trademark is presumed to apply throughout the entire United States. Thus, the grant of a concurrent use registration carves out some geographic territory from the senior registrant's exclusive control.

As 15 U.S.C. § 1052 (d) indicates, a concurrent use registration may also be issued "when a court of competent jurisdiction has finally determined that more than one person is entitled to use the same or similar marks in commerce." As a matter of right, the TTAB will issue such a registration pursuant to a court order that an applicant has the right to use its mark in certain geographic area. Where a court has issued such an order, a concurrent use proceeding is not needed, as evidence has already been taken in the court proceeding, and the rights of the parties have already been determined.

Most concurrent use proceedings result in a legal settlement between the parties. Frequently, one party will surrender its concurrent use claim and instead receive a trademark license from the other party. In other situations, each party may agree to geographic limitations on its use of the mark at issue, which the TTAB will honor if the settlement stipulates to facts which show that no confusion is likely. A benefit of such an agreement is that the parties can agree to terms beyond the scope of the TTAB's decision, such as specific restrictions on time and place of advertising, or modifications to the appearance of either mark. However, irrespective of the agreement reached, the TTAB must still make an independent finding that no consumer confusion is likely to result from the concurrent use registration. Even if both parties assert that no confusion is likely, the TTAB may still make findings of fact which demonstrate that confusion is likely, and deny registration to the junior user of the mark.

A pivotal factor in assessing the likelihood of confusion in such a circumstance "is whether the parties whose marks are in question have agreed, in some form, to memorialize methods of avoiding confusion." In that case, the court held that such an agreement "is viewed in light of the parties' interests and the prevailing marketplace", further stating:

The weight to be given more detailed agreements should be substantial. Thus when those most familiar with use in the marketplace and most interested in precluding confusion enter agreements designed to avoid it, the scales of evidence are clearly tilted. It is at least difficult to maintain a subjective view that confusion will occur when those directly concerned say it won't. A mere assumption that confusion is likely will rarely prevail against uncontroverted evidence from those on the firing line that it is not.

Furthermore, the issuance of concurrent use registrations need not prevent either party from engaging in advertising or other activities which might result in the incidental publication of one registrant's mark in the territory of the other registrant. In the Amalgamated Bank case, the Federal Circuit found acceptable a term in the agreement that "nothing in this agreement will preclude Amalgamated New York from conducting advertising which might enter in the State of Illinois or from dealing with customers who happen to be located in the State of Illinois." Courts have similarly held that a concurrent use registration does not curtail either party from advertising over the Internet, particularly where the junior user includes a disclaimer of some form on their website.

== Geographic divisions ==
A concurrent use registration can be very detailed in the geographic divisions laid down. It may, for example, allow one party to own the right to use a mark within a fifty-mile radius around a handful of selected cities or counties, while the other party owns the right to use the same mark everywhere else in the country. It may even divide the rights to use a mark within a particular city by reference to roads or other landmarks in that city.

The TTAB succinctly describes its territorial analysis in Weiner King, Inc. v. Wiener King Corp.:

Turning to the fundamental question in this case, i.e., who gets what territory, this court has suggested certain criteria which are helpful in resolving this question. In In re Beatrice Foods Co.... this court noted that actual use in a territory was not necessary to establish rights in that territory, and that the inquiry should focus on the party's (1) previous business activity; (2) previous expansion or lack thereof; (3) dominance of contiguous areas; (4) presently-planned expansion; and, where applicable (5) possible market penetration by means of products brought in from other areas.

The TTAB has found that in concurrent use proceedings, "[t]he area for which registration is sought is usually more extensive than the area in which applicant is actually using the mark." "As a general rule, a prior user of a mark is entitled to a registration covering the entire United States limited only to the extent that the subsequent user can establish that no likelihood of confusion exists and that it has concurrent rights in its actual area of use, plus its area of natural expansion."

Between lawful concurrent users of the same mark in geographically separate markets, the senior registrant has the right to maintain his registration for at least those market areas in which it is using the mark. However, the senior registrant does not always maintain the right to use the mark in territories not yet occupied by either party. In Pinocchio's Pizza, for example, the first applicant (but the junior user of the mark in commerce) owned one small restaurant in Maryland and had expressed no plans for expansion, while the second applicant (but senior user of the mark in commerce) owned multiple restaurants in Texas and was planning aggressive expansion. The TTAB held that "purpose of the statute is best served by granting [the second] applicant a registration for the entire United States except for registrant's trading area." The TTAB therefore restricted the first applicant's registration to permit exclusive use in Maryland, and within 50 miles of the first applicant's restaurant in areas crossing into other states.

Furthermore, although the general rule provides that the entire United States should be covered by the respective registrations, it is permissible for parties to a proceeding to resolve the issue of territorial rights in a way that leaves some part of the country uncovered entirely. In a contested proceeding In re Beatrice Foods Co., the court held that the senior user of a mark was entitled to a registration covering the entire United States, outside of the junior user's area of actual use. However, the court went on to say:

The foregoing is not intended to imply that the Patent Office is required to issue registrations covering the whole of the United States in all circumstances. Certainly the applicant or applicants may always request territorially restricted registrations. In addition, in carrying out the Commissioner's duty under the proviso of § 2(d) of determining whether confusion, mistake or deception is likely to result from the continued concurrent use of a mark by two or more parties, it may be held that such likelihood will be prevented only when each party is granted a very limited territory with parts of the United States granted to no one.

The few courts that have considered the antitrust implications of concurrent use registration have determined that it does not raise any violation of antitrust laws. Although it is considered a violation of such laws for companies to agree to divide up geographic territories for the sale of goods, concurrent use agreements dividing up trademark territories are specifically provided for by Congress. Furthermore, even with such an agreement in place, a company can still sell competing products in the trademark territory of another company, so long as the intruding party sells that product under a different mark.

== Impact ==
The availability of concurrent use registration is not commonly invoked, even where the applicant might stand an excellent chance of demonstrating the existence of geographically distinct markets. Proceedings before the TTAB, like proceedings before any court, can be expensive and time-consuming. A contested concurrent use proceeding may last for two or three years before the resolution of a claim, and the outcome will remain uncertain until the end. The outcome of the proceeding will then be subject to an appeal before the United States Court of Appeals for the Federal Circuit, or to a collateral challenge in a United States District Court.

Perhaps the most notable instance of a continuing concurrent use registration is that of Holiday Inn. Although the national chain owns numerous trademark registrations, there is one registration for an unrelated "Holiday Inn" which is "restricted to the area comprising the town of Myrtle Beach, S.C.". The Myrtle Beach hotel had used that name since the 1940s, and initiated a concurrent use proceeding in 1970. While this proceeding was pending, the national chain commenced an action in the United States District Court. The concurrent use proceeding was suspended during the pendency of the federal litigation, which resulted in a judgment in 1973 authorizing the Myrtle Beach hotel to use a distinctive, noninfringing Holiday Inn service mark within the Town of Myrtle Beach. The concurrent use proceeding resumed, and in 1976, the United States Court of Customs and Patent Appeals awarded the Myrtle Beach hotel a federal trademark registration.

Even where a concurrent use registration is issued, the parties may eventually come to an agreement under which one party will surrender its registration. In some instances, a party will simply happen to cease using the mark in favor of a new brand name, and the registration will lapse. In other cases, the larger company will eventually acquire the smaller.

A final note is that concurrent use registration was devised before the advent of the Internet, which serves to diminish geographic distinctions between sellers. John L. Welch, a Harvard-educated attorney who writes a well-known blog on the proceedings of the TTAB, has noted that "vigorously contested proceedings may well make it clear that concurrent use registrations are, in this Internet Age, a dying breed".

== Sources ==
- Trademark Manual of Examining Procedure, § 1207.04, "Concurrent Use Registration".
- Trademark Trial and Appeal Board Manual of Procedure, Chapter 1100, "Concurrent Use Proceedings".
