= Reputation parasitism =

Legal term regarding marketing

Reputation parasitism, reputation leeching or credibility leeching is a legal term regarding marketing. It refers to when one advertiser uses another brand's good reputation to market their own product. The legal concept of reputation parasitism originates in the Nordic nations. In many places it is illegal to do so. For instance in Sweden it is outlawed according to Marknadsföringslagen ("Swedish Marketing Act") (1995:450).

The Finnish Market Court expanded its interpretation of the Unfair Business Practices Act to treat reputation parasitism as an enforceable violation of fair business practices, bringing Finnish law more closely in line with Swedish law.

Examples of reputation parasitism include having a product in a design that is very similar to an existing product or using a similar name. The concept of reputation parasitism has also been applied to counterfeit consumer goods, which can also leech off of and damage the reputation of established brands.

== See also ==
- Zombie trademark
