= Ghost mark =

Trademark registered without the intention of using it

Ghost marks are trademarks which closely simulate ordinary words or phrases used in the course of trade, and which are not intended to be used as genuine trade marks. This is not to be confused with the usage of "ghost brand" to refer to the revival of an abandoned trademark by a new company.

== Examples ==
In the case of Imperial Group v. Philip Morris 1982 FSR 72, the plaintiff endeavored to register the trade mark "MERIT" for cigarette products, but was unable to do so on the grounds that the trade mark was too descriptive. Instead, it registered the mark "NERIT", without any intention of using the mark, but in order to prevent other traders from using the mark "MERIT" because it would be considered too similar to the registered mark "NERIT". The intention was the obtain a de facto monopoly over the unregisterable mark "MERIT".

The defendant began using the mark "MERIT" for cigarettes and was sued by the plaintiff for infringing its mark "NERIT".

The court struck down the registration for "NERIT" on the basis that the plaintiff had no genuine intention to use the mark (despite some "trivial and insubstantial" efforts at launching a NERIT-branded product).

Prior to the decision in Imperial Group, ghost marks were a commonplace tactical procedure for trade mark owners. Ghost marks are now rarely filed following this decision. A somewhat similar protection to that offered by ghost marks are available through the use of defensive trade marks.
