= Wiener King =

American restaurant and defunct franchise

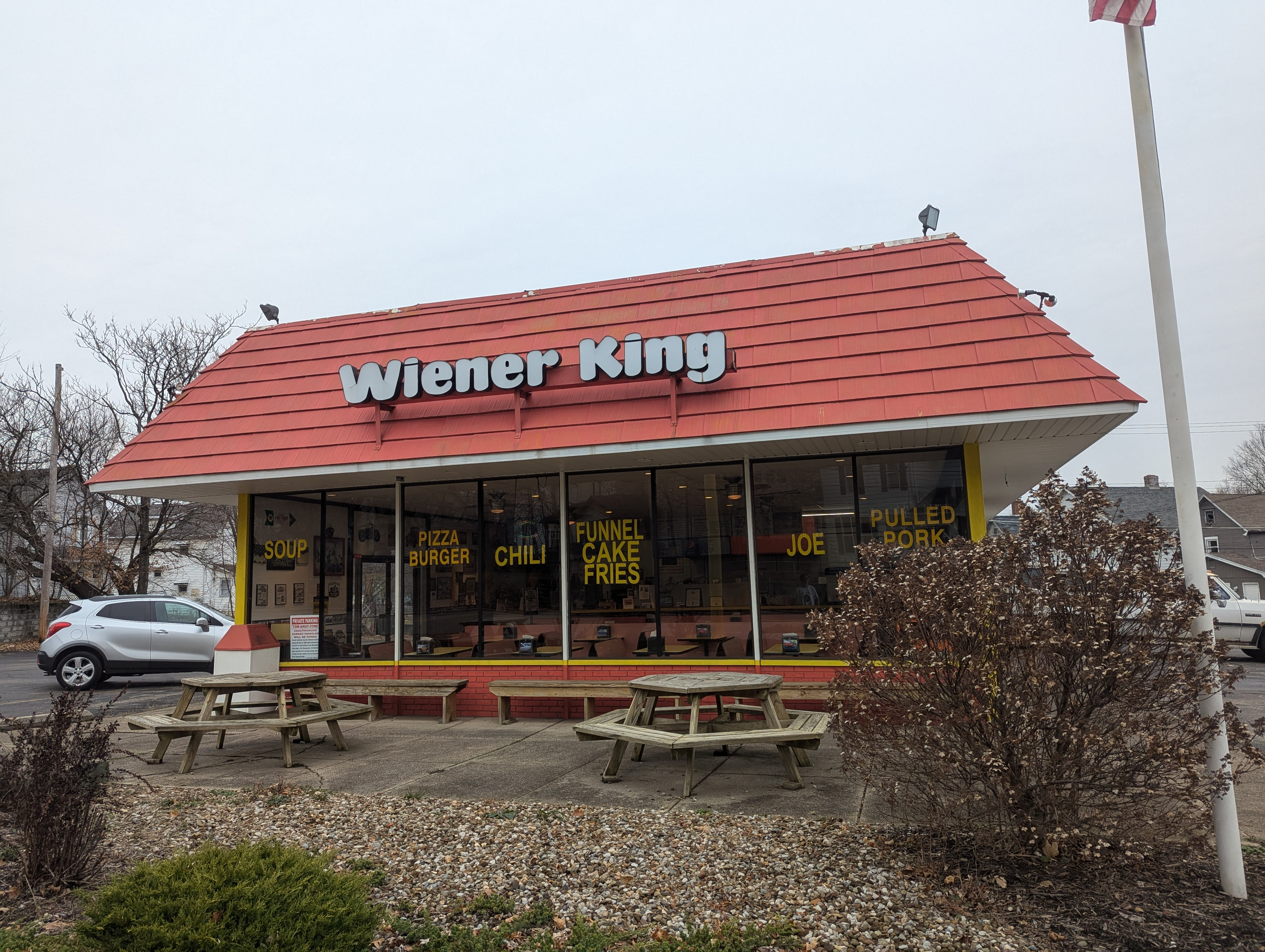
- Interactive map of Wiener King

Restaurant information
- Established: 1976
- Owner: Jimmy Smardjeff
- Previous owner: Christ Smardjeff
- Food type: Fast food
- Location: 118 Lexington Ave, Mansfield, Ohio, United States
- Coordinates: 40°45′01″N 82°31′08″W
- Website: Facebook

Wiener King is a hot-dog company that currently operates one restaurant located in Mansfield, Ohio. Wiener King was formerly a franchise, but has since closed all but one of their restaurants. The chain was founded in 1970 by Ronald W. Howard, in Charlotte, North Carolina. Wiener King was once one of the fastest growing restaurants in the United States. It was well known for its advertising and publicity. In 1975, Wiener King was sued by another chain with a similar name.

== History ==
=== Founding ===
In 1970, Ronald Howard, a former plumber from Birmingham, Alabama, formed the Wiener King franchise. Howard had moved to Charlotte in 1968 to take over a local franchise called Pasquale's Pizza. He was quickly able to grow the restaurant from 1 to 18 locations. However he wanted to run a restaurant that belonged to him. Howard noted that hot dogs were a very popular food, but had never been merchandised.

=== Growth ===
In 1976, the chain had at least 70 locations from New York to Florida. At this time, Ronald Howard owned and ran the company while his wife managed their 100-acre farm. In 1977, a customer complained that the footlong hot dogs were not, in fact, 12 inches. In response, Howard lengthened the hot dogs to a full 12 inches. By July 1978, the company had 168 locations and a training facility in Charlotte for franchise owners and store managers.

=== Decline and bankruptcy ===
In November 1978, Wiener King filed for Chapter 11 bankruptcy. It had severe cash flow issues and was unable to settle its debts. The company had rapidly expanded, and the revenue did not match the pace of growth, resulting in financial strain. Additionally, it encountered difficulties in collecting fees from franchise owners. By 1979, Wiener King's headquarters went up for sale.

In 1975, the company was sued by another company using a similar name, but the Trademark Trial and Appeal Board's eventual ruling did not affect Wiener King negatively.

In 1982, the presiding bankruptcy judge overseeing Wiener King's case concluded that Howard had made false statements and removed him from his position as president of the company. Allegations prompted an FBI investigation into claims of tax evasion and the misappropriation of funds for sustaining the business. A consultant recommended the sale of the company, expressing reservations about Howard's suitability in its management. Creditors hoped that liquidation could be avoided.

In 1983, a Pennsylvania couple acquired the company through auction proceedings for $100,000 and relocated its headquarters to their hometown of Easton. They aspired to revive the Wiener King brand, but its prominence waned in the ensuing years. Several Wiener King franchises in Charlotte remained operational under different brands. By this time, the company had diminished to only 40 stores. Approximately $2.5 million of the company's debts were never repaid.

=== Post-acquisition ===
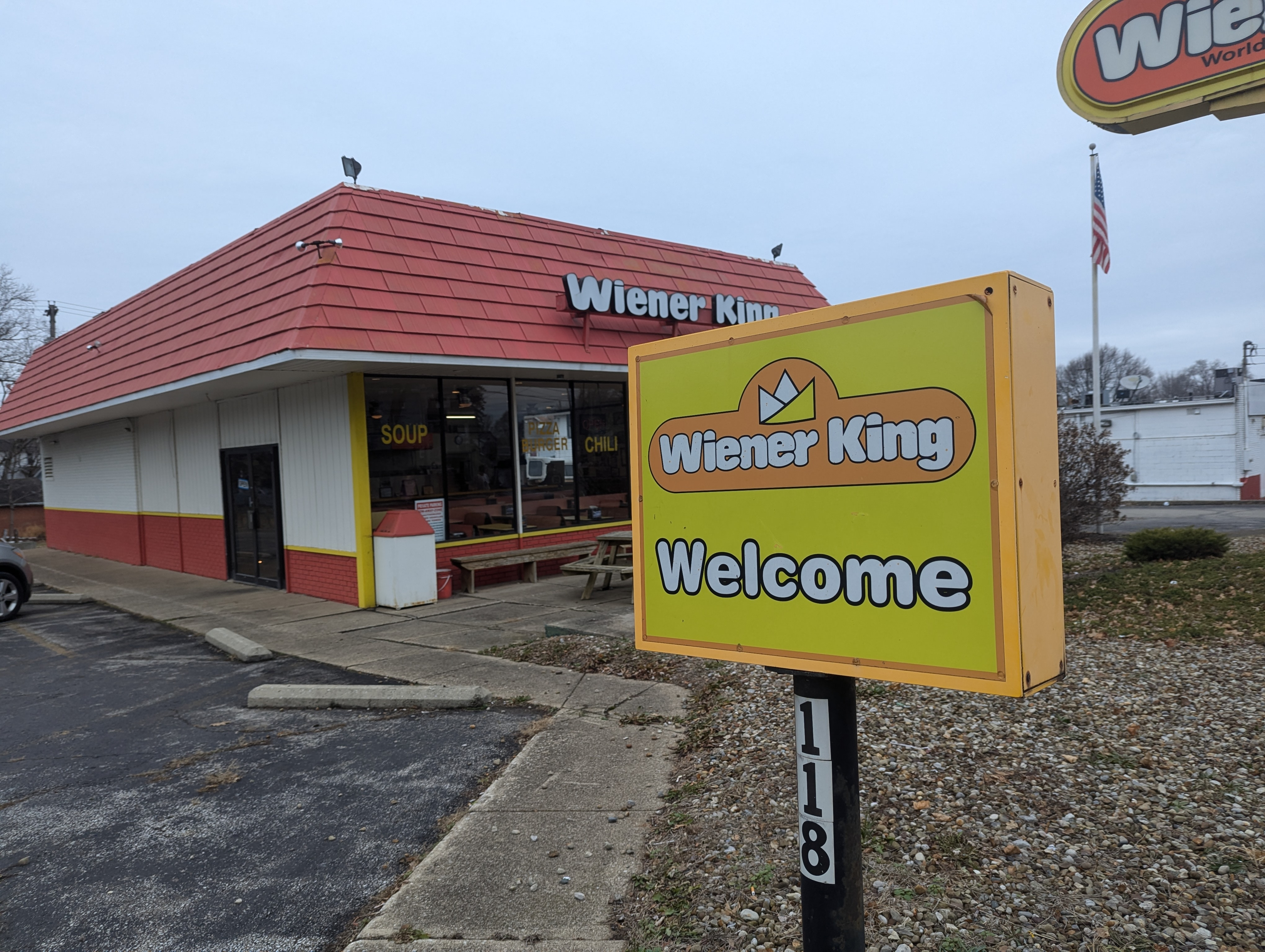
Wiener King exterior welcome sign in Mansfield, Ohio

Several Wiener King franchises opted to alter their identities due to discontent with their corporate affiliation, choosing to operate independently. For instance, in 1978, four Wiener Kings located in Greensboro and one in High Point rebranded themselves as "Sally's". These locations maintained the same menu. Similarly, in 1987, several Wiener Kings changed their name to Wiener Works, subsequently breaking away from the parent company. Some of these locations remain open. Additionally, some locations became Coney Island restaurants. This trajectory appears to have been followed by multiple Wiener King establishments in the Fayetteville region, originally established in 1973. As of 2024, many former Wiener King establishments continue to operate under their changed names.

One store in Mansfield, Ohio still operates under the Wiener King name, as do several hot dog carts in North Carolina. The location in Mansfield still operates similarly to how it did when it first opened in 1976. The restaurant is owned and operated by Jimmy Smardjeff. In 2018, the location was at risk of closing.

=== Ronald Howard ===
Ronald W. Howard was born on April 26, 1941, in Alabama. He went to Ramsay High School in Birmingham. He served in the US Army National Guard for 7 years. He had one son, Michael. Howard died February 21, 2016, at the age of 74. He had moved back to Alabama following the bankruptcy of his company.

== Operations ==
=== Franchising ===
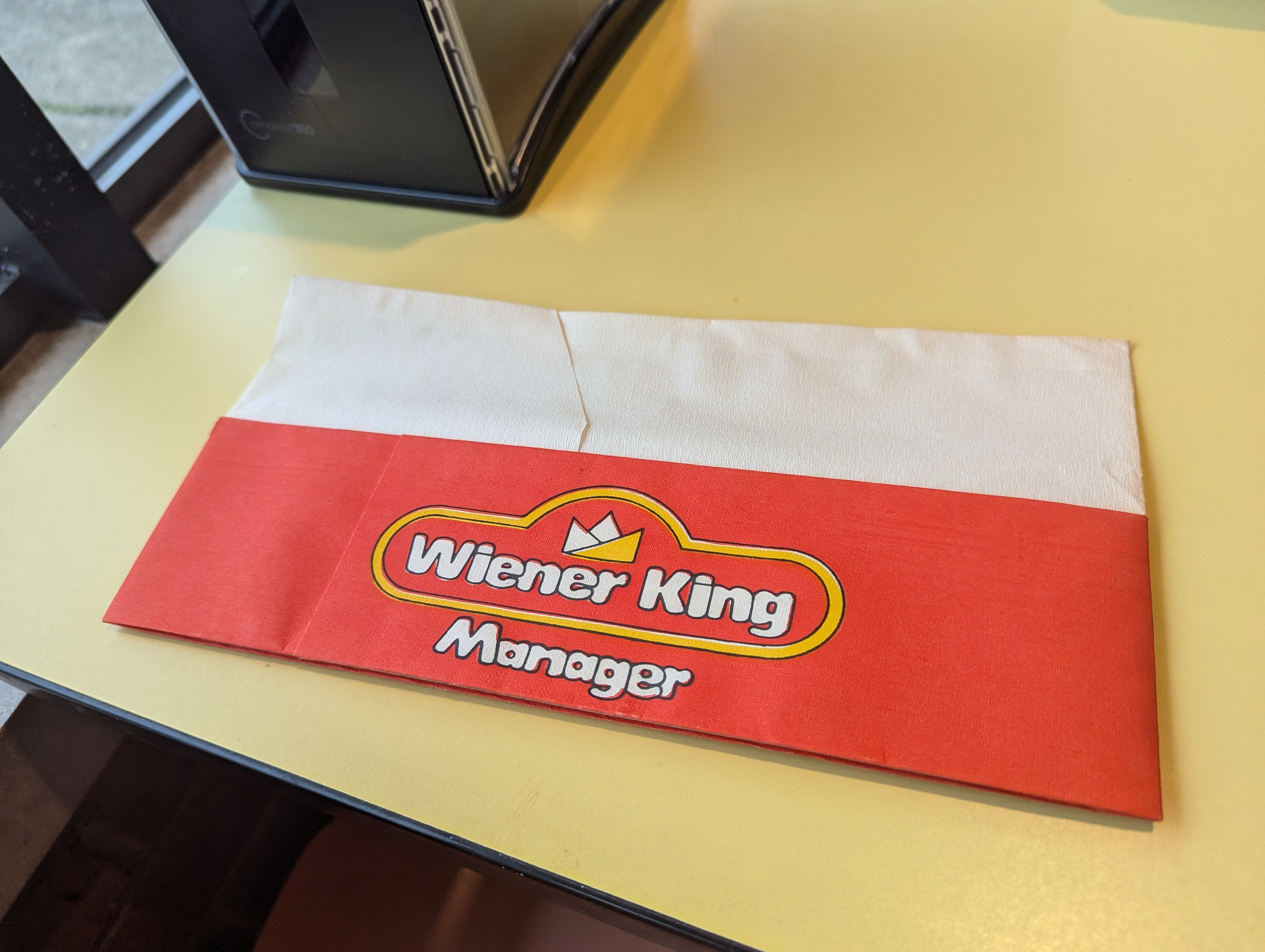
Wiener King paper manager hat

Wiener King was a franchise, therefore most locations of the restaurant were not owned by Ron Howard himself. This, in part, is what allowed the company to grow so rapidly. As of 1976, in order to open a Wiener King location, a franchisee must have had at least $18,750 in cash to purchase a small unit, which has a total price tag of $41,750. The large unit required a cash outlay of $30,000 and had a total cost of $65,000. The Wiener King company required financing to be secured by the franchise owner.

Once a prospect had applied for a Wiener King franchise, it went through corporate decision-makers and a market analysis before the franchise was granted. After everything had been finalized, the franchise was to be visited by an operations consultant as well as a quality control representative before opening.

Supplies and food were not bought from Wiener King Corp. Wiener King franchisees purchased all supplies directly from purveyors on national contracts established by the company's operations department.

=== Locations ===
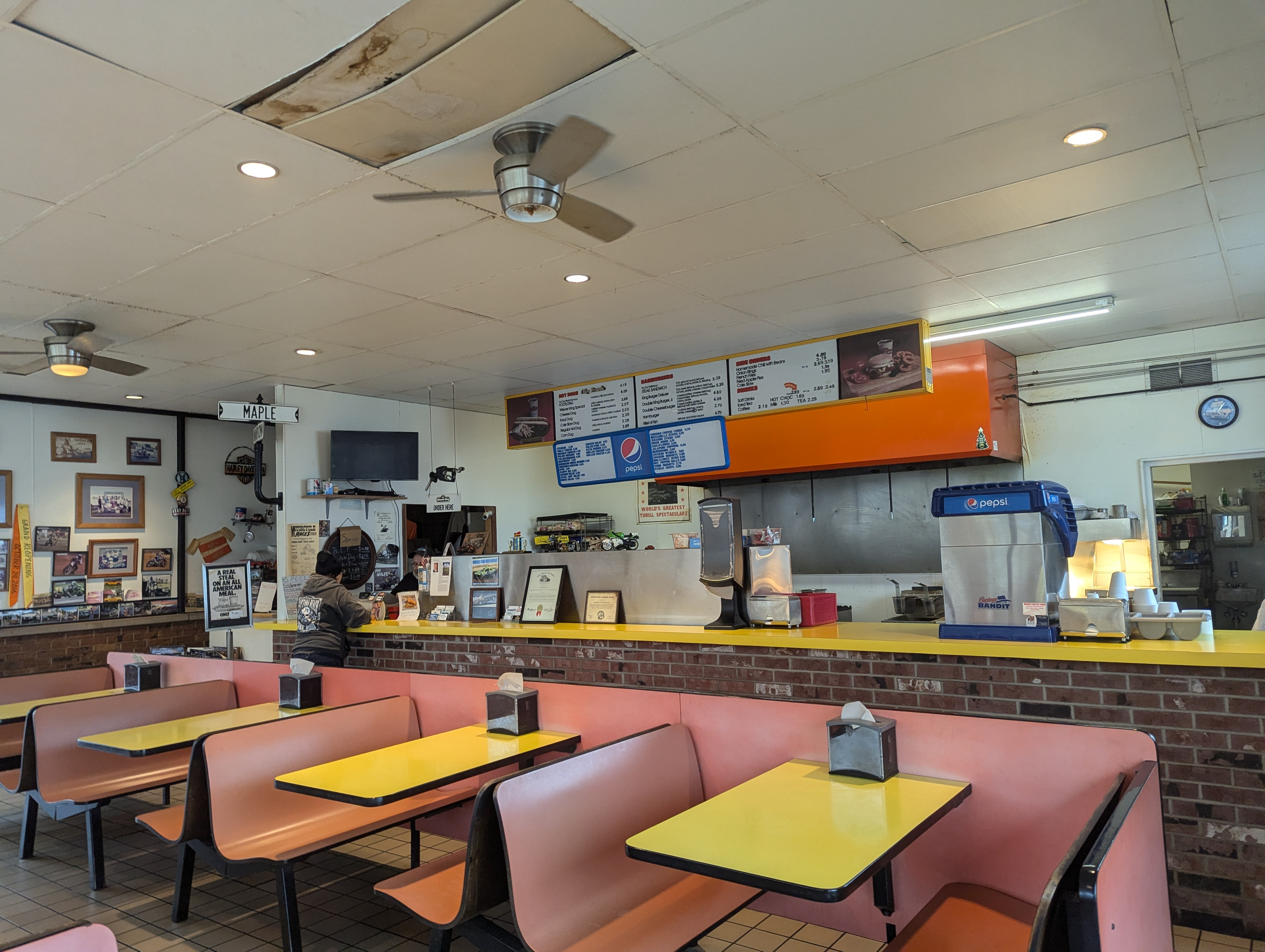
The interior of the Mansfield location

Wiener King had locations in over half of US states, but mostly had locations in the eastern United States. The highest concentration of restaurants was in the Carolinas. At one time the franchise had 174 locations. One location remains open in Mansfield, Ohio. The headquarters of the company was in Charlotte, North Carolina.

=== Marketing ===
An early marketing strategy of Wiener King was making controversial advertisements. One advertisement included a Charlotte DJ, Jay Thomas, wearing nothing but a towel and holding a hot dog under his arm. In 1974 at least one TV station refused to air the commercial. In 1975, the company gained attention for flying a hot air balloon that said "Wiener King" 50 feet above President Gerald Ford's visit to Freedom Park in Charlotte. The company ran newspaper advertisements. Their tagline was "King of Hot dogs, USA." The company handed out paper crowns to children, as does the modern restaurant Burger King.

=== Menu ===
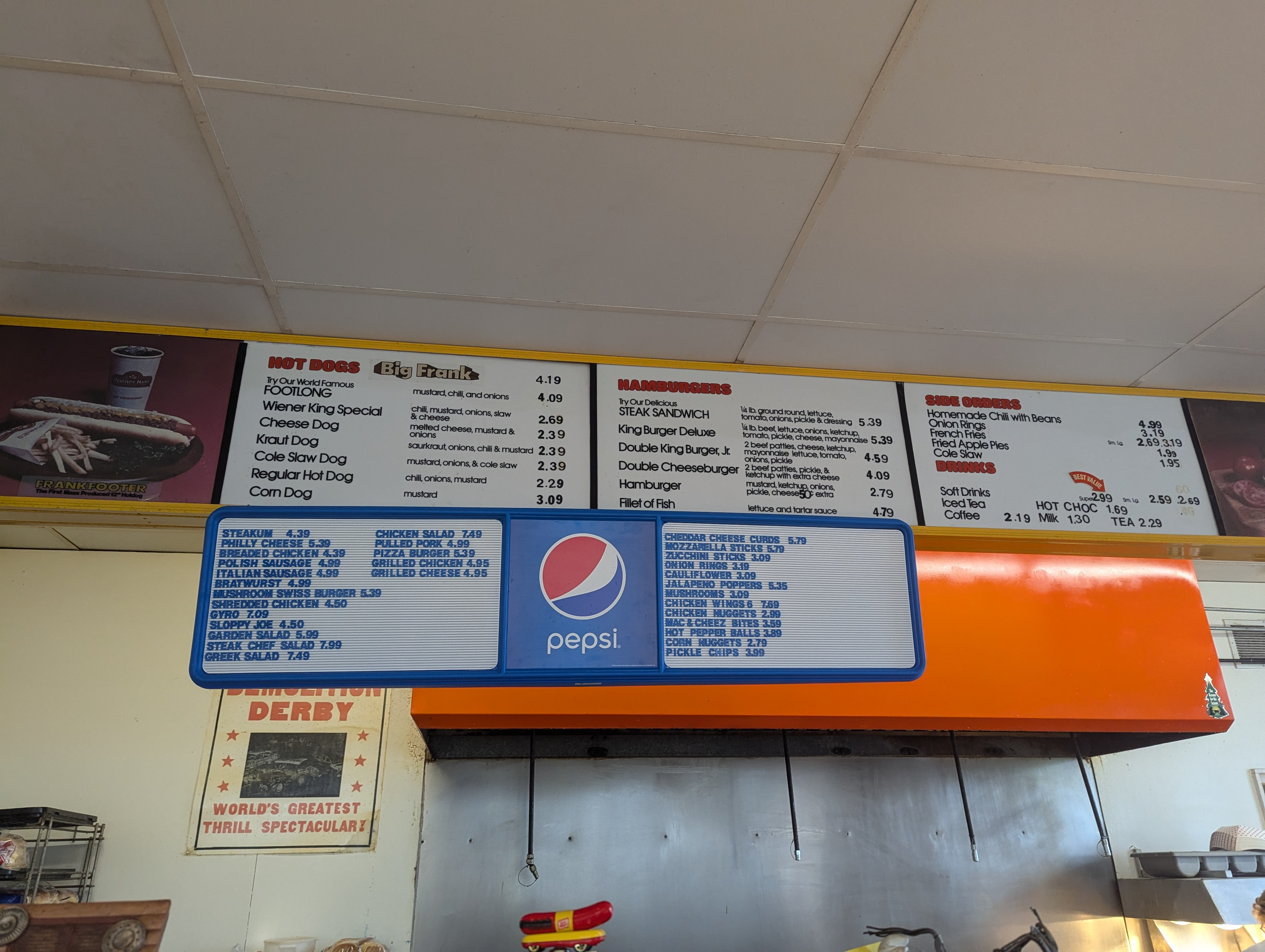
The menu at Wiener King

The restaurant served hot dogs, chili dogs, hamburgers, and other typical fast food menu items. Most notably footlong hot dogs were served. The chain also offered a quarter pound meal called the "Big Frank". Currently, the Mansfield location has footlong hot dogs, sandwiches, hamburgers, and milkshakes.

== Name dispute ==
=== Background ===
In 1975, a two-chain company from New Jersey also called Weiner King (Weiner King, Inc) filed to cancel Wiener King's (Wiener King Corp) federal registrations. In 1975, Weiner King, Inc sued Wiener King Corp over the use of the name. The New Jersey company had been founded in 1962, eight years prior to Howard's. Despite using the mark since its founding, Weiner King did not seek federal registration until 1975. Howard's Wiener King had no prior knowledge of Weiner King's existence upon adopting the mark, but expanded its operations extensively across multiple states after learning of Weiner King's existence.

=== Legal actions and court decisions ===
The North Carolina Wiener Kings filed concurrent use applications in 1974, subsequently amending them to acknowledge Weiner King's rights in New Jersey. Weiner King initiated a civil action against Howard's Wiener King in 1975, alleging trademark violations. Concurrent use proceedings were initiated by the Patent and Trademark Office, consolidated with the cancellation proceedings, and suspended pending the outcome of the civil action.

The District Court granted Weiner King a preliminary injunction in 1976, restricting Howard's Wiener King's use of the mark within certain areas. It issued a permanent injunction, canceled Howard's Wiener King's registrations, and tasked the PTO with determining the parties' rights. Howard's Wiener King appealed to the Third Circuit Court of Appeals, which reversed and remanded the case in 1976. The Court of Appeals disagreed with the extent of Weiner King's trade territory and directed the PTO to resolve the concurrent use issues. The Court of Appeals ordered the PTO to consider the parties' rights in Beach Haven, New Jersey.

=== Outcome ===
The Trademark Trial and Appeal Board (TTAB) enunciated several principles for issuing concurrent use registrations or resolving territorial disputes among trademark users. These principles include recognizing the right of a prior user to protection and registration of its mark and acknowledging the right of a good faith and innocent junior adopter to defend its rights within a distinct territory. Emphasizing the Lanham Act's objective to provide nationwide protection for expanding businesses, the TTAB highlighted the need to balance these rights to ensure a marketplace free of confusion. In the case at hand, the TTAB noted Weiner King's localized operations over thirteen years, with limited advertising within 15 miles of Flemington, New Jersey.

The TTAB observed the sporadic use and abandonment of Weiner King's Beach Haven facility, leading to a lack of rights in that area. Additionally, it deemed Weiner King's post-1975 expansions, such as the facility in Warminster, Pennsylvania, belated and lacking good faith. Conversely, Howard's Wiener King's innocent adoption of its mark, extensive expansion efforts, franchising activities, advertising expenditures, and commercial success were duly recognized.

As a result the TTAB restricted Weiner King's rights to a fifteen-mile radius around Flemington, while granting Howard's Wiener King concurrent use rights nationwide, except within Weiner King's trading area. Furthermore, the TTAB recommended denying Weiner King's registration applications unless amended to reflect its rights within the designated trading area. Finally, it determined that Weiner King held no rights in Beach Haven, New Jersey, due to sporadic use and abandonment.

The case is sometimes cited in discussions of concurrent use registration.
