= Imperial Group plc v Philip Morris Ltd =

Imperial Group plc v Philip Morris Ltd, 1982 FSR 72, was a case of the Court of Appeal of England and Wales. The plaintiff endeavoured to register the trade mark "MERIT" for cigarette products, but was unable to do so on the grounds that the trade mark was too descriptive. Instead, it registered the mark "NERIT", without any intention of using the mark, but in order to prevent other traders from using the mark "MERIT" because it would be considered too similar to the registered mark "NERIT". The intention was to obtain a de facto monopoly over the unregisterable mark "MERIT".

The defendant began using the mark "MERIT" for cigarettes and was sued by the plaintiff for infringing its mark "NERIT".

The court struck down the registration for "NERIT" on the basis that the plaintiff had no genuine intention to use the mark (despite some "trivial and insubstantial" efforts at launching a NERIT-branded product).

== See also ==
- Ghost mark
