= Domain privacy =

Domain name registrar service

Domain privacy (often called Whois privacy) is a service offered by a number of domain name registrars. A user buys privacy from the company, who in turn replaces the user's information in the WHOIS and Registration Data Access Protocol (RDAP) with the information of a forwarding service (for email and sometimes postal mail, it is done by a proxy server).

Other sources say that domain privacy for companies is a nonsense, and may be seen a whois abuse in some cases. Only humans have privacy, companies don't. Corporations are economic players and the company name, address and registration number must remain public data in all cases. Hiding these prevents the identification of spammer domains, owners of profiling or harassing AI bots, etc. Therefore it hurts the privacy and legitim interest of humans that laws, like the GDPR in EU, are supposed to protect.

== Example ==
Here is an example of usage of domain privacy for the official website of voice actress Morgan Garrett, with Namecheap as registrar and Withheld for Privacy ehf as domain privacy service:

Domain name: morganlaure.com 
Registry Domain ID: 1560423577_DOMAIN_COM-VRSN 
Registrar WHOIS Server: whois.namecheap.com 
Registrar URL: http://www.namecheap.com 
Updated Date: 2025-05-27T08:54:42.04Z 
Creation Date: 2009-06-26T00:37:30.00Z 
Registrar Registration Expiration Date: 2026-06-26T00:37:30.00Z 
Registrar: NAMECHEAP INC 
Registrar IANA ID: 1068 
Registrar Abuse Contact Email: abuse@namecheap.com 
Registrar Abuse Contact Phone: +1.9854014545 
Reseller: NAMECHEAP INC 
Domain Status: clientTransferProhibited https://icann.org/epp#clientTransferProhibited 
Domain Status: RenewPeriod https://icann.org/epp#RenewPeriod 
Registry Registrant ID:  
Registrant Name: Redacted for Privacy 
Registrant Organization: Privacy service provided by Withheld for Privacy ehf 
Registrant Street: Kalkofnsvegur 2  
Registrant City: Reykjavik 
Registrant State/Province: Capital Region 
Registrant Postal Code: 101 
Registrant Country: IS 
Registrant Phone: +354.4212434 
Registrant Phone Ext:  
Registrant Fax:  
Registrant Fax Ext:  
Registrant Email: 5897ac9e449841dbb7d23ab91d70714b.protect@withheldforprivacy.com

== Level of anonymity ==
Registrars typically collect personal information to provide the service. Some registrars take little persuasion to release the so-called 'private' information to the world, requiring only a phone request or a cease and desist letter. Others, however, handle privacy with more precaution, using measures including hosting domain names offshore and accepting cryptocurrencies for payment so that the registrar has no knowledge of the domain name owner's personal information (which would otherwise be transmitted with credit card transactions). It is debatable whether or not this practice is at odds with the domain registration requirement of the Internet Corporation for Assigned Names and Numbers (ICANN).

=== Privacy by default ===
Some top-level domains have privacy caveats:

- .al: No information about the owner is disclosed.
- .at, .co.at, .or.at: Since May 21, 2010, contact data (defined as phone number, fax number, e-mail address) is hidden by the registrar and must be explicitly made public.
- .ca: Since June 10, 2008, the Canadian Internet Registration Authority no longer posts registration details of individuals associated with .ca domains.
- .ch and .li : Since 1st January 2021 Whois information is private by default and can be obtained only in limited cases
- .de: Since May 25, 2018, the German Internet Registration Authority DENIC put extensive changes into force for the Whois Lookup Service. With a few exceptions, third parties can no longer access domain ownership data.
- .eu: If the registrant is a natural person, only the e-mail address is shown in the public Whois records unless specified otherwise.
- .fi: Individual persons' data is not published (changed in 2019), but for companies, associations, etc., data is published.
- .fr: By default, individual domain name holders benefit from the restricted publishing of their personal data in the AFNIC public Whois.
- .it: Contact data of individuals is not published unless consent is given explicitly. For companies, data is always published. Proxy services are not allowed.
- .gr: No information about the owner is disclosed.
- .is: May hide address and phone number.
- .nl: Since January 12, 2010, registrant postal addresses are no longer publicly available.
- .ovh: Contact data is hidden by the registrar and must be explicitly made public.
- .uk: Nominet, the guardian of UK domain namespace, provide domain privacy tools on their extensions (.co.uk, .me.uk etc.), providing that the registrant is not trading from the domain name. While the home address of the registrant can be hidden, the full name cannot.
- .ro: No information about the owner is disclosed.

=== Privacy forbidden ===
- .au: Any Australian domain names ending with .au must not use a proxy service or privacy service due to auDA licensing rules. While most of the information are public, some of the information such as the street address, telephone and fax numbers of registrant is hidden.
- .br: As of April 2022, the domain registration contract requires the publication of name, email, country, and CPF number for all domains. Additionally, if the domain owned by a company, the company's phone number, address, and CNPJ number must also be public. Access to some of these details requires passing a CAPTCHA at whois.registro.br.
- .in: Registrants for Indian domain names may not use any proxy or privacy services provided by registrars.
- .us: In March 2005, the National Telecommunications and Information Administration (NTIA) said that owners of .us domains will not have the option of keeping their information private, and that it must be made public.

== Implications ==
The Internet Corporation for Assigned Names and Numbers (ICANN) broadly requires the mailing address, phone number, and e-mail address of those owning or administrating a domain name to be made publicly available through the WHOIS and Registration Data Directory Services (RDDS) for RDAP. However, that policy enables spammers, direct marketers, identity thieves, or other attackers to use the directory to acquire personal information about those people. Although ICANN has been working to change WHOIS to enable greater privacy, there is a lack of consensus among major stakeholders as to what type of change should be made. However, with the offer of private registration from many registrars, some of the risk has been mitigated. In addition, successor RDAP moved most contact information of domain name towards RDDS.

Researchers in the industry have worked on improving the design of the domain name system, in order to reduce the likelihood of attackers compromising the infrastructure. They have done so by allowing for varying options and adjusting the guidelines of how they operate.

== Litigation ==
With the help of "private registration", the service can be the legal owner of the domain. This has occasionally resulted in legal problems. Ownership of a domain name is given by the organization name of the owner contact in the domain's WHOIS record. There are typically four contact positions in a domain's WHOIS record: owner, administrator, billing, and technical. Some registrars will not shield the owner organization name in order to protect the ownership of the domain name.

There has been at least one lawsuit against Namecheap, Inc. for its role as owner/registrant; Namecheap lost its motion to dismiss. Silverstein v. Alivemax, et al. Los Angeles Superior Court Case Number BC480994 was dismissed in May 2014. Silverstein is well known for his anti-spam and email privacy campaigns, most notably in the case of William Silverstein v Keynetics, Inc., No. 17-15176 (9th Cir. 2018), but this was decided for Keynetics in March 2018.

Ownership of domains held by a privacy service was also an issue in the RegisterFly case, in which a registrar effectively ceased operations and then went bankrupt. Customers encountered serious difficulties in regaining control of the domains involved. ICANN has since remedied that situation by requiring all accredited registrars to maintain their customers' contact data in escrow. In the event a registrar loses its accreditation, gTLD domains, along with the escrowed contact data, will be transferred to another accredited registrar.

== See also ==
- Domain slamming
- Internet privacy
- Anonymity
