= Google Domains =

Domain registration service by Google

- Successor: Squarespace Domains
- Area served: Country list: Australia; Austria; Belgium; Brazil; Canada; France; Germany; India; Indonesia; Italy; Japan; Malaysia; Mexico; Netherlands; New Zealand; Philippines; Poland; Singapore; South Africa; Spain; Sweden; Switzerland; Thailand; Turkey; United Kingdom; United States; Vietnam
- Industry: Domain name registration
- Website: domains.google
- Commercial: Yes
- Launched: June 13, 2014
- Current status: Discontinued (September 7, 2023)

Availability of Google Domains

Google Domains was a domain name registrar and domain management service operated by Google. It was launched in 2014 and continued to operate, mostly as a beta service, until most of its assets were acquired by Squarespace on September 7, 2023. The sale included databases of registered domains, customer accounts, and registry accreditation.

== Features ==
The service offered domain registration, DNS hosting, dynamic DNS, domain forwarding, and email forwarding. It provided native integration support for Google Cloud DNS and Google Workspace. It also offered one-click DNS configuration that connected the domains with Blogger, Google Sites, Squarespace, Wix.com, Weebly, Bluehost, Shopify, and Firebase. It supports domain privacy, custom nameservers, and DNSSEC.

The domain registration service was accredited by ICANN – the IANA number assigned by ICANN to Google LLC was 895. This number was transferred to Squarespace after the sale in September 2023.

== History ==
Google became a domain name registrar in 2005. Google Domains was publicly launched under a beta test mode on January 13, 2015.

In March 2022, Google announced that Google Domains was officially out of beta. It supported more than 300 top-level domains at that time.

On September 7, 2023, all Google Domains assets—including all customer accounts and approximately 10 million registered domain names—were acquired by Squarespace for about $180 million. Squarespace announced it would transfer existing domains to its Squarespace Domains platform after a transition period. On the same day, Google Domains stopped accepting new domain registrations (selling new domains) and started recommending users to use Squarespace directly. All domains had been migrated to Squarespace by July 10, 2024.
