= Slamming (disambiguation) =

Slamming is the impact of the bottom structure of a ship onto the sea surface.

Slamming may also refer to:

- Intravenous drug use
- Telephone slamming, a telecommunications scam
- Domain slamming, an Internet domain name scam
- Poetry slamming, a kind of competition for poets
