= Internet Provider Security =

Naming convention

Internet Provider Security (IPS) tags are used by domain registrar to administer a domain name registration service and related Domain Name System (DNS) services. An IPS tag is the label that applies to each registrar that registers domains in the country-code top-level domain uk and is required to transfer domain names from one registrar to another.

The original meaning of IPS tag was thought to be lost after it was created with Nominet UK's predecessor, the Naming Committee; it is widely speculated that it stands for Internet Provider Security tag. The term IPS tag itself is considered obsolete by Nominet UK, and is now referred to simply as tag. However, there are also records of those involved in the early internet industry who believe it was a typo of the initialism for Internet service provider made by an unnamed junior systems administrator, ISPs being the main bodies responsible for registering domains in the early years of the commercial internet. The identity of the engineer making the typo is known but the identity is not currently referenced on the web.

Transferring a domain name from one registrar to another requires the original registrar to change the IPS tag to that of the new registrar. Domain name owners can often, but not always, change this tag themselves in the respective domain management control panels.

It is possible to change the IPS tag via the Nominet website. The cost for this feature is £10+VAT.
