= .nrw =

Top-level domain for North Rhine-Westphalia, Germany

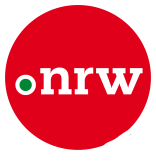
- Introduced: 2014
- TLD type: GeoTLD
- Registry: MINDS + MACHINES GmbH
- Intended use: North Rhine-Westphalia residents, institutions, and businesses
- Documents: Registration policies
- Dispute policies: UDRP
- DNSSEC: Yes
- Registry website: domains.nrw

.nrw is a top-level domain (TLD) that represents the German state of North Rhine-Westphalia. The official introduction took place on March 24, 2015. and is currently managed by dotNRW GmbH. Although anyone can register for the domain, it is primarily intended for businesses and organizations based in North Rhine-Westphalia.

== About ==
The .nrw domain is becoming increasingly popular, and it is now commonly used for marketing campaigns, events, and other initiatives. The dotNRW GmbH manages the domain and provides a range of services and support to its users. The top-level domain has been free for citizens and companies to use since March 2015.

== Usage ==
The government website open.nrw was the first website to use the new extension. Around 19,500 .nrw domains have been registered as of 2020.

== See also ==
- .de
- .cologne
- .koeln
