= Auth-Code =

Randomly generated complex code

An Auth-Code, also known as an EPP code, authorization code, transfer code, or Auth-Info Code, is a generated passcode required to transfer an Internet domain name between domain registrars; the code is intended to indicate that the domain name owner has authorized the transfer.

Auth-Codes are created by the current registrar of the domain. The registrar is required to provide the Auth-Code to the domain name owner within five calendar days of the owner's request, and ICANN accepts complaints about registrars that do not. Some registrars allow Auth-Codes to be generated by the domain owners through the registrar's website. All Generic top-level domains use an Auth-Code in their transfer process.

The .nz domain registry used an eight-character Auth-Code called Unique Domain Authentication Identifier (UDAI) for domain transfers and name conflict procedures. The UDAI was provided to the domain owner by the domain's current registrar, and expired after 30 days. With the .nz registry update in 2022 the term UDAI was retired, and the passcode is now also referred to as an Auth-Code.

== Alternative systems ==
The .uk and .co.uk domain registry, instead of using a passcode, has the domain owner specify the new registrar using the old registrar. The destination registrar is specified using the destination's registrar tag, also known as an Internet Provider Security (IPS) tag or Nominet Provider tag.

Some registries use a document based approach either in conjunction with or instead of an Auth-Code. An example for that is .hu for which the registrant has to fill out a document and send it to the new registrar, who sends it to the registry to fulfill the domain transfer.

The .is domain registry uses the domain admin's NIC handle, and the old registrar has to update it to the new registrar's NIC handle.

Some other registries use an email template (that may or may not be in part processed automatically) like .lr or .jm. In this case the technical contact is set to the registrar and can be updated by sending an updated template from the registrant or admin contacts email address.

== See also ==
- Domain lock — another attribute of a domain registration to prevent unauthorized domain transfers and other domain name scams
- Extensible Provisioning Protocol (EPP) — protocol used by a large number of domain registries and registrars to communicate domain changes
