= UKDomains =

UKDomains was formed in 1996 and was one of the first companies within the United Kingdom to start registering Internet domain names. As the ninth registered member and TAG holder of Nominet (the.uk registry), UKDomains provides a wide range of second-level domains such as.co.uk,.org.uk, and.me.uk domain names. The biggest-selling second level domain in the UK supplied by Nominet is the.co.uk domain, which is intended for use by commercial enterprises and businesses.

In addition, UKDomains went on to supply top-level domain names which are managed by ICANN. Domains such as.com,.net, and.org

As one of the UK's largest web hosting companies, it has data centre facilities in London and Farnham. Its UK headquarters are in the Arena Business Centre, at Holy Rood Close, Poole, BH17 7BA.

Not all.uk names are provided by Nominet. Joint Academic NETwork provides ac.uk and gov.uk.

There are certain rules regarding the domain registrations with Nominet that differ considerably between the SLDs.

Nominet has been praised for its organization when compared with other registration authorities.
