= Slamming Bill =

Proposed US law concerning spam

Slamming Bill (Anti-slamming Amendments Act, S. 1618) was a bill proposed in the United States Senate in 1998. It never passed. This bill is often mentioned by spammers in order to give a false impression that their spam is legal.

== Bill ==
The bill originally dealt with telephone slamming. Some of its editions contained a controversial part that required senders of unsolicited email to include their name, electronic and physical address, and telephone number at the beginning of the message, and also to include "a statement that further transmissions of such mail to the recipient by the person may be stopped at no cost to the recipient by sending a reply to the originating electronic mail address with the word "remove" in the subject line".

A bill must be passed by both Senate and House to become a law. One edition of the bill was passed by the Senate but not the House. Another edition was passed by the House but not the Senate, and only after this controversial part had been discarded due to public protests.

Therefore, the bill is not a law.

== Why the spammers' claim is incorrect ==
- The bill is not a law, since it never passed both Senate and House.
- Most spammers violate the bill because they don't provide their email addresses, real names, addresses and phone numbers in the beginning of their messages.
- Some spammers mention Section 301, Paragraph (a)(2)(C). This refers to the edition proposed by the House. But in this edition, the whole Section 301, Paragraph (a)(2) had been dropped due to public protests.
- Some spammers mention the bill when sending messages from outside the United States to recipients who are also outside the United States. In these cases it is often changed to something like an "international regulation", to make the claim look less obviously bogus.

== Problems with the bill ==
- It would greatly increase the time wasted on mass unsolicited email. It is much faster to delete 10 spam messages than to reply on each one with the "remove" word and then delete them.
- By getting the "remove" reply, spammers would know that the address is in active use, and could send more spam or sell it to other spammers.
- For these reasons, many users wouldn't reply email messages with the "remove" word. Unsolicited emailers would be able to send them any number of commercial advertisement and still claim that they comply the law.
- This law permitted anyone to send one unsolicited email to any number of users.
