= Mira Mariah =

Mira Mariah is a fashion designer, illustrator, and tattoo artist. She is best known for her inclusive feminist tattoos and for tattooing celebrities such as Ariana Grande, Ilana Glazer, and Pete Davidson.

== Early life and education ==
Mariah grew up in Long Island and frequently travelled to New York City. When she was 17 years old, Mariah amputated her leg due to a staph infection after corrective surgery from a birth defect.

Mariah earned a degree in fashion design from the Fashion design student at the Fashion Institute of Technology in New York City.

== Career ==
Mariah left her job as an assistant fashion designer in 2014 after she was unable to think of a tattoo artist that could represent "an expressive, modern generation of women" and began a tattoo apprenticeship that she found on Craigslist.

She grew a following by tattooing fashion influencers and became more well known after tattooing Ariana Grande with a worker bee tattoo in remembrance of the victims lost in the Manchester Arena bombing.

Mariah has gained notoriety for fine-line, feminist tattoos that are inclusive to plus-sized women, mothers and disabled women.

== Collaborations ==
Mariah frequently participates in partnerships and collaborations. Some of her partnerships include MeUndies, Squarespace, Inkbox, Shondaland and Netflix's Bridgerton, and Apotheke.
