= Brandon Gray Internet Services =

Company perpetrating domain name scams

- Company type: Private
- Headquarters: Markham, Ontario, Canada
- Products: Domain registrar
- Website: namejuice.com

Brandon Gray Internet Services, Inc., doing business as "NameJuice.com," is an ICANN accredited domain name registry operator based in Markham, Ontario. The company is in the business of registering, renewing and transferring Internet domains and subdomains. The company and its resellers have become notorious for domain name scams.

In December 2003, the Federal Trade Commission requested that the U.S. District Court for the Southern District of New York issue an injunction against one of the company's resellers, Domain Registry of America, for making misrepresentations in the sale of its domain registry services through a practice known as domain slamming. The FTC alleged that the company sent mass-marketed direct mail that resembled expiry or renewal notices, urging U.S. consumers to act to avoid deletion and soliciting them to transfer their domain name registrations from their current registrar. The FTC asked the court to order full refunds for the company's 50,000 customers, to require the company to pay each customer $6 to help cover the cost of transferring to a new registrar, and to place the company under strict government monitoring.

In July 2014, ICANN sent a Notice of Suspension of Registrar’s Ability to Create New Registered Names or Initiate Inbound Transfers of Registered Names to Brandon Gray Internet Services, barring the company from registering domains for 90 days. Pursuant to Section 5.5.6 of the Registrar Accreditation Agreement (RAA), the company had been in fundamental and material breach of its obligations under the RAA at least three times within a twelve-month period. The suspension was in effect from August 12, 2014, to October 17, 2014.
