= Box Office India =

Website providing box office results for Hindi films

- Website type: Film
- Available in: English
- Website: www.boxofficeindia.com
- Commercial: Yes
- Registration: Required
- Launched: 10 June 2003
- Current status: Active

Box Office India is an Indian film website dedicated to tracking, reporting, and analyzing the financial performance of films released in the Hindi entertainment industry.

Established in 2003, Box Office India has become a prominent source of data and insights regarding box office revenues, viewership trends, and industry analyses within the Bollywood industry and other regional cinema in India. The website serves as a comprehensive source for box office statistics, including daily, weekly, and lifetime earnings of films across various Indian languages. Its traffic ranking in India is 83,665 as of 10 July 2021, and is frequently visited by other countries such as Pakistan, Bangladesh, and Nepal. Its site does not include collections from dubbed Telugu, Tamil, or Kannada versions of Bollywood films and vice-versa, nor does it include overseas collections from Far Eastern or Russian markets.

A new Box Office India website went live on 20 January 2014.

== About ==
Box Office India was launched on 10 June 2003. Its uses Whois privacy to anonymize its owner. Other than India, it is frequently visited in Pakistan, Bangladesh, Nepal, and other countries where the Indian Hindi-language films are popular in Bollywood. It receives an average 83,854-page views per day and earns around $7,547 monthly from ad revenues. Box Office India's estimated net worth is around $183,641 as of December 2012. It has website backlinks from around 350 websites. It has been used by some leading newspapers as reference.

== Box Office reports ==
Box Office India provides information of box office results for domestic and overseas collections of Hindi films. The website updates box office reports on a regular basis with territorial breakdown of domestic figures and top earners by decade and all time records.

The site does not include collections from dubbed Telugu, Tamil, or Kannada versions of Bollywood films and vice-versa. The site also does not include overseas collections from Far Eastern or Russian markets.

== See also ==
- List of highest-grossing Indian films
