= Registry lock =

Safeguard to protect a domain name

A registry lock is an Internet domain name security service that prevents unauthorized changes, transfers, or deletions at the domain registry level until the lock is lifted through a verified authorization process.

== Introduction ==
When set, the following actions are prohibited by the domain name registry:

- Modification of the domain name, including:
  - Transferring of the domain name
  - Deletion of the domain name
- Modification of the domain contact details

Renewal of the domain name is, however, still possible when registry lock is set.

Not all Top-level domains (TLDs) support registry lock.

The .ca TLD added support for registry lock in October 2010.

RFC 2832, section 6, and RFC 3632, section 2.1, lists the different status codes and their descriptions.

When a domain name is protected by registry lock at the registry level the domain name will have the status code "ServerUpdateProhibited", "ServerTransferProhibited", and/or "ServerDeleteProhibited".

== Registrar lock ==
A registrar lock is not the same as a registry lock.

When a domain name is protected by a registrar lock, the domain name will have the status code "ClientUpdateProhibited", "ClientTransferProhibited", and/or "ClientDeleteProhibited". The status codes of domain name can be found using the WHOIS system.

A registrar lock is a security feature implemented at the registry level that is used to prevent unauthorized changes to a domain name. When a domain name has been locked at the registry, an agent of the sponsoring registrar must transmit a request to the registry to unlock the domain name. The agent of the sponsoring registrar requesting that the domain name be unlocked is subsequently contacted via a phone call by the registry and required to provide a secret passphrase over the phone for the domain name to be unlocked. This is an added layer of security that can be used to protect strategic domain names.

== See also ==
- Domain privacy
- Domain slamming
- Transfer secret
