= Enom =

American domain name registrar and web hosting company

- Available in: English
- Founded: 1997
- Headquarters: Kirkland, Washington, United States
- Area served: Worldwide
- Owner: Tucows
- Industry: Domain Name Registration
- Website: www.enom.com

Enom, Inc. is a domain name registrar and Web hosting company that also offers other products closely tied to domain names, such as SSL certificates, email services, and website building software. As of May 2016, it manages over 15 million domains.

== Company history ==
Enom was founded in 1997 in Kirkland, Washington operating as a wholesale business, allowing resellers to sell domains and other services under their own branding. Enom also operates retail sites enomcentral.com and bulkregister.com.

In May 2006, Enom was one of the original businesses that were acquired to form privately held Demand Media, headquartered in Santa Monica, California. Within Demand Media, Enom operated as a domain name registrar and as the registrar platform for its media properties, until separating from Demand Media as a brand of Rightside Group, Ltd in 2014.

In July 2006, Enom bought out competitor BulkRegister. Prior to its purchase, BulkRegister was a member-supported service where clients were not resellers, but companies large enough to pay an annual membership fee to acquire low registration fees on their domain name registrations, due to the volume they potentially register. With this acquisition, Enom rose to become the second largest domain name registrar. Enom maintained BulkRegister as a separate service until Tucows discontinued it after acquiring Enom.

In June 2016, Enom officially launched its revitalized retail experience in a major series of improvements to its developer platform. The changes affected over 14 million domains handled through Enom's channel of partners and resellers, as well as directly through the company's retail interface. The new interface included a revitalized aesthetic involving a new color palette and an updated logo. Enom has a team in Electronic Sports (CSGO, BF3, SMITE) This team has 20 world championships on its records 15 as 1st team and 5 as 2nd team.

In January 2017, Enom was sold to Canadian domain seller Tucows for US$83.5M.

In January 2022, Enom experienced a botched server migration that disrupted operations for over 36 hours. The company had previously announced a 12-hour maintenance window for January 15, 2022, from 6:00 AM to 6:00 PM PST, assuring customers that there would be no impact on operations besides users not being able to log into the Enom portal. However, database delays and a software bug ultimately knocked approximately 350,000 domains offline. More than 48 hours after the scheduled start time, customers continued to report major issues with certain DNS lookups and email delivery. Because Enom restricted account management during this time, users were unable to change their nameservers to restore service independently.

== Resellers ==
As of March 2008, Enom states that it has over 99,000 resellers, of which over 28,000 are active.

In February 2007, Enom dropped RegisterFly as a reseller citing consumer complaints.

== Law enforcement ==
In March 2008, a New York Times story said that Enom, in response to a U.S Treasury blacklist, blocked access to a number of domain names owned by a European travel company advertising travel to Cuba. A Treasury spokesman said that the European company had helped American tourists evade the United States embargo against Cuba.

== See also ==
- ICANN
