= SWIP =

SWIP, SWiP or Swip can refer to:

- A-6E Intruder aircraft Systems/Weapons Improvement Program
- Scottish Widows Investment Partnership
- Shared Whois Project
- Society for Women in Philosophy
- Swiss Innovation Pool Inc.
