= Minimum Rate Pricing =

Minimum Rate Pricing, Inc. (MRP) was a long-distance telecommunications carrier, based out of Cedar Grove, New Jersey, started by Thomas Salzano.

Minimum Rate Pricing became the number 7 long-distance carrier in the United States within four years from its start-up, with over 1.9 million long-distance customers in 1998.

Minimum Rate Pricing was accused of slamming customers (changing rate plans without notice). Under a consent decree agreement with the Federal Communications Commission (FCC), Minimum Rate Pricing agreed to voluntarily pay $1.2 million to the FCC in a settlement without any admission of liability.

Minimum Rate Pricing subsequently eliminated its switch-back provisions, but the FCC continued its investigation into other slamming-related issues concerning Minimum Rate Pricing's business and marketing practices.

The company went bankrupt in 1999, owing WorldCom and Access Capital $67 million. Thomas Salzano later started Norvergence with his brother, Peter Salzano which also went bankrupt, amid widespread charges of fraud.

== See also ==
Norvergence
