= Private sub-domain registry =

A private subdomain registry allocates domain names in a subset of the Domain Name System under a domain registered with an ICANN-accredited or ccTLD registry. Most of the private subdomain registries operate based on an ISO 3166-1 name that is a subdomain of a higher-level domain. It operates below the DNS root and therefore is not a top‑level domain (TLD).

Some of these registries combine the domain registry and the domain registrar functions in the administration structure, while others distribute domains via third-party registrars.

== Operation ==
Private registries operate at a technical level identical to official domain registries using the well-known principles of operation of the Domain Name System. In addition, the registries may also operate a WHOIS service to publish domain name information.

== History ==
The idea for an independent global domain name registry stems from a series of conversations between one of CentralNic's original founders and the late Jon Postel, one of the founding fathers of the modern Internet. Postel suggested the use of .UK.COM to compete with .CO.UK, at a time when the proposed price of the latter was about $300.

After the use of UK.COM, other ISO Country codes ending in .COM were also established such as AU.COM (Australia) and HK.COM (Hong Kong) and many other countries. In 2011, CentralNic established the country code second-level domain .COM.DE. Even though that domain is very similar to official ccSLDs, like COM.AU or COM.PL, it has no official status since it is not operated by Denic, the official registry service provider of .DE domains.

== See also ==
- Domain registrar
- Domain registry
- ICANN
