= RegisterFly =

US based internet hosting and domain name registrar

- Type: Private
- Industry: Domain registrar
- Founded: 2000
- Headquarters: 404 Main St. Boonton, New Jersey
- Key people: John Naruszewicz, Kevin Medina
- Products: Domain names
- Website: www.registerfly.com

RegisterFly was a New Jersey (U.S.) based internet hosting service and domain registrar that had their ICANN-accredited status terminated in March 2007.

== History ==
RegisterFly formerly acted as a reseller of the services of eNom, but became an accredited registrar in its own right in 2006 through the acquisition of "Top Class Names" sold to the company by Directi with Bhavin Turakhia completing the asset transfer. By February 2007, the company was registrar for approximately 2,000,000 domain names held by about 900,000 customers. Notable clients of RegisterFly included the government of Thailand, the Easter Seals charity, and pop star Michael Jackson. In 2007, ICANN launched an investigation of RegisterFly amid allegations of fraud. No lawsuits were initially filed between the governing domain body and the company; however, there was during this time a lawsuit between the company's two owners, CEO John Naruszewicz and Kevin Medina. RegisterFly's website went offline for a time, causing serious concern amongst registrant customers of RegisterFly.

One user's support ticket history, including tickets closed without resolution.

The incidents and lawsuit that then followed were the result of a feud between RegisterFly co-owners Kevin Medina and John Naruszewicz, who were at once both business and intimate partners. As problems at RegisterFly gained momentum, their ten-year-long business and romantic relationship abruptly came to an end. The lawsuit between the former partners alleged, among other matters, that Medina misappropriated corporate funds for personal use. However, the court ruled on March 8, 2007, in favor of Medina, stating that Naruszewicz had no ownership over RegisterFly. Medina resumed control over RegisterFly, but not before Naruszewicz published a public apology to customers on the company's web page.

On March 28, 2007, U.S. District Court Judge William Osteen unsealed a class action lawsuit filed by Attorney E. Clarke Dummit against RegisterFly, eNom, and ICANN. The lawsuit alleges that RegisterFly systematically defrauded customers attempting to register or renew Internet domain names.

Due to the reported negligence of RegisterFly in protecting its customers, angry calls have arisen for oversight of the domain registrar industry. On March 16, 2007, ICANN publicly announced that Registerfly will cease operating as an ICANN-Accredited Registrar on March 31, 2007. ICANN officially removed Registerfly's accreditation on March 31, 2007 and ordered Registerfly to cease operation and remove the ICANN logo from Registerfly's website. However, Kevin Medina invoked the arbitration clause in the registrar's accreditation agreement which allows him to continue to operate as a domain name registrar through an arbitration process laid out in the contract.

On April 17, 2007, a federal judge granted a temporary restraining order to ICANN, compelling Registerfly to turn over all registration data within 48 hours and to update it every seven days. Medina failed to do so, and ICANN was granted a civil contempt order against Registerfly on May 9, 2007, compelling Registerfly to comply with the preliminary injunction. Because Kevin Medina failed to show up for the hearings, the judge issued a show cause why Medina should not be found personally in contempt of court on May 16, and ordered another hearing for May 25, 2007. Kevin Medina appeared in court on May 25, 2007, and was found personally in contempt for not complying with the previous orders. The temporary restraining order was made permanent. He was given 48 hours to post a notice on his website stating that Registerfly's accreditation had been terminated, and until June 1, 2007 to give ICANN all registrant data. Registerfly could be fined $5,000 USD a day for failure to do so. Registerfly initially posted the required ICANN notice in the help section of their website; however, the notice did not meet all of the order's requirements, especially as to placement on the top one-third of every page in a fourteen-point bold typeface. RegisterFly has since printed the required notice on its home page.

== Ownership lawsuit ==
In February 2007 eNom formally severed ties with RegisterFly over continued consumer complaints. John Naruszewicz, a co-owner of RegisterFly, filed suit against his business partner, CEO Kevin Medina (they each were thought to have owned 50% of the company). Medina was fired by RegisterFly, reportedly over civil liabilities relating to allegations of funds mismanagement but Medina and Naruszewicz continued to dispute legal control over the company. Meanwhile, RegisterFly filed suit against Kevin Medina, alleging he had stolen company funds for a $27,000 male escort service, a $6,000 liposuction procedure, a $10,000/month penthouse apartment in Miami, Florida and a $6,000 chihuahua dog. This alleged misappropriation of funds, along with Medina's lavish spending, was said to have caused the company's woes. Court documents claim over 75,000 customer domain names were forfeited by RegisterFly.com in one month alone because of the company's failure to pay registration fees. RegisterFly management also claimed that Medina deleted passwords and access to billing system information to prevent the issuing of customer refunds. However, Medina reportedly accused his ex-lover Naruzewicz of spending $60,000 in company funds on Moroccan furniture for the corporate office.

=== Website split and court ruling ===
In early March 2007 two competing and visually similar versions of the RegisterFly website were online. Naruszewicz had taken over control of RegisterFly.com; and RegisterFly.net was set up by and under Medina's management, each through separate service providers. On March 7, 2007, reports emerged that Registerfly.net was effectively a phishing site gathering credit card sales but not providing a product or service. Customers were urged to avoid all business with RegisterFly.net, and immediately, to change their passwords via RegisterFly.com, since even though the websites were separate, Medina still had a duplicate of all account information.

On March 8, 2007, then-CEO John Naruszewicz made an official announcement that having regained control of the website, he would begin rectifying payment problems and recovering lost domains. Later the same day, United States district court Judge Peter Sheridan ordered that legal control of RegisterFly be returned to an official ownership state as of December 17, 2006, when, at this time it was discovered that Medina never correctly filed proper ownership agreements and they were being drawn up and discussed. This ruling essentially allowed Naruszewicz to forfeit any claim to Registerfly, with Medina being the sole owner and fully responsible for all company affairs. After the ruling, Medina said “This decision puts me back in the driver's seat. I believe I have built a lot of customers that will weather the storm.” Without Naruszewicz at the helm, all Registerfly employees tendered their resignation on the same day as Medina's court victory. This was one of the final nails in the coffin for this company.

Naruszewicz said he would not appeal the judge's ruling and stated, “We lost and it's all over. The company will implode in days and 1 million domain names are going to be lost. It's a damned shame.”

== ICANN and customer complaints ==
ICANN had received many customer complaints about RegisterFly. There were allegations of fraud dating back to 2004, including reports RegisterFly had suspended customer accounts and domain names in retaliation for complaints about overcharging. Kevin Medina also reportedly used the fake alias of "Tim Shor". eNom and ICANN also accused RegisterFly of inappropriately altering clients' WHOIS data. Complaints about RegisterFly were issued by other ICANN-accredited registrars, ICANN board members and the United States Department of Commerce.

On February 22, 2007 ICANN notified RegisterFly they would lose their accreditation as a domain registrar if certain issues were not corrected. News sources reported that as of February 19, 2007 RegisterFly had suspended all business contact including e-mail, telephone and fax communications. Meanwhile, ICANN was also the subject of criticism over their handling of RegisterFly's problems, with allegations of a “laissez faire attitude toward customer allegations of fraud”.

=== ICANN lawsuit and domain restrictions ===
On March 4, 2007 (a Sunday) ICANN announced it would file suit against RegisterFly in United States federal court the following March 6 for failing to comply with an audit as required by their Registrar Accreditation Agreement (RAA). However, ICANN deferred the suit after RegisterFly provided ICANN with minimum registrant information. ICANN also convinced several top-level domain registries who administer the .com, .net, .biz and .info namespaces, including VeriSign, NeuStar and Afilias to restrict pending-expiration Registerfly domains into a so-called “Server-Delete-Prohibited” status. ICANN stated, “This will prevent them from being deleted from the registry and becoming available for re-registration by others.”

=== .be domains ===
In 2005...2006, RegisterFly was the main registrar of .be domains (Belgium). This is due to various promotional zero-dollar offers for .be domains by RegisterFly during 2005 and probably until late 2006. A significant part of the RegisterFly domain data base included .be domains. While the exact number can not be specified at this time, the number is supposed to be between 100 000 and 300 000 .be domains. When customers tried to renew such domains, the money was drawn from their credit card but domain renewal did not take place. So in their RegisterFly customer account, their domain was marked as renewed, while the Belgium ccTLD registry for these domains had already made them available for new domain registrants. The Belgian ccTLD registry equivalent refused to apply to these domains the status “Server-Delete-Prohibited”, as this function was not provided in the registries processes. This refusal was the answer for the corresponding request for various .be domains, for example for the domain notenverga.be ("rating...", related to the German site http://vox7.com = rating of election candidates.) - So while ICANN coordinated some kind of protection, the registrants of .be domain had the risk to definitely lose their domains in case of some marketing value (high visitor frequence) to domain hunters.

=== Termination of ICANN accreditation ===
On March 16, 2007, ICANN informed Registerfly that it would cease operating as an ICANN-Accredited Registrar on March 31, 2007, and also ordered RegisterFly to immediately cease using the ICANN logo and trademarks on their website.

“Terminating accreditation is the strongest measure ICANN is able to take against RegisterFly under its powers. ICANN has been frustrated and distressed by recent management confusion inside RegisterFly. Completely understand the greater frustration and enormous difficulty that this has created for registrants.” Dr. Paul Twomey, President and CEO of ICANN was quoted as saying. Twomey also called on RegisterFly to immediately initiate a “bulk transfer” (migrating or moving multiple names at one time) of all their domain names to another registrar, to protect the interests of their remaining clients.

On April 27, a US Judge ruled that ICANN could terminate RegisterFly's accreditation immediately.

=== Effects on industry due to RegisterFly collapse ===
In the wake of and in response to RegisterFly's collapse, ICANN is planning to reform the entire domain registration and registrar accreditation process. President and CEO of ICANN, Dr. Paul Twomey, stated:

What has happened to registrants with RegisterFly.com has made it clear there must be comprehensive review of the registrar accreditation process and the content of the RAA. This is going to be a key debate at our Lisbon meeting scheduled for 26–30 March 2007. There must be clear decisions made on changes. As a community we cannot put this off. ICANN introduced competition to the domain name market in 1998. Back then there was one registrar. There are now over 865. That's a good thing because it has made domain names cheaper and offered more choice. But the RAA was designed and signed when the domain name market was much smaller. The market now supports about 70 million generic TLD names and is growing. Registrants suffer most from weaknesses in the RAA and I want to make sure that ICANN's accreditation process and our agreement gives us the ability to respond more strongly and flexibly in the future.

== Independent help for customers ==
For customers of RegisterFly the court ruling was exacerbated by reports that Medina's credit card provider Humboldt was terminating their services. Many customers had learned of these problems only after having failed in routine online attempts to renew or transfer domain names or pay for services via credit card. The support website registerflies.com, which had been set up in 2005 for the purpose of providing independent support and information to disgruntled RegisterFly customers, was providing information on recovering domain names lost by RegisterFly. Also, they have called for domain name registrants to contact the Florida attorney general.

RegisterFly was ordered by ICANN to provide its database of registrant information to them, including the owners of domain names and their contact details. ICANN reportedly received the data on March 7 and found that the data was deficient and inaccurate. On April 17, 2007 A Federal judge granted a temporary restraining order to ICANN compelling Registerfly to turn over all registration data and to update it every seven days.

Because of the current operational problems at the RegisterFly website, ProtectFly in many instances can not be turned off, or turning it off has no effect, which has caused customers more difficulties. Valentino Viccetzar, a writer for the web blog Poker Rouge Blog, was reported to have found a 15-step work-around solution for customers. This technique became known as the 'poker push', but in many instances failed to work, and customers were forced to try to find remedies with Registerfly.

Customers continued to report that they were unable to get support through the Registerfly support system as their telephone support involved multiple hour wait times, support tickets were ignored or deleted, and that emails went unanswered. A few customers were able to resolve problems. However, sometime in the middle of May 2007 the Registerfly support telephone numbers were disconnected.

There is no way for disenfranchised customers to recover funds remaining in their accounts. As of April 2, 2008, customer support states "We do not refund quick checkout balances... This policy is without exception."

== Portfolio buyout ==
On May 29, 2007 GoDaddy, announced that through an agreement with RegisterFly, it was taking over the entire portfolio of more than 855,000 generic top-level domain (gTLD) names held by RegisterFly. The names would move to newly created accounts at GoDaddy, and they would notify Registerfly customers by email. GoDaddy and ICANN will not release terms of the agreement but have said that GoDaddy is not buying Registerfly. ICANN plans to continue legal action against Registerfly for its continued noncompliance of the court ordered injunction.

== Bankruptcy hearings ==
A hearing in Newark, New Jersey in December 2007 discussed that the company would be executing what is known as an "assignment for the benefit of creditors." This is usually a state-court equivalent to a bankruptcy case in which a company's assets are gathered by a third-party, liquidated, then distributed to the company's creditors in proportion to the company's debt to each of the creditors.
