= .koeln =

Internet top-level domain for Cologne, Germany

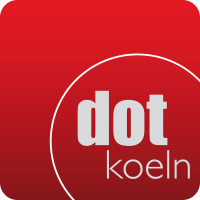
- Introduced: 2014
- TLD type: GeoTLD
- Registry: RyCE GmbH
- Sponsor: dotKoeln GmbH
- Intended use: Cologne residents, institutions, and businesses
- Documents: Registration policies
- Dispute policies: UDRP
- DNSSEC: Yes
- Registry website: nic.koeln

.koeln and .cologne are geographic top-level domains for Cologne, Germany in the Domain Name System of the Internet. They were officially launched in 2014.

== See also ==
- .de
