= Domain name scam =

Cybercrime

Domain name scams include a range of fraudulent schemes where scammers trick domain registrants into buying, selling, listing, or transferring a domain name. Scammers target victims in a variety of ways, often through fake urgent renewal invoices from domain registrars not affiliated with the domain to charge high renewal fees, by requesting that domain sellers pay costly appraisals to finalize a sale that doesn't exist, or by using fake trademark infringement claims to threaten a domain owner into transfer their domain name.

== Domain slamming ==
Domain slamming, a term derived from telephone slamming, is a scam in which a domain registrar attempts to deceive a domain registrant into switching from their current registrar. Scammers frequently use WHOIS data to obtain the registrant's email address, phone number, and mailing address, then contact the owner claiming their domain is about to expire and must be renewed urgently to avoid deletion. Victims who transfer their domains pay up to 3 times the price of a standard domain renewal.

In 2004, ICANN, the domain name governing body, made changes to its policy for transferring domains between registrars. They introduced a single protective measure that can help prevent unauthorized transfers: domain locking. Critics, although advising owners to apply the new feature, said that this was an "unnecessary and customer-unfriendly change" as the new rules also included a provision that domains without locks would have transfer requests automatically approved after five days without a response from the administrator, whereas previously administrators were required to approve the transfer manually within five days.

== Aftermarket scams ==
Domain appraisal scams target aftermarket domain name sellers. A scammer poses as a potential buyer and offers to purchase the domain name for a significant sum. However, the buyer insists that the seller first obtain an appraisal from a specific company. The prospect of a large payout makes the appraisal fee appear insignificant by comparison. After the seller pays for the appraisal and receives the report, the supposed buyer ceases communication. Sellers can protect themselves from this scam by being cautious of offers that seem too good to be true, especially when there’s little or no attempt to negotiate, and to never pay for a domain appraisal at the buyer’s request. Instead, sellers should insist that the buyer cover the cost.

Domain auction scams target aftermarket domain name buyers. A scammer lists a domain name on an auction platform and promotes the listing on forums and social media, claiming to have received a significant offer. They state that the winning bidder simply needs to close the deal, then profit on the price difference. Scammers may include a doctored image of the offer email to make the claim more convincing. Additionally, they may engage in shill bidding to drive up the price. The victim often ends up paying a substantial amount for a worthless domain, only to later discover that the offer never existed.

== Fake trademark protection ==
Although less common than domain slamming, another domain name scam primarily coming from registrars based in China involves sending domain owners an e-mail claiming that another company has just attempted to register a number of domains with them which contain the targeted domain owner's trademark or has many keyword similarities to their existing domain name. Often, these domains will be the same as the one(s) owned by the targeted individual but with different top-level domains (TLDs). The scammer will claim to have halted the bulk registration in order to protect the targeted individual's intellectual property, and if the email recipient doesn't recognize the entity attempting to register these domain names, that they should respond immediately to protect their trademark. If the scam target does respond by email or by phone, the scammer will then try to get them to register these domain names for several years upfront with the registrar running this scam.

Other variations of this type of scam include registrars that target their own existing customers with similar made-up threats of another entity trying to register the same domain as theirs under different TLDs. As well, some domainers are known to search for available TLDs for already registered domains, then emailing the owner of the registered domain and offering to sell the unregistered variations to them for a marked up amount. If the target agrees to the deal, the domainer will then purchase the domains on the spot for the regular $7~20 registration fee and immediately sell it back to the victim for a few hundred dollars.

== See also ==
- Copyfraud
- List of confidence tricks § Online scams
- Scams in intellectual property
- Telephone slamming
- Transfer secret

== Notes ==
1.^{a} ^{b} ^{c} ^{d} ^{e} ^{f} ^{g} ^{h} ^{i} Entities and resellers associated with Brandon Gray include Namejuice.com, Domain Registry of America, Domain Renewal Group, Domain Registry of Australia, Domain Registry of Canada, Domain Registry of Europe, Internet Registry of Canada, Liberty Names of America, Registration Services Inc, Yellow Business.ca and Internet Corporation Listing Service.
