= .ruhr =

Top-level domain for Ruhr, Germany

- Introduced: 25 November 2013
- Intended use: Ruhr residents, institutions, and businesses
- Actual use: Used by residents, and businesses in the Ruhr area
- Dispute policies: UDRP
- DNSSEC: Yes
- Registry website: dot.ruhr

.ruhr is a geographic top-level domain for the Ruhr area in Germany in the Domain Name System of the Internet. It launched in November of 2013.

== See also ==
- .de
- .saarland
