= Unfold (app) =

Social mobile application

- Original author: Alfonso Cobo
- Release: 2018
- Available in: English
- Website: unfold.com

Unfold is a mobile application that allows users to create social media content using a variety of templates and other tools. It was founded in 2018 by Alfonso Cobo and Andy McCune. It enables users to add photos, video, and text with a variety of tools. In 2019, Unfold was acquired by Squarespace.

== History ==
In January 2017, Alfonso Cobo was studying at Parsons School of Design when he realized there was no software or app that could create a portfolio of his work on an iPad. Cobo created an app called Portfolio, a basic version of a portfolio layout app, and the first one to exist for iPad. He launched it in 2017. After launching the first version of Portfolio, Cobo realized the more popular market and use case was on mobile. Around that time, Instagram was launching Stories. As a result, Cobo pivoted the app away from portfolios and instead focused on an app to showcase one's stories. Cobo later contacted Andy McCune, founder of social media account Earth, to collaborate with Unfold.

Unfold also partnered with various companies to create custom templates. These include Equinox, Tommy Hilfiger, NARS, Billboard Music Awards, and Product Red. Unfold also launched a collection of Product Red templates to help eliminate HIV/AIDS in several African countries.

In 2019, Squarespace acquired Unfold.

The Unfold app has been downloaded over 60 million times and has been used to create over 1 billion Instagram stories.

== Features ==
With Unfold, users can utilize hundreds of templates to make social content for social media platforms such as Instagram, Snapchat, and Facebook.

The free app offers users basic templates and standard fonts, filters, and stickers, and there are also premium templates available for a monthly subscription. With Unfold+ and Unfold Pro (previously Unfold for Brands), users can access premium templates and tools, as well as upload custom brand assets and fonts.

In 2020, Unfold launched Bio Sites, which allows users to link to multiple sites and platforms.

== See also ==
- Squarespace
