= DENIC =

Manager of the .de domain for Germany

DENIC eG

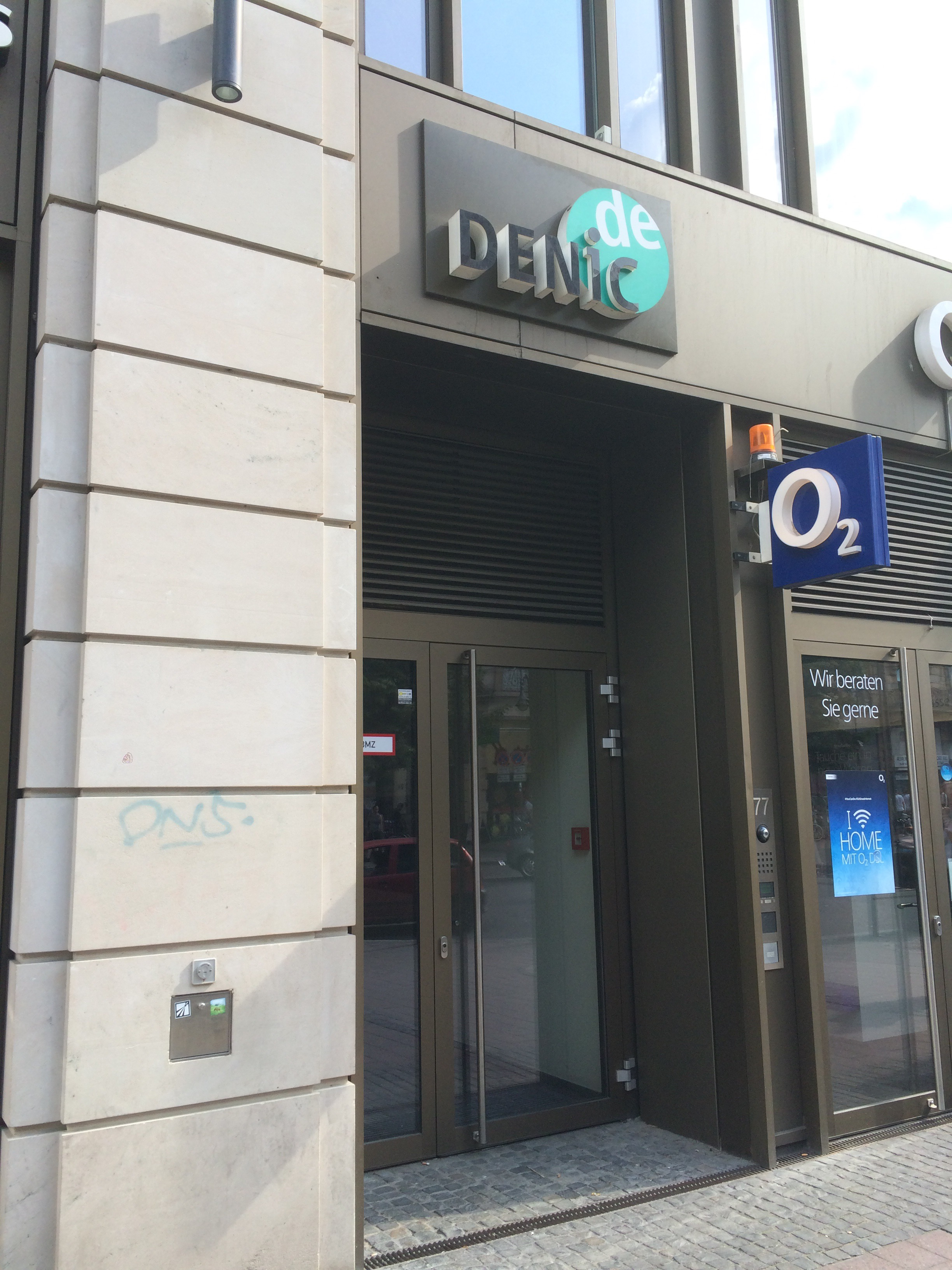
- Type: Eingetragene Genossenschaft (registered cooperative)
- Industry: Domain management
- Founded: 1996
- Headquarters: Frankfurt am Main, Germany
- Key people: Thomas Keller; Andreas Musielak; Dr. Johannes Loxen (Chair of Supervisory Board)
- Parent: Genossenschaftsverband
- Website: denic.de/en

DENIC eG is the manager of the .de domain, the country-code top-level domain for Germany. It was founded in 1996 and is organised as a non-regulated not-for-profit cooperative. DENIC provides the Domain Name System (DNS) as well as registration and management services for .de and .9.4.e164.arpa ENUM. Besides the whois lookup service for .de domains, its portfolio further includes DNS anycast services for registries and data escrow services for both registries and registrars of the domain industry.

The DENIC Cooperative has more than 300 members, 25 percent of them based in other countries than Germany. .de domains can be registered by any individual or legal entity worldwide.

Next to managing the German namespace on the Internet, DENIC is actively involved in national and international bodies coordinating the Internet ecosystem.

Rüdiger Volk at the University of Dortmund started to administer the .de domain in 1988, and introduced the name "de-NIC".
