= Norvergence =

Defunct American telecommunications corporation

NorVergence, incorporated as NorVergence, Inc., was a Newark, New Jersey corporation started by Thomas and Peter Salzano. Prior to filing for bankruptcy in July 2004, the company sold fraudulent telecommunications services, devices and related products to small businesses with little tech savvy.

In its three-year existence, NorVergence hired 1,800 sales and other employees and had revenues of $143 million.

The company cold-called companies, promising huge saving on their Internet and phone bills. The company's motto was "Drastically Reducing Telecommunications Costs". The company marketed a "Merged Access Transport Intelligent Exchange" (MATRIX) that it claimed would provide unlimited broadband Internet access, landline and cell phone services without per-minute charges. They claimed the MATRIX had "algorithms create the most efficient use of T-1 loops ever". However, the box was a full functional ATM and VoATM, connected to an ATM T1 normally. It has been accused of being nothing more than a firewall and router that could not provide Internet access or save on phone costs. But the box was designed by a genius scientist who put the same functionality that Carrier had with Large ATM devices into a device that could fit on most shelves of a telecom closet For the fraudulent device, the firm charged a flat fee and arranged financing for the rental of the MATRIX device for a period of usually five years.

Once NorVergence had moved into as many regional markets as possible and pitched every business in the area, NorVergence sold the leasing agreements to banks, and the banks would be left with the leasing agreements with the expectation that customers would continue to pay for the hardware leases for five years. The Five year payment price was on average 30% lower than the company's bills before the MATRIX installation.

After the company entered into bankruptcy, companies that had signed up for the service still had the leasing bank attempt to collect on the finance bills. Rental agreements stipulated that the finance companies could insist on full payment from customers even if NorVergence failed to provide the services promised. Over time, courts have invalidated some of the leases or banks have settled the cases.

Lawsuits against the company have been filed in numerous states, by both former employees and customers. The lawsuits allege that Norvergence was a Ponzi scheme or pyramid scheme, or that the technology did not work.

Calcasieu Parish, Louisiana District Attorney John DeRosier said, "The 11,000 plus victims around the country and the total amount of money that they have lost through this scheme is in excess of $300 million and nobody was doing anything about it. Now, they come to Calcasieu Parish and that's where we draw the line. We're not afraid to go after a complicated case. I think that it is a legitimate case of fraud."

On December 8, 2004, Pennsylvania Attorney General Gerald J. Pappert filed against Peter J. Salzano, seeking civil penalties in the amount of $1,000 for each and every violation of the consumer protection law, increased to $3,000 for each violation where the victim was age 60 or older.

Peter J. Salzano filed bankruptcy on January 1, 2005.

On September 11, 2006, the Federal Trade Commission filed charges against the Salzanos and won a stipulation judgment on October 17, 2007. The FTC won a default judgment of $181.7 million from NorVergence and a stipulated judgment keeping the Salzanos out of related businesses and any assets up to $50 million owed to NorVergence's lessees. The judgment also seeks money from Salzano's wife and son for NorVergence money allegedly used to pay personal bills.

Thomas Salzano was indicted in January 2008 on multiple charges of money laundering, conspiracy and theft. After a night in jail, he pleaded not guilty, surrendered his passport and posted a $75,000 bond. A hearing was scheduled for October 16, 2008.

Qwest and Sprint Nextel say the company owes them over $30 million. Tom Salzano's prior startup, Minimum Rate Pricing, also went bankrupt, owing WorldCom and Access Capital $67 million.
