= Krystal Hosting =

British web host and cloud-service provider

- Type: Private
- Founded: 2002; 24 years ago
- Headquarters: London, England
- Area served: Worldwide
- Key people: David Kimberley (CEO); Simon Blackler (Founder, Director)
- Services: Web hosting
- Number of employees: 70
- Website: www.krystal.io

Krystal Hosting (also known as Krystal) is a web hosting provider known for its shared hosting and VPS services. The company is based in the United Kingdom with its headquarters in London, but serves customers worldwide. As of 2025, Krystal is the UK's largest independently owned hosting company.

== History ==
Krystal was founded in 2002 by Simon Blackler following his experience with "unreliable and poor value" web hosting services.

In 2005, Krystal acquired ScotReg, in 2011, they acquired PurpleCloud and ZipHost, in 2014 they acquired Tidy.

Krystal opened a new data centre, Netwise, to customers in 2015 following a merger with another hosting company called Blackfoot Hosting Ltd on December 1, 2015. They also operated another location named The Bunker, a military grade, ex-Ministry of Defence data centre, prior to this.

In 2017, Krystal acquired Ariotek and Smart Hosting.

In 2018, they became a member of the Internet Watch Foundation, a charity whose aim is to eliminate child sexual abuse material on the internet. Krystal also acquired Squirrel and The Design Mechanics in the same year, followed by Blue Earth in 2019.

In 2020, Krystal acquired aTech, a software development company, their products would be added to Krystal's range and their team would go on to create Krystal's Onyx and Katapult products. In the same year, Krystal acquired aTech, followed by EveryCity in 2021.

In 2021, then-CEO Simon Blackler backed by Krystal ran a campaign to remove board members and the CEO of .UK registry Nominet UK due to the company reducing public benefit donations by 65% and increasing director pay by 70%. Blackler was criticised for the move by the directors who claimed that the move was "destabalising". Nominet was criticised throughout the campaign and "hiding voting rights" from members. The campaign was successful and resulted in the board members being removed after 52.7% voted to do so. The campaign was supported by almost 500 Nominet members including Blackler's company Krystal.

In 2023, the company trialed a 4-day work week which aimed to boost productivity and reduce staff stress. However, the experiment was cut short due to the workload becoming "more stressful" for staff.

In July 2024, Krystal was called the best host for "UK focused business sites" by TechRadar.

On 17 September 2024, Krystal announced that David Kimberley would take over as CEO from Simon effective immediately, as Simon wished to step down and explore other opportunities. Simon retained ownership of the company and remained on the board as a director.

== Products and services ==
Krystal operates standard shared web hosting, business hosting, as well as a number of specialist services including managed Wordpress hosting, reseller hosting, virtual private servers, dedicated servers, and content delivery networks.

They also own their Infrastructure as a Service platform Katapult. Katapult runs on the same renewable energy as the rest of their services. In benchmarks taken by TechRadar, Katapult had higher performance and lower latency than a number of other VPS providers including AWS, Google Cloud, and OVH. Katapult VPSs can be created in the United Kingdom, Netherlands, and the United States of America.

== Environmental initiatives ==
In 2023, Krystal became the world's first B Corporation certified web host and cloud provider, as of 2024 they have an overall B Impact Score of 81.8. They also signed up to “1% for the Planet”, committing to donate at least 1% of their revenue to help the environment. The company's data centres also run on 100% renewable electricity, and they have committed to planting 1 billion trees by 2030.
