= Alfonso Cobo =

Spanish businessman

- Born: 1992 (age 33–34); Canary Islands, Spain
- Occupation: Businessman
- Known for: Unfold

Alfonso Cobo (born 1992, Canary Islands, Spain) is a Spanish businessman. He is best known as the founder of Unfold, which was acquired by Squarespace in 2019.

== Early life ==
Alfonso was born in the Canary Islands, Spain and spent much of his childhood in Madrid before moving to the United Kingdom at 17.

== Career ==
As a university student, Cobo studied design and architecture. After working as an architectural designer in London, Cobo received a scholarship to Parsons School of Design and moved to New York. Cobo has a master's degree in strategic design and management from Parsons School of Design and a bachelor's degree in architecture from the University of Brighton.

In 2017, Cobo recognized there was no software or app that could create a portfolio of his work on an iPad. Later that year, he launched his portfolio layout app, the first one to exist for iPad.

Cobo founded Unfold in 2018 and was later joined by Andy McCune as a co-founder. Unfold, a mobile application that allows users to create Instagram Stories posts using a variety of templates and other tools. In 2019, Unfold was acquired by Squarespace. By then, it had 16 million users. In 2023, Unfold had over 60 million downloads, and over 1 billion stories were created using it. In 2020, Cobo launched Bio Sites with Squarespace, a tool that allows users to share relevant links.

Cobo received a Gaingels award in 2023. He also launched Hypelist, a social mobile application allowing for the curation of a recommended products list, in 2023.

== Personal life ==
As of 2019, Cobo lives in New York City. He is gay.
