= Squarespace =

American SaaS-based web hosting platform

Squarespace, Inc.

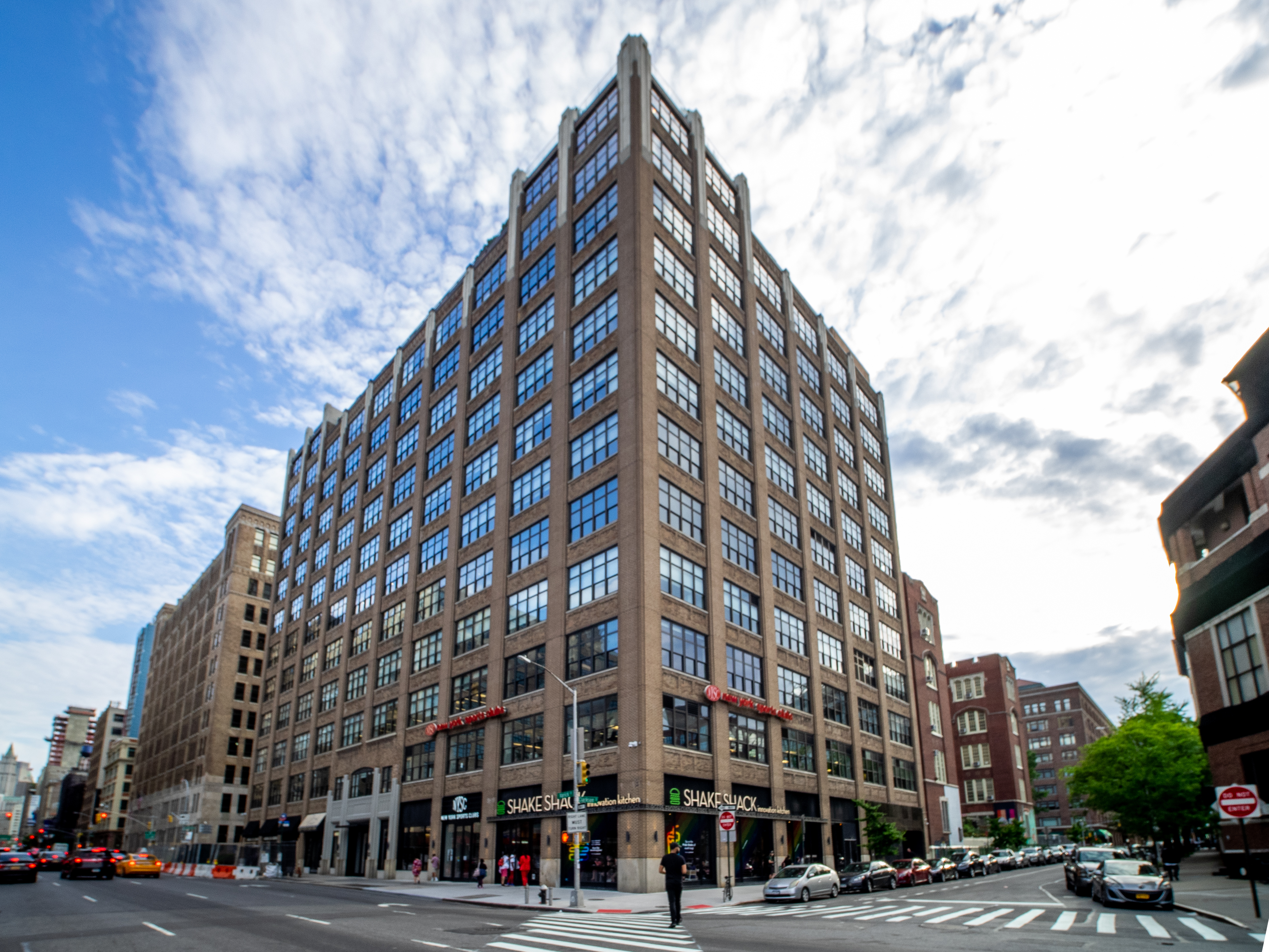
- Headquarters in Manhattan
- Company type: Private
- Website type: SaaS-based hosting platform
- Traded as: NYSE: SQSP
- Headquarters: 225 Varick Street; New York City, New York, United States
- Area served: Worldwide
- Owner: Permira
- Founder: Anthony Casalena
- CEO: Anthony Casalena
- Industry: Internet
- Products: Website builder and hosting service
- Revenue: ▲US$1.01 billion (2023)
- Employees: 1,749 (2023)
- Website: Official website
- Registration: Required; subscription needed for certain features.
- Launched: January 2004; 22 years ago

Squarespace, Inc. is an American website building, hosting, and domain registration company based in New York City. It provides software as a service for website building, e-commerce, domain registration, marketing, and online scheduling. The platform allows users to use pre-built website templates, drag-and-drop editing, and artificial intelligence-powered design tools.

In 2003, Anthony Casalena founded Squarespace as a blog hosting service while attending the University of Maryland, College Park. He was its only employee until 2006 when it reached $1 million in revenue. The company grew from 30 employees in 2010 to 550 by 2015. Over the years, the company evolved to become more than a website builder, expanded internationally, and grew its employee base. It began trading on the New York Stock Exchange on May 19, 2021, and was taken private in October 2024. As of October 2026, Squarespace was used by 2.4% of all websites and by 3.6% of websites whose content management system is known, according to W3Techs. In its 2026 review of website builders, WIRED listed Squarespace as the "best website builder for most people," emphasizing its balance of usability and design flexibility.

== History ==
Casalena began developing Squarespace for his personal use while attending the University of Maryland. He started sharing it with friends and family members and participated in a "business incubator" program at the university. In January 2004, he launched Squarespace as do-it-yourself website builder for the public, with a $30,000 seed fund from his father, a small grant from the university, and 300 beta testers who paid a discounted rate. At that time, Casalena was the company's sole developer and employee, and worked out of his dorm room.

By the time Casalena graduated in 2005, Squarespace was making annual revenues of $1 million. He moved to New York City, continued hiring, and had 30 employees by 2010. That year, Squarespace received $38.5 million in its first round of venture capital funding led by Index Ventures and Accel Partners, enabling it to hire more staff, continue to develop its software, and double its marketing budget. From 2009 to 2012, it grew an average of 266% in yearly revenue. In April 2014, it received another $40 million in funding. By 2015, it had reached $100 million in revenue and 550 employees.

Squarespace purchased Super Bowl advertising spots from 2014 to 2026. Its 2017 ad won an Emmy Award for Outstanding Commercial. In 2017, it signed a sponsorship deal with the New York Knicks to add the Squarespace logo to their uniforms.

Squarespace acquired appointment scheduling company Acuity Scheduling in April 2019. In October 2019, Squarespace acquired Unfold, an app co-founded by Alfonso Cobo that allows users to editorialize their social media content. In April 2021, the company bought hospitality industry management platform Tock for more than $400 million. It sold Tock to American Express in June 2024.

In early 2021, the company filed paperwork with the U.S. Securities and Exchange Commission (SEC) to go public through direct listing on the New York Stock Exchange under the symbol "SQSP". In March 2021, Squarespace raised $300 million in a round of funding led by Dragoneer, Tiger Global, D1 Capital Partners and Fidelity Management & Research Company with participation from existing investors. This funding round valued the company at $10 billion.

On June 15, 2023, Squarespace concluded an agreement to purchase the Google Domains business, including approximately 10 million registered domain names.

In May 2024, Squarespace signed a deal with British private equity firm Permira to be taken private. The transaction was finalized in October 2024.

== Corporate affairs ==
=== Leadership ===
Squarespace is managed by CEO and Founder Anthony Casalena. Other key executives are:

- Courtenay O'Connor, General Counsel
- David Lee, Chief Brand and Creative Officer
- John Colton, Chief Technology Officer
- Nathan Gooden, Chief Financial Officer
- Angela Crossman, Chief People Officer
- Raphael Fontes, Chief Customer Officer
- Roberta Meo, Vice President, Channels and Services
- Kevin Doerr, President
- Josh Groth, SVP, Marketing

== Products ==
Website builder

Squarespace was initially built for creating and hosting blogs. In 2011, Squarespace was upgraded to version 6, with new templates, a grid-based user interface, and other enhancements. Version 7, which went live in 2014, replaced its coding backend with a drag and drop interface, and added integration with Google Workspace (formerly G Suite and Google Apps for Work) and Getty Images. The platform includes responsive templates and integrated SEO tools. In 2026, Squarespace was ranked as the "best all-around website builder" by SiteBuilderReport for a range of site types including small businesses, portfolios, and online stores.

E-commerce

E-commerce functionality, such as integration with Stripe for accepting credit card payments, was added in 2013. Additional commerce features were added in 2014 and beyond, including payments integration and analytics. In 2023, Squarespace introduced a native payment solution to expand its commerce infrastructure.

Domains

Squarespace started selling domains in 2016. In 2023, it acquired the Google Domains business, adding approximately 10 million domains under management. The acquisition significantly expanded its presence as a domain registrar, and is now one of the largest domain providers worldwide according to Domain Name Stat.

Artificial intelligence

Starting in 2024, Squarespace introduced AI-driven features for automating website layout generation, AI-generated copy suggestions, SEO recommendations and content optimization.
