= Shared Whois Project =

Mechanism to submit and update WHOIS records

The Shared Whois Project (SWIP) is the process used to submit, maintain and update information to ensure up-to-date and efficient maintenance of WHOIS records, as structured in RFC 1491. The process updates WHOIS to contain information regarding what organization is using a specific IP address, or a specific block of addresses. Additionally, it provides means to track the use of an organization's current allocations of IP addresses, so that additional allocation of IP addresses may be justified and usage reports or case studies may be done.

SWIP must be used within seven days of any reassignment of an IP address space to a downstream customer to:

- Provide new reassignments of blocks of eight or more IP addresses
- Delete existing reassignments, or
- Modify data connected to existing reassignments.

In contrast, an organization is not required to submit a SWIP template for fewer than eight IP addresses.

Allocations, assignments or reassignments of blocks of 8,192 addresses and more (greater than a /19 block) must be approved by ARIN beforehand. Companies assigned a block of 65,536 addresses or more will be responsible for maintaining all IN-ADDR.ARPA domain records for their customers.

There are two types of registration. The first is an allocation, for blocks of IP addresses which will later be reallocated or reassigned to third parties. The second is an assignment, for blocks that will not be reassigned, or the recipient is an end-user.

== Bibliography ==
- G Siganos; M Faloutsos (2007). "Neighborhood Watch for Internet Routing: Can We Improve the Robustness of Internet Routing Today?". EEE INFOCOM 2007 - 26th IEEE International Conference on Computer Communications; 1271-1279; IEEE. pp. 1271–1279. doi:10.1109/INFCOM.2007.151. ISBN 978-1-4244-1047-7. ISSN 0743-166X. OCLC 4799540038. S2CID 2992700.
- Kotikapaludi Sriram; Oliver Borchert; Okhee Kim; Patrick Gleichmann; Doug Montgomery (2009). "A Comparative Analysis of BGP Anomaly Detection and Robustness Algorithms". 2009 Cybersecurity Applications & Technology Conference for Homeland Security; 25-38. pp. 25–38. doi:10.1109/CATCH.2009.20. ISBN 978-0-7695-3568-5. OCLC 4801251800. S2CID 15994476.
