= .de =

Country code top-level domain for Germany

- Introduced: 5 November 1986; 39 years ago
- TLD type: Country code top-level domain
- Status: Active
- Registry: DENIC
- Sponsor: DENIC eG
- Intended use: Entities connected with Germany
- Actual use: Overwhelmingly popular in Germany and gets some use overseas, also used for domain hacks (e.g. alongsi.de)
- Registered domains: 17,639,014 (2025-03-31)
- Registration restrictions: None
- Structure: May register at second level
- Dispute policies: DISPUTE-Entries
- DNSSEC: Yes
- Registry website: denic.de

.de is the country code top-level domain (ccTLD) for Germany. DENIC (the Network Information Centre responsible for .de domains) does not require specific second-level domains, and there are no official ccSLDs under .de ccTLD, as it is the case with the .uk domain range which until 2014 required .co.uk domain for example.

== Namesake ==
The name is based on the first two letters of the German name for Germany (Deutschland). Prior to 1990, East Germany had a separate ISO 3166-1 code (dd), and had never delegated a ccTLD, .dd.

== Usage ==
.de is currently the second most popular ccTLD in terms of number of registrations with .cn being the first most popular ccTLD and .uk being third. It is third after .com and .cn among all TLDs.

The first point of registration for .de domains was at the Department of Computer Science of the University of Dortmund. uni-dortmund.de was among the first registered .de-domains.

.de registrations may be directly ordered from DENIC but it is faster and cheaper to do so via a DENIC member (registrar).

== Registration ==
Previously, domain names had to be at least three letters long.

There were a few two-letter domains registered before the rule was put in place: db.de (Deutsche Bahn, German Railways), ix.de (the German computing magazine iX), and hq.de. Another domain, bb.de (Bilfinger Berger), was later deregistered (and after 2009 registered by another company).

As a result of a lawsuit by Volkswagen, which wanted to register the two-letter domain "vw.de", after 23 October 2009, DENIC was forced to allow the registration of single- and two-letter domains as well as number-only domains, such as 123.de, xx.de or v.de.

Registrations of internationalized domain names (IDN) are also accepted so that all diacritics of German, many diacritics of other languages and the eszett, ß, may be used.

In many of the Romance languages, e.g., Spanish, French, Romanian and Portuguese, "de" expresses the genitive of a noun (like "of" in English). This is exploited in domain registrations under the German TLD for romance language webhosts that offer customized sites, like elforo.de (theforum.of), encoding the site name into the URL path, such as elforo.de/wikipedia, meaning theforum.of/Wikipedia.

== .dd ==
In accordance with IANA policy, .dd would have been available to be assigned in the root nameservers as the country code top-level domain (ccTLD) for East Germany. Its only use was internally in an isolated network among the universities of Jena and Dresden.

With the reunification of Germany, East Germany became part of the Federal Republic of Germany (West Germany), which had already been assigned the ccTLD .de. The ISO 3166-1 code "DD" was withdrawn in 1990.

== See also ==
- Internet in Germany
- .ag
- .eu –ccTLD for the European Union

=== Generic geographic domains, connected to Germany ===
- .bayern
- .berlin
- .hamburg
- .nrw
- .koeln / .cologne
- .ruhr
- .saarland
