= Telephone slamming =

Telecommunications scam

Telephone slamming is an illegal telecommunications practice, in which a subscriber's telephone service is changed without their consent. Slamming became a more visible issue after the deregulation of the telecommunications industry in the mid-1980s, especially after several price wars between the major telecommunications companies. The term slamming was coined by Mick Ahearn, who was a consumer marketing manager at AT&T in September 1987. The inspiration for the term came from the ease with which a competitor could switch a customer's service away from AT&T by falsely notifying a telephone company that an AT&T customer had elected to switch to their service. This process gave AT&T's competitors a "slam dunk" method for the unauthorized switching of a customer's long-distance service. The term slamming became an industry standard term for this practice.

Variations of this concept include "merchant account slamming" or "credit card processing slamming" in which a business's debit and credit card processing terminal is reprogrammed so that charges are processed through a different company, and "domain slamming" where an Internet domain name registrar is changed.

== Methods ==
In the United States, local carriers have been responsible for distributing telephone numbers to individuals and businesses since AT&T split up into local and long-distance carriers as a result of demonopolization. Orders to change long-distance carriers would be submitted to them, and the local carrier would make the change. In the most common scenario regarding slamming, an employee of a telephone company (usually a telemarketer making outbound calls to prospective clients) would submit an order to change carriers to the local exchange carrier without the approval of the customer.

In the United Kingdom, landline telecommunications services were provided exclusively by BT until 1984 when the industry was demonopolized, and the number of independent operators providing fixed-line domestic telephone services increased. Similar fraudulent sales practices have been alleged by British customers who claim that their landline service has been switched to a new service provider.

Slamming can also occur when someone is invited to take a survey or enter a contest. The contests or surveys are usually general in nature, and the participant is unaware that the "small print" on their entry is an authorization to switch their telephone service to another carrier.

Another common sales pitch leading to slamming involves misrepresentation of the slammers as account agents of the victim's current carrier, offering better rates or a free upgrade to existing service. Slammers using this pitch may even operate by sending bills attached to the victim's existing carrier's bills, further perpetrating the illusion of an upgrade to existing service rather than an unauthorized service switch.

Slamming has traditionally meant the selection of another long-distance carrier without the subscriber's consent; however, as the US market has expanded, and choice of local long-distance service and local service providers has increased over the last 10 years, there have been some instances of slamming for those services as well.

The problem has not been limited to landlines. In Britain, complaints have been received by OFCOM relating to mobile telephone contracts being renewed without the consent of customers.

There have also been cases of slamming for secondary services (such as voice mail, etc.), or of mobile telephone companies using private data to switch customers onto landline services provided by their subsidiaries.

The move by many wireless companies in the US from an unlimited data plan to tiered data services has led to a new form of slamming, consisting of changing a customer's unlimited data plan to a metered plan without informing the customer. This can happen when a customer makes an unrelated change to the plan, such as adding another line.

== Prevention ==
=== United States ===
Most US local carriers have instituted a number of steps to prevent slamming. Subscribers can request a "freeze" on their long-distance and local services. This means that no changes will take place unless the local carrier receives a request from the service provider in writing.

Industry regulators advise consumers to read their telephone bill and question any charges they do not recognize, as many slammers operate by inserting their charges into bills which customers normally expect from their chosen carrier. Bills must contain the name and logo of any company whose charges are appearing on your bill. (See cramming for more information about other types of charges that may appear on a bill.)

Because of repeated complaints from consumers, and legislative actions at the state and federal level, companies are now required to submit any verbal request for change of services to a third-party verification services. The third party verification service will record the conversation and verify that the person calling does indeed want to select a new long-distance carrier or in some way change their service(s).

Consumers are advised to decline verbally any telemarketer offer if they do not wish to change their services, or if they are unfamiliar with the company or the services offered.

Customers wishing to avoid being slammed may simply request a web-site address from the telemarketing agent, and investigate the service on their own terms, rather than agreeing to purchase the offered services over the telephone.

=== United Kingdom ===
In the United Kingdom, the governmental organisation OFCOM is responsible for regulating the telecoms industry. OFCOM has powers to take action against companies that engage in mis-selling and slamming, and can fine these companies up to ten per cent of their turnover. In 2007, these rules were extended to include mis-selling of voice and broadband services using full Local Loop Unbundling (LLU) technology.

British consumers who suspect they have fallen victim to slamming can report the incident to Ofcom, who say "we can't investigate individual cases, your complaints can lead to us launching investigations and ultimately to us taking action".

=== Ireland ===
In the Republic of Ireland, the communications regulator, known as COMREG, regulates all telecommunications activities and can also be called on to arbitrate disputes between rival telecommunication companies. This agency was set up after the IPO of Telecom Éireann, which became Eircom upon privatization.

=== Australia ===
The practice of slamming is illegal in Australia, and a number of regulatory bodies enforce this. Relevant state and federal legislation makes it an offence to bill for unsolicited goods or services, and the Telecommunications Industry Ombudsman (www.tio.com.au) will usually compel the offending company to reverse the transfer and waive all charges. The transfer process is supposed to contain checks including the date of birth of the account holder, but in practice some transfers occur without this information.

== See also ==
- Domain slamming
- Phone fraud
- SIM swap attack
