= Namecheap =

American domain registrar and web hosting company

Namecheap, Inc.
- Type: Private
- Industry: Web service
- Founded: 2000; 26 years ago
- Headquarters: Phoenix, Arizona, United States
- Key people: Richard Kirkendall (founder); Sergii Smirnov (CTO)
- Services: Domain name registration, Web hosting, VPN
- Website: namecheap.com

Namecheap, Inc. is an American domain name registrar and web hosting service company based in Phoenix, Arizona. It was founded in 2000 by Richard Kirkendall. The company provides domain name registration, web hosting, SSL certificates, content delivery network services, email hosting, privacy protection, and other internet-related services.

In September 2025, CVC Capital Partners acquired a majority stake in Namecheap for an undisclosed amount, valuing the company at $1.5 billion. Kirkendall stepped down as CEO on December 16, 2025; Hillan Klein (Namecheap's COO since September 2013) then assumed the position of CEO at Namecheap.

== Services ==
The company provides domain registration, transfers, and renewals. It also provides web hosting services, including shared hosting, VPS hosting, and dedicated servers. As of 2022, Namecheap managed over 10 million domains and had nearly 11 million customers.

In April 2013, the New Yorker reported that Namecheap had begun accepting Bitcoin as a payment method.

In August 2023, Namecheap launched Spaceship.com, a subordinate brand for domain registration and web hosting services.

== History ==
=== ICANN price caps decision ===
In July 2019, Namecheap was one of the organizations that filed a reconsideration request to ICANN, asking for a review of the decision to remove price ceilings on .org and .info TLDs. The Independent Review Process panel concluded in December 2022 that ICANN had broken its own bylaws and made recommendations that included restoring the price caps.

Namecheap went on to file a lawsuit in January 2024, claiming that ICANN “largely ignored” the majority of its recommendations. In October that year, the Superior Court of California, County of Los Angeles ruled that the case could move forward, denying ICANN’s request to dismiss.

In April 2025, Namecheap filed a motion asking the court to force ICANN to negotiate with registries over price controls. In August of the same year, the court ruled against the request and denied the motion.

=== Termination of service to Russian accounts ===
In February 2022, Namecheap announced that it would terminate services to Russian accounts due to the 2022 Russian invasion of Ukraine, citing "war crimes and human rights violations". Existing users were given a one-week grace period to move their domains. The next day, the deadline was extended by another three weeks. The company also announced that it would be offering free anonymous domain registration and web hosting to all anti-war websites that engaged in protest in Russia or Belarus.

Namecheap reported in March 2022 that the company had over 1,000 employees located in Ukraine. These employees were predominantly residents of Kharkiv, which had been heavily impacted by the invasion at that time, according to Domain Incite.

=== Ban in India ===
On 15 February 2023, the Delhi High Court ordered the Indian Ministry of Electronics and Information Technology to block Namecheap and four other domain registrars due to cybersquatting and noncompliance with India's Information Technology Rules, 2021.

=== 2025 phishing attacks ===
Namecheap was the number one registrar abused in business email compromise attacks in 2025, according to the Anti-Phishing Working Group Q4 report. Together, Namecheap and its sister company, Spaceship, had over 116,000 confirmed phishing attacks that year.

=== Takedown of Israeli war crimes archive ===
On 31 December 2025, Namecheap took down the Genocide.live domain, which hosted 16,000 videos documenting alleged Israeli war crimes in the Gaza War. Namecheap gave no revocation notice nor option to appeal. The domain was released and safely transferred out with Namecheap's assistance within three days. Some of these videos are used in the ongoing proceedings of the case South Africa et al. v. Israel at the International Court of Justice.
