= Nominet UK =

.uk domain name registry

- Formation: 24 May 1996; 30 years ago
- Type: Nonprofit
- Legal status: Company Limited by Guarantee
- Location: Oxford, United Kingdom
- Region served: United Kingdom
- Services: ccTLD registry, cyber security
- Members: 2500 (2020/21)
- Chair: Andy Green
- CEO: Paul Fletcher (effective February 2022)
- Elected Non-Executive Director: Simon Blackler
- Elected Non-Executive Director: Ashley La Bolle
- Subsidiaries: Nominet US Inc.
- Website: www.nominet.uk

Nominet UK is currently delegated by IANA to be the manager of the .uk domain name. Nominet directly manages registrations directly under .uk, and some of the second level domains .co.uk, .org.uk, .sch.uk, .me.uk, .net.uk, .ltd.uk and .plc.uk. Nominet also manages the .wales and .cymru domains.

As of February 2021, the .uk register held 10,922,477 .uk domain names. This represents a year-on-year downward trend, when compared to February 2020, this is mainly due to the lapsing of the recently launched .uk domain names.

== Background ==
Nominet was founded by Dr. Willie Black and five others on 14 May 1996 when its predecessor, the "Naming Committee" was unable to deal with the volume of registrations then being sought under the .uk domain. Nominet is a not-for-profit company limited by guarantee. It has members who act as shareholders, but without the right to participate in the profits of the company. Anyone can become a member, but most members are Internet service providers (ISPs) who are also registrars.

Nominet also deals with disputes about registrations of .uk domain names, via its Dispute Resolution Service (DRS) which is similar to the UDRP system used for generic Top Level Domain Names.

Nominet also delivers the National Cyber Security Centre's Protective Domain Name Service (PDNS) since 2016, protecting the UK public sector's internet traffic.

== History ==
=== 1985–2000 ===
Most countries have their own top-level domain (TLD). The .uk TLD was first used in 1985. and at that time a voluntary group called the "Naming Committee" managed the registration of .uk domain names. This consisted of members of LINX as full members (the main ISPs in the UK), and their resellers as guest members. By the mid-1990s, ISPs who registered domains for their customers were joined by a new breed of domain name specialists who had an entrepreneurial attitude to domain names. The Naming Committee operated a ruleset that forced all name registrations to 'exactly' match the name of the registering company and also limited all companies to a single domain name. The growth of the commercial internet soon brought these restrictions into close focus.

As demand for domain name registrations grew, it became clear that a voluntary group could no longer cope with the volume of registrations being requested. It also became clear that the existing ruleset was not sustainable and the Naming Committee was going to break down under the pressure of registrations.

When it became clear that a new organization with a new approach was needed to manage the .uk TLD, the Naming Committee mailing list had mutated into a discussion group for domain name issues and many discussions about what type of corporation the Registry should be were held. Meanwhile, at UKERNA, Dr. Willie Black and John Carey were watching the situation and in 1996 John Carey wrote a proposed plan for a new organization to be called Nominet. This was distributed widely, and a meeting to discuss ways forward was held at a hotel at Heathrow Airport on 11 April 1996.

The options to set up as a profit-making company or a charity were rejected, and Nominet was established on 14 May 1996 as a private, not-for-profit membership company, limited by guarantee. Whilst the move was generally popular, there was strong resistance from some parts of the industry. Although formed with a board composed of Dr. Black (who became the first CEO of the new company), John Carey, and the four co-founders drawn from the internet industry, elections were held by the new membership which resulted in the first elected board members to oversee the growth of the UK domain name industry. John Carey resigned before taking up his role following a disagreement over the creation of police.uk.

From Nominet's inception on 1 July 1996 until 2002 domains registered pre-Nominet were provided free of charge. In 2002, as had been hinted at its inception in 1996, Nominet began a process over two years of migrating those domains onto Nominet standard terms and conditions and implementing charging. Those domains can be identified within the whois results as having a registration date of before August 1996.

=== 2000–2020 ===
In 2008 Nominet launched a charitable foundation, the Nominet Trust, and contributed some of its profits to it.

In 2011 The Independent published an article containing quotes about people trying to demutualize Nominet for their own benefit.

In 2015, Russell Haworth, a former mergers and acquisition specialist, became CEO of Nominet. During his tenure Nominet invested heavily into autonomous vehicles, the Internet of things, and white-space spectrum management which did not pan out. Despite these outcomes, board salaries continued to rise.

In May 2018 Nominet relinquished control over the Nominet Trust organisation, which was renamed Social Tech Trust and announced a "strategic partnership with Social Tech Business". By 2020 the income of Social Tech Trust had fallen to £99,000 from £5.6 million in 2018.

Nominet admitted it wrongly calculated election results for its board of directors in 2018 and 2019.

In 2019, customers of 123-Reg and Namesco were invoiced for domain names that were reserved for free by Nominet.

=== 2020–present ===
In 2020, it was revealed that Nominet's introduction of .uk to compete with .co.uk and .org.uk has resulted in increased cost to UK brand owners and caused much confusion amongst registrants.

A £4 million investment into registry services was announced in February 2020 alongside the acquisition of US-based cyber security company CyGlass.

In July 2020 Nominet announced a new policy consultation for expiring .uk domain names, however the consultation proved to be controversial and widely unpopular.

In September 2020, .uk registry watchers noticed unexpected changes in ownership of various .uk names, including sunset.uk, waterfall.uk, pad.uk and trending.uk, all of which were sold by Fasthosts to one or more industry insiders in advance of the domains being released by Nominet rather than going through the proper public process. Around the same time, speaking at Nominet's 2020 annual general meeting (AGM), CEO Russell Haworth shocked members by announcing he was shutting down its internal web forum – the only means of independent communication between members – effective immediately, a move which was widely criticised.

In February 2021 over 140 members requested an extraordinary general meeting to vote on removing five board directors, including the chair, and to appoint Michael Lyons, former chairman of the BBC, and Axel Pawlik, former managing director of RIPE NCC. On 22 March 2021 an Extraordinary General Meeting (EGM) was held with the goal to remove five directors from the Nominet board, which was successful. The motion was carried with 53.5% of the votes for the motion, and 47.26% against. Rob Binns, a former Group Treasurer at HP Inc. and then CFO at The Access Group, was appointed as acting chair.

Paul Fletcher was appointed as replacement CEO of Nominet starting in February 2022. In the first days Fletcher joined the board and held a meeting with members.

On 10 March 2022, Nominet announced it would be "not accepting registrations from registrars in Russia – we are suspending the relevant tags" and in doing so became the first previously neutral ccTLD in history to reposition itself as non-neutral.

== 2021 removal of directors ==
According to the Public Benefit .UK campaign started by Krystal Hosting's then-CEO Simon Blackler Nominet made a number of changes that were "unacceptable". From 2016 to 2020 Nominet reduced its public benefit donations from £5.4M to £1.9M (65%) reduced their operating profit from £8M to £5M (38%), increased its top three director's pay from £1M to £1.7M (70%), ignored members' concerns and input, and tried to silence critics, the press and members.

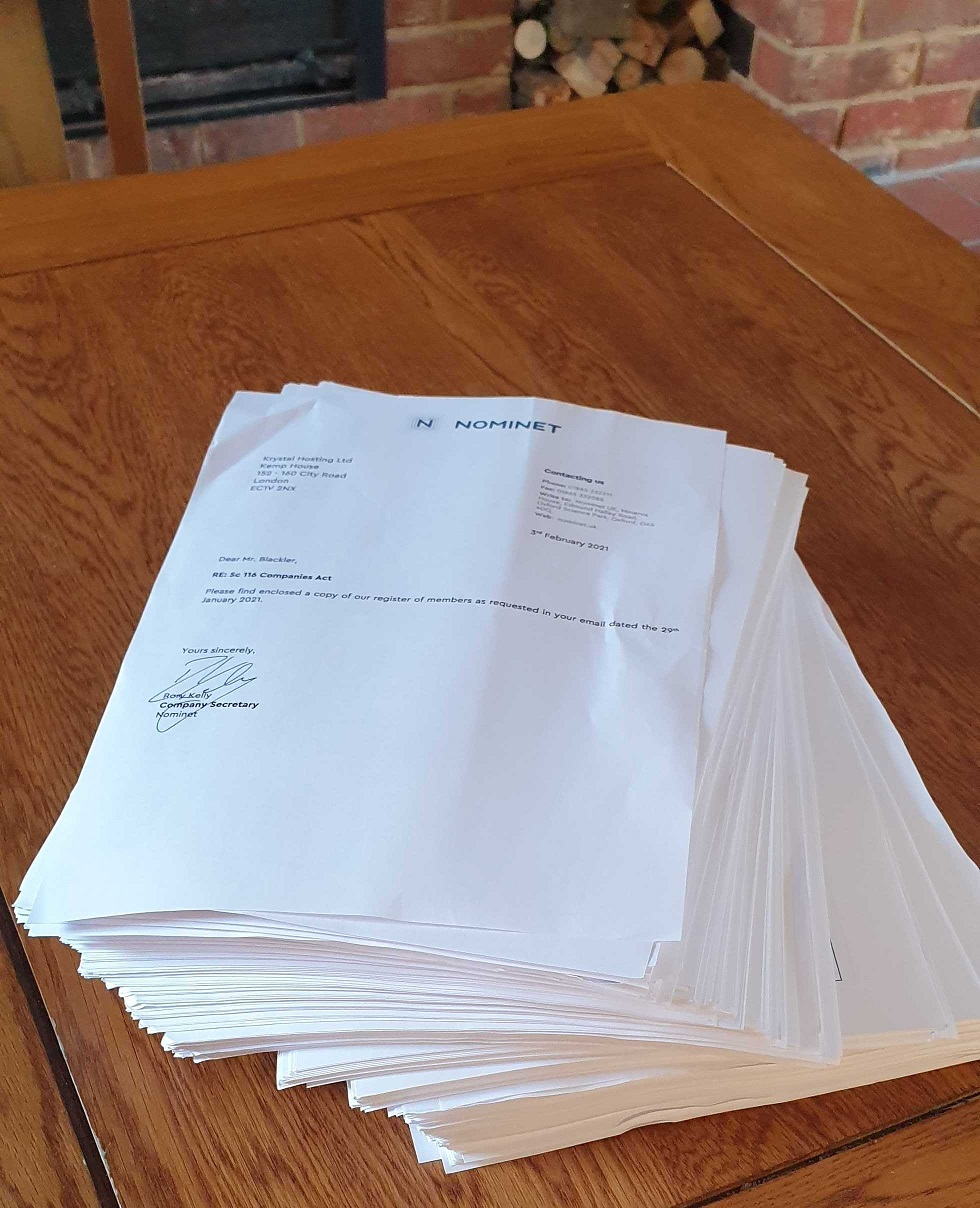
Nominet members list, printed out on 575 individual sheets of paper, instead of being supplied electronically.

On 29 January 2021, an email request was made to Rory Kelly, the Nominet company secretary, to provide a list of members of Nominet. Kelly responded on 3 February 2021 to the request by printing out the Nominet members list on 575 sheets of A4 paper, omitting the contact email addresses of members, and posting the bundle to the registered company address of the original requester. In response, the recipient Krystal Hosting arranged for 575 trees to be planted "to offset Nominet's nonsense".

On 2 February 2021, over 140 members wrote to the board of directors via Rory Kelly the company secretary calling for a general meeting to propose two ordinary resolutions:

1. Remove Eleanor Bradley, Russell Haworth, Ben Hill, Jane Tozer and Mark Wood as directors before expiration of their respective periods of office and despite anything in any agreement between them and Nominet UK; and
2. Appoint Sir Michael Lyons and Axel Pawlik as directors.

Rory Kelly, Company Secretary stated that the number of votes each member was entitled to cast would not be released until the results had been published. The voting rights of the members were subsequently released after the EGM.

In the lead up to the vote at the EGM a number of Nominet members publicly announced their position on the resolution to be tabled at the EGM. Tucows, Namecheap, LINX, and Krystal Hosting all announced they would support the removal of the directors. Blacknight stated that they would vote against, with their CEO stating that "there should be a dialogue – not a double-barreled shotgun". Google announced that it did not intend to vote on the motion.

=== Results ===
The Extraordinary General Meeting (EGM) was held on 22 March 2021. The motion to remove the five directors from the board was carried with 53.5% of the votes for the motion, and 47.26% against. Following the EGM, Nominet stated that "Eleanor Bradley and Ben Hill remain in their executive posts."

Five of the original Nominet founders (Richard Almeida, Willie Black, Alex Bligh, Keith Mitchell, and Nigel Titley) pledged their "commitment to support Sir Michael Lyons and Axel Pawlik if they are appointed to the board of Nominet UK, in whatever way we reasonably can with matters relating to the future of Nominet".

By 31 March 2021, Nominet had made four internal appointments with Rob Binns (a previous board member) being appointed acting chair of the board, Eleanor Bradley as interim CEO (formerly COO), Rory Kelly (Nominet Company Secretary) as a board member, and Adam Leach (Nominet CIO) as a board member. Appointment of Kelly and Leach to the board had occurred on 22 March 2021, corresponding to the date of the EGM.

On 7 April 2021, Bradley, as interim CEO, stated that Nominet would begin to regularly publish the voting rights of members.

On 12 April 2021 Sir Michael Lyons and Alex Pawlik sent a joint letter to the acting Chair Rob Binns. The remnant board of Nominet subsequently announced: "After much careful consideration, the board has decided not to invite Sir Michael to be acting chair". The following day, Nominet had selected Russell Reynolds Associates to seek a replacement chair of Nominet on an initial three-year term.

By 15 April 2021 survey responses from 200 Nominet members that had supported the earlier EGM, showed 97% support for calling a second EGM, with confidence in the board decreasing to 1.3 out of 10.

On 22 July 2021, Nominet stated that Andy J. Green CBE had been appointed new chair of the board, along with Eva Lindqvist as a new independent director, from 21 July 2021. Priorities would be reduction of costs and executive pay, re-building of trust with the membership, and restoration of Nominet's public benefit purpose and charitable proceeds.

=== 2021 Annual General Meeting ===
Nominet's Annual General Meeting (AGM) was scheduled for 18 November 2021. Prior to the AGM, elections were held to appoint two new member-elected non-executive directors to the Nominet board. Public Benefit candidates received the highest votes, having Simon Blackler elected immediately with over 50 percent of first-preference votes, followed by Ashley La Bolle of Tucows taking 35% of the vote. Blackler and La Bolle replaced out-going directors James Bladel of GoDaddy (who had not stood for re-election), and David Thornton, who "defended the previous management's actions", had received six percent of the votes. It was announced that BCS CEO Paul Fletcher would takeover as Nominet CEO from February 2022.

Votes held at the 2021 AGM formally appointed Andy Green and Eva Lindqvist, both for three years, with over 94% of votes. Stephen Page (who "was opposed by the Public Benefit campaign") received 51.4% of weighted votes for an extension of one year as a director.

== Structural issues ==
Nominet's success brought with it several structural concerns. Over time, it built considerable cash reserves. In 1999, candidates stood for the board on a platform similar to 'carpetbagging' attempts with mutual building societies; whilst this was defeated, following a financial report from Alex Bligh, one of the founders, covering the potential conflict between turning a profit to maintaining sufficient financial reserves and its goal of maintaining long-term profit and loss neutrality.

Nominet has consistently increased the salaries of its employees, especially directors. Average salaries have increased from £28,542 in 2002 to £60,276 in 2014. In the same period, the highest-paid director went from £125,000 to £308,000.

== Registry ==
=== Top-level domains ===
Nominet manages the registry of the following top-level domains:

- .uk – top-level domain for the United Kingdom
- .cymru – top-level domain for Wales
- .wales – top-level domain for Wales

=== Second-level domains managed by Nominet ===
Nominet manages the following second-level domains:

- .co.uk – unrestricted, intended for businesses
- .org.uk – unrestricted, intended for non-profit organisations
- .net.uk – reserved exclusively for UK Internet service providers
- .ltd.uk – reserved exclusively for UK limited liability companies; subdomain must correspond to the company's registered name
- .plc.uk – reserved exclusively for UK public limited companies; subdomain must correspond to the company's registered name
- .sch.uk – reserved exclusively for primary and secondary schools
- .me.uk – unrestricted, intended for personal use

=== Second-level domains managed by other organisations ===
- .mod.uk – operated by the Ministry of Defence
- .mil.uk – operated by the Ministry of Defence

=== Quasi second-level domains ===
The following are widely used as second-level domains but are registered with Nominet as top-level domains:

- .gov.uk was used as a second-level domain for UK government agencies until 2012 when gov.uk started functioning as a Nominet-registered independent domain.
- .ac.uk is commonly used as a second-level domain for UK education and research establishments, but ac.uk is actually a Nominet-registered domain held by JANET.

== See also ==
- .uk (ccTLD)
- .io (TLD)
- Uniform Domain-Name Dispute-Resolution Policy
- Apple Inc. litigation § itunes.co.uk – Nominet's ruling for Apple Computer in the dispute of the itunes.co.uk domain
- Internet Provider Security
