= Domain name registrar =

Manager of Internet domain names

A domain name registrar is a company, person, or office that manages the reservation of Internet domain names.

A domain name registrar must be accredited by a generic top-level domain (gTLD) registry or a country code top-level domain (ccTLD) registry. A registrar operates in accordance with the guidelines of the designated domain name registries. As of March 2024, there are 2,800 domain name registrars accredited by ICANN.

== History ==
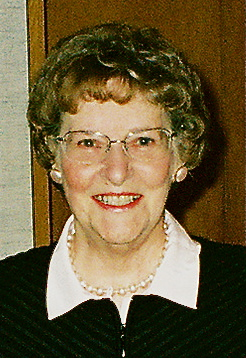
Elizabeth "Jake" Feinler, the first registrar of top-level domains

=== Creation ===
The need for a central authority to assign or administer domain names emerged from collaboration among computer network pioneers as they created the Domain Name System in the 1980s. In a 1982 draft Request for Comments (RFC), editor Jonathan Postel proposed a "czar of domains." In her revisions of the draft, Jake Feinler crossed out "czar" and introduced the term "registrar." She designated the DOD Network Information Center, of which she was the head, as the registrar of top-level domains.

This draft was published as RFC 819. The RFC standardized the naming system for computers on the internet, creating domain names. It specifies that "associated with each domain there is a single person (or office) called the registrar."

The earliest domain names were names of organizations, such as .arpa for the Advanced Research Projects Agency. Feinler switched to a system of naming by generic categories, creating .mil, .gov, .org, .edu, and .com as generic top-level domain. This existed alongside a system of country code top-level domains administered by Postel. Eventually the role of registrar for each of the TLDs was delegated to various universities (the University of Dortmund for .de, Kuwait University for .kw, etc.) and, via US government contracts, to private companies.

=== Commercialization ===
As the internet expanded in the early 1990s, becoming more commercial and international, the US government decided it could no longer provide domain name management free of charge.

From 1991 to 1999, Network Solutions Inc. (NSI) operated the registries for the .com, .net, and .org top-level domains (TLDs). In addition to the function of domain name registry operator, it was also the sole registrar for these domains. However, several companies had developed independent registrar services. In 1996, one such company, Ivan Pope's company, NetNames, developed the concept of a standalone commercial domain name registration service that would sell domain registration and other associated services to the public, effectively establishing the retail arm of an industry with the registries being the wholesalers. NSI assimilated this model, which ultimately led to the separation of registry and registrar functions.

In 1997, PGMedia filed an antitrust suit against NSI citing the DNS root zone as an essential facility, and the US National Science Foundation (NSF) was joined as a defendant in this action. Ultimately, NSI was granted immunity from antitrust litigation, but the litigation created enough pressure to restructure the domain name market.

In October 1998, following pressure from the growing domain name registration business and other interested parties, NSI's agreement with the United States Department of Commerce was amended. This amendment required the creation of a shared registration system that supported multiple registrars. This system officially commenced service on November 30, 1999, under the supervision of the Internet Corporation for Assigned Names and Numbers (ICANN), although there had been several testbed registrars using the system since March 11, 1999. Approximately 2,800 registrars are accredited by ICANN as of 31 March 2024.

Of the registrars who initially entered the market, many have continued to grow and outpace rivals. GoDaddy is the largest registrar managing over 50M .com domains. Other widely used registrars include Tucows (who acquired Enom), Namecheap and Webcentral. A 2026 analysis of ICANN transaction reports covering 676 registrar entities across eight major gTLDs found that registrar activity is highly concentrated, with the top 1% of entities accounting for 51.9% of all new registrations and inbound transfers, and the top 10% for 92.6%. Registrars who initially led the market but later were surpassed by rivals include Network Solutions and Dotster. Domain name registration is frequently offered in conjunction with web development services, and as a result, software-as-a-service (SaaS) website builders such as Squarespace and Wix are among the top domain name registrars worldwide. In addition to domain registration, website-building platforms like Wix, Drupal, and Squarespace commonly provide integrated web hosting, website design tools, e-commerce features, content management capabilities, and security services within a single subscription-based offering.

Each ICANN-accredited registrar must pay a fee of US$4,000 plus a variable fee. In the 2025 financial year, the sum of annual registrar fees were estimated to total US$10.4 million. The competition created by the shared registration system enables end users to choose from many registrars offering a range of related services at varying prices.

== Designated registrar ==
Domain registration information and accreditation is maintained by the domain name registries, which contract with domain registrars to provide registration services to the public. Domain name registrars are organizations that allow individuals or entities (registrants) to register a domain name. An end user selects a registrar to provide the registration service, and that registrar becomes the designated registrar for the domain purchased by the user, also referred to as the Registered Name Holder.

Only the designated registrar may modify or delete information about domain names in a central registry database. It is not unusual for a registered name holder to switch registrars, invoking a domain transfer process between the registrars involved, that is which is governed by domain name transfer policies established by the affiliated registry and ICANN.

When a registrar registers a .com domain name for an end-user, it must pay a maximum annual fee of US$9.59 and for .net the maximum price for one year is set at $9.92 to VeriSign, the registry operator for .com, and a US$0.18 annual administration fee to ICANN. Between 2012 and 2021, the U.S. government set a price cap on the wholesale cost of .com domain registrations at $7.85 per year. Since then, the wholesale cost has increased marginally on an annual basis.

Registrars may offer registration through third party resellers who may not be ICANN-accredited registrars. An end-user either registers directly with a registrar, or indirectly through one or more layers of resellers. As of 2023, the retail cost generally ranges from a low of about $9.70 per year to about $35 per year for a simple .com domain registration, although registrars often discount the price for a registration when ordered with other products such as web hosting services. The price for other gTLD registrations or renewals can vary.

The maximum period of registration for a gTLD domain name is 10 years. Some registrars offer longer periods of up to 100 years, but such offers involve the registrar renewing the registration for their customer every 10 years by themselves. If the registrar is de-accredited or goes out of business the domain name will be transferred to another accredited registrar. The full 100 year registration on such a transferred domain may not apply due to ICANN having a maximum of ten years for a registration.

== DNS hosting ==
Registration of a domain name establishes a set of name server records in the DNS servers of the parent domain, indicating the IP addresses of DNS servers that are authoritative for the domain. This provides a reference for direct queries of domain data.

Registration of a domain does not automatically imply the provision of DNS services for the registered domain. Most registrars do offer DNS hosting as an optional free service for domains registered through them. If DNS services are not offered, or the end-user opts out, the end-user is responsible for procuring or self-hosting DNS services. Registrars require the specification of usually at least two name servers.

== DNSSEC support ==
The Domain Name System Security Extensions (DNSSEC) is a suite of Internet Engineering Task Force (IETF) specifications for securing certain kinds of information provided by the Domain Name System. This involves a registrar processing public key data and creating DS records for addition into the parent zone. All new GTLD registries and registrars must support DNSSEC.

== Domain name transfer ==
A domain name transfer is the process of changing the designated registrar of a domain name. ICANN has defined a Policy on Transfer of Registrations between Registrars. The usual process of a domain name transfer is:

1. The end user verifies that the WHOIS or Registration Data Access Protocol (RDAP) admin contact info is correct, particularly the email address; obtains the authentication code (EPP transfer code) from the old registrar, and removes any domain lock that has been placed on the registration. If the WHOIS or RDAP information had been out of date and is now updated, the end-user should wait 12–24 hours before proceeding further, to allow time for the updated data to propagate. Admin contact info for RDAP can be obtained by using Registration Data Directory Services (RDDS) such as ICANN Lookup.
2. The end user contacts the new registrar with the wish to transfer the domain name to their service, and supplies the authentication code.
3. The gaining Registrar must obtain express authorization from either the Registered Name Holder or the Administrative Contact. A transfer may only proceed if confirmation of the transfer is received by the gaining Registrar from one of these contacts. The authorization must be made via a valid Standardized Form of Authorization, which may be sent e.g. by e-mail to the e-mail addresses listed in the WHOIS or RDAP. The Registered Name Holder or the Administrative Contact must confirm the transfer. The new registrar starts electronically the transfer of the domain with the help of the authentication code (auth code).
4. The old registrar will contact the end user to confirm the authenticity of this request. The end user may have to take further action with the old registrar, such as returning to the online management tools, to re-iterate their desire to proceed, in order to expedite the transfer.
5. The old registrar will release authority to the new registrar.
6. The new registrar will notify the end user of transfer completion. The new registrar may have automatically copied over the domain server information, and everything on the website will continue to work as before. Otherwise, the domain server information will need to be updated with the new registrar.

After this process, the new registrar is the domain name's designated registrar. The process may take about five days. In some cases, the old registrar may intentionally delay the transfer as long as allowable. After transfer, the domain cannot be transferred again for 60 days, except back to the previous registrar. At the ICANN 82 meeting in March 2025, this 60-day transfer lock policy was eliminated, replaced with a 30-day lock period for new registrations or transfers, effective following implementation within 18 months.

If an attempt is made to transfer a domain immediately before it expires, a transfer can in some cases take up to 14 days, meaning that the transfer may not complete before the registration expires. This could result in loss of the domain name registration and failure of the transfer. To avoid this, end users could either transfer well before the expiration date, or renew the registration before attempting the transfer.

If a domain registration expires, irrespective of the reason, it can be difficult, expensive, or impossible for the original owner to get it back. After the expiration date, the domain status often passes through several management phases, often for a period of months; usually it does not simply become generally available.

=== Transfer scams ===
The introduction of a shared registry system opened up the previous domain registration monopoly to new entities known as registrars, which were qualified by ICANN to do business. Many registrars had to compete with each other, and although some companies offered value added services or used viral marketing, others, such as VeriSign and the Domain Registry of America attempted to trick customers to switch from their current registrar using a practice known as domain slamming.

Many of these transfer scams involve a notice sent in the mail, fax, or e-mail. Some scammers contact end-users by telephone (because the contact information is available through WHOIS or Registration Data Directory Services for RDAP) to obtain more information. These notices would include information publicly available from the WHOIS or RDAP database to add to the look of authenticity. The text would include legalese to confuse the end user into thinking that it is an official binding notice. Scam registrars go after domain names that are expiring soon or have recently expired. Domain name expiry dates are readily available via WHOIS or RDAP.

End-users can use domain privacy services which redact contact information and change it with ones provided by the services.

== Drop catcher ==
A drop catcher is a domain name registrar that offers the service of attempting to quickly register a given domain name for a customer if that name becomes available—that is, to "catch" a "dropped" name—when the domain name's registration expires and is then deleted, either because the registrant abandons the domain or because the registrant did not renew the registration prior to deletion.

== Registrar rankings ==
Several organizations post market-share-ranked lists of domain name registrars and numbers of domains registered at each. The published lists differ in which top-level domains (TLDs) they use; in the frequency of updates; and in whether their basic data is absolute numbers provided by registries, or daily changes derived from zone files.

The lists appear to all use at most 16 publicly available generic TLDs (gTLDs) that existed as of December 2009, plus .us. A February 2010 ICANN zone file access concept paper explains that most country code TLD (ccTLD) registries stopped providing zone files in 2003, citing abuse.

Published rankings and reports include:

- Monthly (but with approximately a three-month delay), ICANN posts registry reports created by the registries of all gTLDs. These reports list total numbers of domains registered with each ICANN-accredited registrar, the numbers transferred, renewed and deleted in the period covered by the report.
- Yearly (but covering only the period from 2002 to 2007), DomainTools.com, operated by Name Intelligence, Inc., published registrar statistics. Totals included .com, .net, .org, .info, .biz and .us. It cited "daily changes" (presumably from daily zone files) as the basis for its yearly aggregates.

== ICANN registrar accreditation ==
ICANN registrar accreditation is a process established by the Internet Corporation for Assigned Names and Numbers (ICANN) to ensure that gTLD domain registrars meet specific standards and requirements in providing gTLD domain registration services to domain registrants. The country code ccTLDs typically have their own registrar accreditation processes.

To become an ICANN-accredited domain registrar, companies must undergo a comprehensive and rigorous application process, including a third-party background check and criminal history screening.

The application fee for ICANN Accreditation as of April 12, 2021, is $3,500 which is non-refundable and post successful accreditation the annual fee is $4,000. In addition, registrars are required to provide documentation confirming that they possess access to a minimum working capital of $70,000 at the time of application.

== See also ==
- Drop registrar
- Private sub-domain registry
