= Domain name registry =

Database of domain names and associated registrant information

A domain name registry is a database of all domain names and the associated registrant information in the top level domains of the Domain Name System (DNS) of the Internet that enables third party entities to request administrative control of a domain name. Most registries operate on the top-level and second-level of the DNS.

A registry operator, sometimes called a network information center (NIC), maintains all administrative data of the domain and generates a zone file which contains the addresses of the nameservers for each domain. Each registry is an organization that manages the registration of domain names within the domains for which it is responsible, controls the policies of domain name allocation, and technically operates its domain. It may also fulfill the function of a domain name registrar, or may delegate that function to other entities.

Domain names are managed under a hierarchy headed by the Internet Assigned Numbers Authority (IANA), which manages the top of the DNS tree by administrating the data in the root nameservers. IANA also operates the int registry for intergovernmental organizations, the arpa zone for protocol administration purposes, and other critical zones such as root-servers.net. IANA delegates all other domain name authority to other domain name registries and a full list is available on their web site. Country code top-level domains (ccTLD) are delegated by IANA to national registries such as DENIC in Germany and Nominet in the United Kingdom.

== Operation ==
Some governments own their own domain name registries. Some are co-operatives of Internet service providers (such as DENIC) or not-for profit companies (such as Nominet UK). Others operate as commercial organizations, such as the US registry (nic.us), GoDaddy, domain.com, etc.

The allocated and assigned domain names are made available by registries by use of the WHOIS or its successor Registration Data Access Protocol and via their domain name servers.

Some registries sell the names directly, and others rely on separate entities to sell them. For example, names in the .com top-level domains are in some sense sold "wholesale" at a regulated price by VeriSign, and individual domain name registrars sell names "retail" to businesses and consumers. This retail model has expanded to include platforms like Ionos, Wix, Bluehost, and HostGator, which simplify domain purchasing by acting as accredited registrars for some domains and resellers for others.

== Policies ==
=== Allocation policies ===
Historically, domain name registries operated on a first-come-first-served system of allocation but may reject the allocation of specific domains on the basis of political, religious, historical, legal or cultural reasons. For example, in the United States, between 1996 and 1998, InterNIC automatically rejected domain name applications based on a list of perceived obscenities and sanctioned hate-based domains. However, enforcement was not always consistent. In 2017, a request to register the domain fucknazis.us was first granted and then denied. A challenge to this ruling resulted in elimination of the “seven dirty words” policy for registration of US Domain Names based on first amendment grounds.

Registries may also control matters of interest to their local communities; for example, the German, Japanese and Polish registries have introduced internationalized domain names to allow use of local non-ASCII characters.

=== Dispute policies ===
Domains that are registered with ICANN registrars, generally have to use the Uniform Domain-Name Dispute-Resolution Policy (UDRP), however, Germany's DENIC requires people to use the German civil courts, and Nominet UK deals with intellectual property and other disputes through its own dispute resolution service.

== Third-level domains ==
Domain name registries may also impose a system of third-level domains on users. DENIC, the registry for Germany (.de), does not impose third level domains. AFNIC, the registry for France (.fr), has some third level domains, but not all registrants have to use them.

Many ccTLDs have moved from compulsory third or fourth-level domain to the availability of registrations of second level domains. Among them are .us (April 2002), .mx (May 2009), .co (March 2010), and .uk (June 2014).

== See also ==
- Drop registrar
- Private sub-domain registry
- List of Internet top-level domains
- NIC handle
