= Rae Assist =

Rae Assist was a software developed and distributed by Rae Technology from 1993 to 1995. Rae Assist (or shortly "Assist") was one of the first Personal Information Managers (PIM) and available for Apple Macintosh.

== Origin ==
At the core of Rae Assist was a technology that a group of Apple employees had developed under the direction of Samir Arora. The so-called SOLO (Structure of Linked Objects) architecture was an object-oriented application framework, which could work with a variety of databases, including 4th Dimension and SQL databases, as well as communication-based services like e-mail.

After Samir Arora co-founded Rae Technology along with Dave Dell'Aquila and Dave Kleinberg in 1992 as a spin-off from Apple Computer, the first release of Rae Assist was due in 1993.

== Release history ==
Rae Assist 1.0 and 1.02

In 1993 Rae Assist 1.0 was released, followed shortly by release 1.0.2 at the beginning of the year 1994.

Rae Assist 1.0.2 combined several functions in one program and automatically linked contact and company information. The usage of 5 MB disk space and a minimum of 2.5 MB RAM were seen as cons at the time. A review in MacWorld found Rae Assist "innovative" but "too slow".

Rae Assist 1.0.2 came with combined contact management, scheduling, and note taking. It used the 4th Dimension database engine and was targeted at PowerBook users. It had a list price of US$199.

Rae Assist 1.5

With the release of Rae Assist 1.5 in 1995 Rae Technology addressed performance issues and improved some features.

Rae Assist 2.0

Rae Assist 2.0 was scheduled to be released in the 4th quarter of 1995. It was rewritten in PowerMac code and "smaller and faster, coming in under 1.5 MB with a launch time of 3 seconds". Colour, windows resizing and floating palettes were also introduced.

Also in 1995 and as a cooperation with CE Software Rae Technology had started an application called DayAssist to integrate Assist into QuickMail.

== NetObjects Fusion ==
Rae Assist 2.0 was the last release and Rae Technology was soon to close its doors as a software vendor. The Personal Information Manager market was emerging yet small with competitors like Symantec and Lotus.

Samir Arora, his brother Sal Arora and David Kleinberg, who ran Rae Technology, saw the World Wide Web on the rise. Together with Clement Mok they founded NetObjects, Inc. in 1995 to market one of the first web site building tools, NetObjects Fusion, which also should rely on the SOLO framework.
