= 24 Hours in Cyberspace =

24 Hours in Cyberspace (February 8, 1996) was "the largest one-day online event" up to that date, headed by photographer Rick Smolan with Jennifer Erwitt, Tom Melcher, Samir Arora and Clement Mok. The project brought together the world's top 1,000 photographers, editors, programmers, and interactive designers to create a digital time capsule of online life."

== Overview ==
24 Hours in Cyberspace was an online project that took place on the then-active website, cyber24.com (and is still online at a mirror website maintained by Georgia Tech). At the time, it was billed as the "largest collaborative Internet event ever", involving thousands of photographers from all over the world, including 150 of the world's top photojournalists. Then-Second Lady Tipper Gore was one of its photographers. In addition, then-Vice President of the United States Al Gore contributed the introductory essay to the Earthwatch section of the website. In this essay, he discusses the impact of the Internet on the environment, education, and increased communication between people.

The goal was not to show pictures of websites and computer monitors, but rather images of people whose lives were affected by the use of the growing Internet. Photographs were sent digitally to editors working in real time to choose the best pictures to put on the project's website. The website received more than 4 million hits in the 24 hours that the project was active.

24 Hours in Cyberspace served as a cover story for U.S. News & World Report.

The technological infrastructure of the project was provided by a startup company spinoff from Apple Computer named NetObjects that was founded by Samir Arora, David Kleinberg, Clement Mok and Sal Arora. The system supplied by NetObjects allowed Smolan's international network of editors and photojournalists to submit text and images through web forms; it ran on Unix, relied on a database for content storage (Illustra) and used templating for easy and near-instantaneous page generation that obviated the need for the site's editorial staff to have any coding skills. NetObjects was first to create the technology that would enable a team of the world's top picture editors and writers to become instant Web page designers. It let them do what they do best—edit and write—and automatically generate finished, sophisticated Web pages that millions of people were able to see only minutes after they were designed. Three million people clicked onto the 24 Hours site; the blaze of publicity surrounding the 24 Hours in Cyberspace project helped NetObjects raise $5.4 million in venture capital.

The project reportedly cost as much as $5 million, and was funded with assistance from 50 companies, mostly in the form of loans of computer hardware and technology experts. Adobe Systems, Sun Microsystems and Kodak were listed as major supporters.

== Book ==
A companion book by Rick Smolan and Jennifer Erwitt was published in 1996. It contains 200 photographs from the over 200,000 which were taken on that day. It also contains a CD with the full contents of the original website.

== Smithsonian ==
A photographic exhibition was unveiled at the Smithsonian Institution's National Museum of American History on 23 January 1997, featuring 70 photos from the project by the 24 Hours in Cyberspace team, Rick Smolan, Jennifer Erwitt, Samir Arora, Clement Mok and Vic Zaud. It was introduced by then Vice President Al Gore who was also given a copy of the book and CD.
