= Domain.com =

Web company

Domain.com, LLC
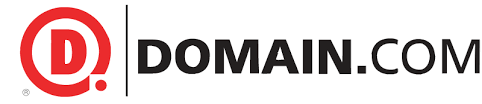
- Company type: Private Company
- Industry: Domain Registrar, Web Hosting
- Predecessor: Dotster
- Founded: 1999
- Founder: George DeCarlo
- Headquarters: Jacksonville, Florida, United States
- Key people: Sharon Rowlands (CEO); Karen Dixon (Vice President); Jason Miner (General Manager)
- Parent: Newfold Digital
- Website: www.domain.com

Domain.com is a domain registrar and web hosting company headquartered in Jacksonville, Florida, and is a subsidiary of Newfold Digital.

== History ==
Domain.com's origins existed as part of the Dotster brand, founded by George DeCarlo in 1998. A graduate of the University of Portland, DeCarlo launched Dotster as a project of the Columbia Analytical Services before being purchased by Baker Capital in 2004.

In 2005, Dotster introduced a new domain technology that provided relevant search results based on domains or keywords entered by its users. It was awarded the Domain Pioneer Award from Verisign at the "25 Years of .com Gala" in 2010.

In 2011, Dotster and its subsidiaries, My Domain and Netfirms, were acquired by Endurance International Group. Among the domain names owned by Dotster was www.domain.com, which was determined by leadership to be the strongest branding for their attempt to put more emphasis on the domain registration growth. In 2012, Dotster began migrating domain accreditation to Domain.com, LLC, making it the official registrar for the company's domain business.

On July 7, 2025, Domain.com announced its merger with Network Solutions, a brand under Newfold Digital. This merger is part of a series of similar consolidations, including the previous mergers of Register.com and Web.com with Network Solutions.

== Services ==
Although they are known predominantly as domain registrar, the company also offers resources for shared hosting, WordPress hosting, and SSL certificates. They also are responsible for launching the .xyz top-level domain to increase the number of short, brandable URLs available to the public.
