= Trellix (1995–2004) =

Internet software company

- Company type: Software company (formerly); Subsidiary
- Industry: Software, Web hosting
- Founded: 1997
- Founder: Dan Bricklin (for Trellix Web)
- Defunct: 2004
- Fate: Acquired by Interland (Web.com) in 2003, then closed as a subsidiary in 2004. Patented products still used by Web.com.
- Headquarters: Concord, Massachusetts, U.S.
- Area served: Worldwide (via internet)
- Products: Trellix (intranet management), Trellix Web (client-based web publishing software), Trellix Web Express (web-based publishing software), Trellix Site Builder
- Services: Online publishing tools and web hosting
- Owner: Interland (later Web.com) (2003-2004)
- Parent: Web.com (formerly Interland)

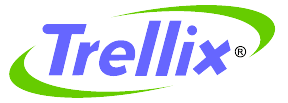

Trellix was a software company whose products allowed web users to set up personal websites with the use of online publishing tools.

Located in Concord, Massachusetts, the company was founded in 1997 and was purchased by Interland (now Web.com) in 2003.

In March, 2004 Interland closed the Trellix subsidiary.

== Trellix Web ==
Founded in 1995 by software pioneer Dan Bricklin, Trellix's first product was Trellix, a program designed to allow companies to develop and manage information on corporate intranets. Many users of the program desired to use this same idea to create personal websites. This led to the creation of Trellix Web (codenamed "Brooklyn"), a downloadable, client-based software tool. Trellix offered several versions of Trellix Web software:

- Free versions (2.0–2.7) that would publish only to specific web publishers with which Trellix had arranged business deals, such as Fortune City and Tripod. Dozens of co-branded versions of the free Trellix Web software were released for various business partners, the most popular of which was included with Dell and HP computers and with Corel's WordPerfect with v 2.0.
- Paid versions. The paid versions were available online sold directly by Trellix, and sold with a book: Trellix Web Site Creation Kit book (with CD-ROM) had two different versions. Though similar, the publishing options were completely different.
  - Prentice Hall Edition of 2.7PA allowed the user to define a host (per page 121)
  - Prentice Hall Edition of 2.7 version, like the free version of the software, was tied to only certain hosts.

The only version of Trellix that was sold to consumers was 2.7 and only the Publish Anywhere (PA) version allowed the user to define the host. Version 2.7PA was not included in bundled software packages and it is the only version of Trellix that can still publish to new sites.

Eventually, Trellix completely abandoned development of "Trellix Web" in favor of "Trellix Web Express", the online software, selling the rights to "Trellix Web" to GlobalSCAPE, Inc. so the product could be sold under the name CuteSITE Builder (CSB). This software was sold as version 3, 4 and 5, but was discontinued June 30, 2006 which ended the line of PC installed Trellix software.

Support for the free and paid versions of the PC software is still available on free support sites and forums.

== Trellix Web Express ==
In 2001, Trellix developed Trellix Web Express, a web-based version of the Trellix Web software, based in part on software purchased from Lycos' Tripod.com division. (This deal was structured such that Tripod, at the time one of the largest homepage providers online, would be the initial licensee of the new product.) Utilizing JavaScript and allowing published changes to be seen in real-time, Trellix Web Express was designed to be easy to use without having to download a fairly large client program. Some free Web portals still use Trellix Web Express, although it is often co-branded to remove the Trellix name from the product.

At its peak, Trellix developed the Web Express product in English, Spanish, and Portuguese. However, work on the non-English versions was not profitable and was discontinued after the 3.x release.

By 2003, EarthLink was offering use of Trellix Site Builder to its customers.

In 2007 Trellix Web Express appeared as "Site Builder" or "Trellix Site Builder". The corresponding web site www.trellix.com now links directly to the offers of Web.com.

Trellix also licensed the rights to Blogger, a popular blog-development tool, in April 2001.

== Interland ==
In 2003, Web hosting company Interland, which changed its name to Web.com after buying the company with that name, purchased Trellix, and continues to use patented products of Trellix today. As of June 30, 2006, Web.com refused to continue the licensing arrangement with GlobalSCAPE for the PC installed version of the Trellix Web software, retitled CuteSITE Builder (CSB), per notice posted on the GlobalSCAPE support forum.
