= Brandjacking =

Assuming the online identity of another entity

Brandjacking is an activity whereby someone acquires or otherwise assumes the online identity of another entity for the purposes of acquiring that person's or business's brand equity. The term combines the notions of 'branding' and 'hijacking', and has been used since at least 2007 when it appeared in Business Week referencing the term used in a publication by the firm MarkMonitor (MarkMonitor and its PR firm, the Zeno Group, coined the phrase; MarkMonitor registered "BrandJacking Index" as a trademark, but not the term "brandjacking" on its own). The tactic is often associated with use of individual and corporate identities on social media or Web 2.0 sites, as described in Quentin Langley's 2014 book Brandjack, and may be used alongside more conventional (offline) campaign activities.

While similar to cybersquatting, identity theft or phishing in nature and in possible tactics, brandjacking is usually particular to a politician, celebrity or business and more indirect in its nature. A brandjacker may attempt to use the reputation of its target for selfish reasons or seek to damage the reputation of its target for hostile, malicious or for political or campaigning reasons. These reasons may not be directly financial, but the effects on the original brand-holder may often include financial loss - for example, negative publicity may result in the termination of a celebrity's sponsorship deal, or, for a corporation, potentially lead to lost sales or a reduced share price.

== Brandjacking examples ==
- Coca-Cola: In 2013, a commercial titled "The Bitter Taste of Sugar", produced for Oxfam (Oxfam Novib Netherlands), parodied a Coca-Cola Zero commercial to draw attention to the company's unsustainable business practices.
- Starbucks: In 2006, a YouTube-hosted video presented a spoof advertisement for a Starbucks Frappuccino, underlining the contrast between consumption and poverty.
- Nestle: In March 2010, Greenpeace campaigners used a YouTube video that parodied Nestlé's KitKat "Take a Break" advertising, to draw attention to the multinational's use of palm oil from unsustainable operations in Indonesia and the consequent impact on orangutan habitats. Protesters outside Nestlé's UK head office in Croydon carried signs with the words "Give me a break" and "Killer" printed in the distinctive red and white Gill Sans font.
- ExxonMobil: In 2008, a Twitter account (@ExxonMobilCorp) was set up purporting to express the views of an official spokesperson for the oil company, only for it later to be exposed as fake.
- BP: Also on Twitter, @BPglobalPR is a satirical account that grew in popularity during the 2010 Deepwater Horizon oil spill, attracting more followers than the official BP Twitter account.
- Politicians: Fake Facebook pages were created for US President Barack Obama and US Republican governor Sarah Palin.
- Fake blogs: These may be considered a form of brandjacking if created by a critic or opponent of the person or brand supposed to be behind the blog.
- Affiliate brand bidding: This is a tactic used by certain affiliate marketers, but regarded by some as unethical or Black Hat. It involves bidding on trademarked terms to intercept search engine traffic and redirect users to affiliate links to secure a commission.
- Colleges and universities: In 2008, college guidebook company College Prowler created hundreds of Facebook groups purporting to consist of actual incoming first-year students of various universities in order to surreptitiously gather their personal data and promote the business.
- Mattel (2011): In June 2011, Greenpeace activists launched a campaign against Mattel's use of a packaging supplier, APP, said to be desecrating Indonesian rainforests, using images of Mattel dolls Barbie and Ken. A Greenpeace video showed Ken dumping Barbie ("I don't date girls who are into deforestation"), the group created a mock Twitter feud and a stunt involving Barbie in a pink bulldozer, and unfurled a banner on the wall of Mattel’s Los Angeles headquarters; some 500,000 people sent protest emails to Mattel. In October 2011, Mattel announced a global policy to keep rainforest destruction out of its supply chains. Brandjack author Quentin Langley praised Greenpeace for its integration of online (YouTube, Twitter) and offline (stunts, etc.).
- Mattel (2023): In a 2023 action by the Barbie Liberation Organization, actress Daryl Hannah, posing as a spokesperson for Mattel introduced the collection of biodegradable dolls and announced in a short video that the company would stop using plastic by 2030. This was one of several videos produced by Yellow Dot Studios as part of the BLO's campaign to leverage the publicity surrounding the launch of the Barbie film to raise concerns about the pervasive use of plastics. Tying in with the satirical campaign is a hoax website bearing heavy resemblance to the real Mattel corporate site, where they issued a fake press release for the fictitious biodegradable Barbie line.

== Brandjacking avoidance ==
Brandjacking avoidance may include:

- Pre-emptive registration of brand names and sub-brands as screen names on social media sites.
- Staying vigilant
- Use of social media and general media monitoring tools to seek evidence of infringement
- Legal action against those seen as responsible for the infringement.

However, action against the brandjackers and their supporters can actually draw attention to the problem (the Streisand effect). For example, following Greenpeace's KitKat campaign, Nestlé had the video removed from YouTube, but Greenpeace quickly re-posted it to video-sharing site Vimeo.com and highlighted the attempted censorship using Twitter and other social media. Attempts by Nestlé to constrain user activity on its Facebook fan page further fanned the controversy.

== Ethics considerations ==
Brandjacking, which involves the unauthorized use or alteration of a company’s brand identity, is a subject of discussion in both academic and professional research due to its potential to influence public opinion. What is brandjacking? Origin, conceptualization and effects of perceived dimensions of truth, mockery and offensiveness defines brandjacking as a form of anti-commercial parody that changes the original meaning of an advertisement in order to criticize a company or draw attention to perceived concerns about the brand.

One commonly cited concern includes deception. Some forms of brand hijacking, such as fake accounts, phishing, cybersquatting, and impersonation, may confuse consumers into believing they are interacting with the legitimate company. According to the study, Redefining brand hijacking from a non-collaborative brand co-creation perspective these practices have the potential to damage trust in both the targeted brand and the broader marketplace.

Another ethical issue discussed in research is reputational harm. Research in What is brandjacking? Origin, conceptualization and effects of perceived dimensions of truth, mockery and offensiveness found that when audiences perceived truthfulness or offensiveness in brandjacked content, attitudes toward the targeted brand became more negative, suggesting that brandjacking campaigns can influence public perceptions even when they are framed as parody or criticism.

Research notes that not all brandjacking is motivated by fraud or personal gain. For instance, the article What is brandjacking? Origin, conceptualization and effects of perceived dimensions of truth, mockery and offensiveness discusses examples of brandjacking used by activist groups to criticize corporate environmental or social practices via altered advertisements, suggesting it can function as a tool of protest and accountability.

The article Redefining brand hijacking from a non-collaborative brand co-creation perspective proposes that brand hijacking is an ethically complex phenomenon, neither entirely harmful nor entirely beneficial, noting that while certain types may involve deception and consumer confusion, others may represent protest, criticism, or stakeholder attempts to redefine brand meaning.

== See also ==
- Culture jamming
- Cybersquatting
- Fake blog
- Identity theft
- Parody account
- Phishing
- Subvertising
