= NetObjects Fusion =

- NetObjects Fusion 2013
- Developer: NetObjects, Inc.
- Stable release: 2015 / May 24, 2015
- Operating system: Microsoft Windows (all versions, though some users have reported problems using it with Windows 10); Mac OS (versions 1–3)
- Type: Web design
- License: Proprietary
- Website: NetObjects

NetObjects Fusion (NOF) is a web design tool, from 1996 to 2001 developed and distributed by NetObjects, Inc., marketed from 2001 until 2009 by Web.com (formerly dubbed Website Pros), which bought the application in 2001, and from July 2009 on distributed again by the re-established NetObjects, Inc.

NetObjects Fusion has a graphical user interface and generates HTML or (since release 11) XHTML through its own proprietary database.

== Origin ==
The origins of NetObjects Fusion date back to the 1980s. At Apple Computer, Samir Arora, David Kleinberg, and Sal Arora conducted research on early information navigation applications before the term "browser" was coined and before the invention of Mosaic.

Development was transferred to the new-founded company Rae Technology, a spin-off from Apple Computer. At Rae, the two Arora brothers and David Kleinberg developed an object-oriented environment called SOLO (Structure of Linked Objects), which is the technological basis of NetObjects Fusion.

NetObjects, Inc. was founded in 1995 with an initial investment by Rae Technology to complete the development of NetObjects Fusion.

== Reputation and market share ==
Clement Mok, Victor Zaud, Karen Rall, and Susan Kare, interactivity designers, were contracted to accomplish the development of NetObjects Fusion and design its interface.

The hopes of the newly founded company were high, and the reactions of the market and IT observers to the first two releases of NetObjects Fusion in 1996 and 1997 were very positive. Among other awards NetObjects Fusion received were InfoWorld's Analyst Choice Award and PC Magazine's Editors' Choice.

After a few years of great success, NOF fell back in market share and reputation against the competition, mainly Dreamweaver, though it always kept a dedicated user community. In the last few years, sales showed a slight downward tendency, staying flat in 2008 with a revenue of $2.5 million. Revenue from software sales was $2.44 million in 2007 (no new version of NetObjects Fusion was released), down from $3.58 million in 2006 and $3.86 million in 2005.

NetObjects Fusion reached the biggest resonance in Germany, reaching nearly two-thirds of the market by the end of the 1990s. English and German are the only languages in which NOF is currently distributed.

== Interface ==
NetObjects Fusion is not an HTML editor but an HTML generator. NOF comes with a graphical user interface similar to desktop publishing applications like PageMaker or InDesign. The user has pixel-level control over a WYSIWYG page layout. User actions on pages get written into a proprietary database, which generates HTML code.

The software was targeted at users who have a traditional print design, authoring or journalistic background. The developers of NetObjects Fusion intended to give them a user interface and a workflow they are used to.

After the first use of a pre-release version in 1996, photojournalist Rick Smolan said: "NetObjects was the only tool that would enable a team of the world's top picture editors and writers to become instant Web page designers. It let them do what they do best—edit and write—and automatically generated finished, sophisticated Web pages that millions of people were able to see only minutes after they were designed."

The NetObjects-specific graphical interface proved to be a barrier for programmers who wanted full access to HTML. An external editor was needed to change the HTML that NetObjects Fusion generated. Manually changed HTML code cannot be imported back into NetObjects Fusion.

With later versions, more and more so-called "insertion points" have been implemented where pieces of HTML can be inserted into the NOF-generated code (like between HEAD tags or inside BODY tags). Release 11 comes with HTML inspectors for every object on the page and limited possibilities for editing code in the Code view. Code generated by NOF remains excluded from editing in Code view.

== Views ==
The workspace of NetObjects Fusion offers different views of the project, similar to project management software.

In Site view, the web project is laid out and structured (NOF is a site-oriented HTML generator). The visualization technology of NetObjects Fusion has been patented. In a hierarchical tree structure, pages can be built and arranged. The folder structure on the web server can follow this layout or can vary – leaving the site structure only as a logical structure.

In Page view, the desktop publishing model is most obvious. The user operates with a draw-based layout editor very similar to Desktop publishing (DTP) or Computer-Aided Design (CAD) software. Toolbars offer text, image, table and other choices to design a page. Since version 8, basic bitmap editing capabilities are integrated in the image tool.

All objects can be placed accurately with pixel-level control on the page, can be aligned or evenly distributed.

With version 11, NetObjects Fusion moved along to CSS-based layout to enable pixel-level control of all objects on the page. According to the vendor, the code generation has been completely re-written to this end. Earlier versions generated complex hidden tables and blind GIFs for layout.

The Team Fusion Client (coming with the NetObjects Authoring Server) had used CSS-driven layout at least since 1999.

NetObjects Fusion release 11 still offers table-based layout as an option to maintain upwards compatibility to complex projects built with earlier versions.

Page design is divided into an interior layout and an outside masterborder area. Masterborders allow designers to have exactly the same set of objects on a given number of pages.

A tab on page view starts an integrated browser (Microsoft Internet Explorer) to show an immediate preview without leaving NOF in Internet Explorer. Netobjects Fusion 11 can show a preview also with Firefox up to 3.6.

Style view offers pre-installed or online-offered sets of designs with banners, navigation bars, backgrounds, text styles and so on. Styles can also be completely user-defined and based on Cascading Style Sheets.

Other views include the Asset view, where image and media files are managed; the Publish view, which allows for local previewing or remote publishing with a built-in FTP module; and the Online view, which was added with NetObjects Fusion MX (6) to provide access to third-party modules, tutorials, or customer support.

== Strengths ==
The user interface of NetObjects Fusion has been praised as elegant and user-friendly by users and observers. The changed and extended interface of the versions since release 10 was reviewed less favourably.

NetObjects Fusion proved to be flexible for small to medium-sized projects. For instance, novices are able to build a small site with styles that come with the product, and set up a simple online shop with the built-in e-commerce engine. Experts can take advantage of NOF's layout capabilities and use it as a mere front-end to PHP/SQL database or advanced e-commerce solutions. According to Web.com, NOF 11 now allows to connect to any "commercially relevant databases".

Third-party support was one of the highlights in earlier times, but seems to have been discouraged by Website Pros' policy to offer their own components. Many formerly popular components by third-party vendors like Coolmaps or Bitmotion have been discontinued or remain in the state of just maintaining compatibility to new versions of NetObjects Fusion without further development.

== Limitations ==
Scalability was a known problem of early versions of NetObjects Fusion. Depending on complexity and the user's working method, a single project might have reached its limits of performance and handling at a few pages. Bigger sites had to be broken into several projects causing increased management effort, especially for links and menus. Newer releases proved to be a little bit more robust. With release 11, relying on improved database connectivity and the ability to integrate XML-files into any objects on pages, scalability is not seen as an issue any more by the vendor. Though at least one user thinks otherwise.

The limited access to HTML is seen as a critical flaw by many web developers. However, NetObjects Fusion was not designed to this end.

== Latest developments: CSS, XHTML, nPower, Essentials ==
Since the acquisition of NetObjects Fusion, Website Pros kept a steady pace of new releases with enhanced functionalities. Engineering had been outsourced to Romania. In 2008 Web.com "terminated the outsourced software development" and decided to "use existing in-house resources to assist with the future development" of NetObjects Fusion.

Beginning with version 10, NetObjects Fusion improved compliance with modern web standards. NOF 10 (2006) came with full W3C and CSS 2.1 compliance and with a major overhaul of the user interface. However, CSS could be applied to text formatting only and page design stayed table-based. Release 11 (2008) offered CSS-positioned layout and publishing with XHTML 1.0 compliance.

Enabling typical Web 2.0 sites, a collection of AJAX widgets like accordions and tagged panels have also been introduced with release 11.

Starting with release 9, Website Pros also distributed "NetObjects nPower", a collaborative content management solution, to use with NetObjects Fusion. The development of nPower was stopped after the two releases for NetObjects 9 and 10.

In November 2007, the basic version NetObjects Fusion Essentials was introduced for free download. Essentials is identical with NOF release 7.5.

In July 2009, NetObjects, Inc. was re-established as an independent company. It acquired all NOF-related assets from Web.com. for approximately $4.0 million and released version 12 on December 31, 2010.

== Support ==
Support is granted by an active user community in newsgroups. Some web sites like gotFusion, Beyond Fusion, German Forum / NOF Community, German Forum / NOF Schule or NOF-Club (Germany) offer third-party support.

The publication of books covering NetObjects Fusion has decreased with shrinking market share. In January 2009, McGraw-Hill published NetObjects Fusion 11 in their "How to Do Everything" series.

NetObjects Fusion 2015 appears to be the final release and some users have reported problems running it under Windows 10.

== Versions ==
All versions have been released in English and German. The given release year is for the English versions.

- NetObjects Fusion 1 (1996) (Windows/Mac)
- NetObjects Fusion 2 (1997) (Windows/Mac)
- NetObjects Fusion 3 (1998) (Windows/Mac)
- NetObjects Fusion 4 (1999) (Windows)
- NetObjects Fusion 5 (2000) (Windows) Review
- NetObjects Fusion MX (2001) (Windows) Review
- NetObjects Fusion 7 (2002) (Windows)
- NetObjects Fusion 7.5 (2003) (Windows)
- NetObjects Fusion 8 (2004) (Windows)
- NetObjects Fusion 9 (2005) (Windows)
- NetObjects Fusion 10 (2006) (Windows)
- NetObjects Fusion 11 (2008) (Windows)
- NetObjects Fusion XII (2010) (Windows) Review
- NetObjects Fusion 2013 (2013) (Windows)
- NetObjects Fusion 2015 (2015) (Windows)

== See also ==
- Web design program

== Sources and links ==
- http://netobjects.com (Product homepage)
- Webster, Timothy (1996). NetObjects Fusion Handbook. Indianapolis: Hayden Books. ISBN 1-56830-327-0.
- Gassaway, Stella (1997). Killer Web Design: NetObjects Fusion. Foreword by Clement Mok. Indianapolis: Hayden Books. ISBN 1-56830-340-8.
- NetObjects (2005). NetObjects Fusion 9 User Manual. Website Pros, Inc. ASIN B000FDVK9C.
- Plotkin, David (2009). NetObjects Fusion 11. How to Do Everything.. New York: McGraw-Hill. ISBN 978-0-07-149849-4.
