= Domain Name Rights Coalition =

Non-profit organization

- Formation: 1996; 29 years ago
- Founders: Kathy Kleiman
- Legal status: 501(c)(3) nonprofit organization
- Purpose: To represent the interests of domain name holders (registrants) in domain name policy development.
- Leader: Kathy Kleiman, Mikki Barry
- Website: www.dnrc.tech

The Domain Name Rights Coalition is an American nonprofit organization founded in 1996 by Kathryn Kleiman and Mikki Barry to protect the interests of domain name registrants in Domain Name System policy development.

== 1996-2004: First iteration ==
The organization was established to educate Internet users about the need to protect Internet communications; to ensure that governance of the Internet is democratic and representative of the broadest group of individuals, small and large businesses, and public interest and consumer groups; and to ensure that domain name and trademark disputes appropriately recognize the traditional balance of free speech and narrow trademark protection.

Its original directors were Mike Doughney, Kathryn Kleiman, and Harold Feld. Subsequent directors were Dan Steinberg, Jay Fenello, Bret Fausett, and Karl Auerbach.

In a 1999 House hearing, Barry said the organization was primarily founded to respond to Network Solution's domain name dispute policy which she said "stifled the rights of individuals and small businesses to choose domain names."

The organization continues to exist in 2024.

== 2018-present: Relaunch ==
The organization relaunched in 2018, led by Kathryn Kleiman, as a think tank, supporting research and writing on issues of importance in ICANN and other domain name areas. The organization now works with professors, researchers and advocates around the world to build a base of research and white papers to inform and support the work of the ICANN community and others committed to building fair, balanced and principles rules for the Internet and the Domain Name System.
