= HostGator =

American web-hosting provider founded in 2002

HostGator.com, LLC
- Type: Subsidiary
- Industry: Web hosting
- Founded: October 22, 2002; 24 years ago
- Founder: Brent Oxley
- Headquarters: Houston, Texas, United States
- Products: Web services, Cloud services
- Revenue: $100 million (2012)
- Number of employees: 1,000 (2012)
- Parent: Endurance International Group (2012–present)
- Website: www.hostgator.com

HostGator is a Houston-based provider of shared, reseller, virtual private server, and dedicated web hosting with an additional presence in Austin, Texas.

== History ==
HostGator was founded in October 2002 by Brent Oxley, who was then a student at Florida Atlantic University. In 2006, the company moved from the original office in Boca Raton, Florida to a new 20,000 square foot building in Houston, Texas. In June 2006, the company opened its first international office in Canada.

In 2008, Inc. Magazine ranked HostGator in its list of fastest growing companies at 21st in the United States, and 1st in the Houston-Sugar Land-Baytown, Texas area. The same year, HostGator decided to make its hosting service green by working with Integrated Ecosystem Market Services.

In 2008, HostGator prepared for competition with companies touting themselves as providing "unlimited" hosting services. Founder Brent Oxley was adamant about being able to back up an "unlimited" option prior to offering a service named as such, and increased staffing. He suggested that this move increased sales by at least 30%.

In 2010, an office was added in Austin, Texas. In May 2011, HostGator started operations in India with an office in Nashik, Maharashtra and a data center.

On July 13, 2012, HostGator was sold to Endurance International Group (EIG) for an aggregate purchase price of $299.8 million, of which $227.3 million was paid in cash at the closing. On 21 June 2012, CEO and founder Brent Oxley announced the sale of HostGator, and advised employees and users not to worry in part because Oxley would still own the buildings HostGator used. He said he wanted to travel the world before he had children. He was also candid about the failures in creating stable billing and registration section of HostGator, and hoped that Endurance might fix those.

In 2015, HostGator launched Optimized WP, a set of tools for building and maintaining WordPress websites. By the end of 2015, EIG launched local HostGator sites in Brazil, Russia, India, China, Turkey and Mexico. As of 2019, HostGator also offered a web hosting service in the United Kingdom and Australia.

== Incidents ==
=== 2006 Trojan attack ===
In 2006, HostGator suffered from a Trojan attack that affected more than 200 machines.

=== 2012 social engineering attack ===
In May 2012, the computer hacker group UGNazi claimed responsibility for hacking the web server of the web host billing software developer WHMCS in an apparent social engineering attack involving HostGator. A member of the group Cosmo called WHMCS's hosting provider impersonating a senior employee. They were subsequently granted root access to WHMCS's web server after providing information for identity verification. UGNazi later leaked publicly WHMCS's SQL database containing user information and 500,000 customer credit cards, website files, and cPanel configuration. After this issue, WHMCS emailed members to change their passwords.

=== 2013 service outages ===
Since its acquisition by Endurance International, HostGator has suffered an increased incidence of server outages and downtime. Notably, on August 2, 2013 and December 31, 2013, Endurance International Group’s data center in Provo, Utah, experienced network outages that affected thousands of customers of Bluehost, HostGator, Hostmonster and JustHost.

=== 2019 ===
In January 2019, TechCrunch reported that Paulos Yibelo, a well-known bug hunter found serious vulnerabilities at Bluehost, DreamHost, OVH, iPage and HostGator.
