= Web.com (1995–2007) =

American web hosting and e-commerce company

- Industry: Web hosting e-commerce Domain Registration
- Founded: 1997 as Web Internet, LLC
- Headquarters: Bethel, CT, USA
- Key people: Will Pemble, CEO; Kathleen Trahey Weis Chief Operating Officer
- Products: Domain Name Registrations, Web Hosting
- Website: www.web.com

Web Internet LLC (Web.com) was formed in 1997 as a joint venture between Robert Friedman and Web Service Company. Mr. Friedman served as Web.com’s first CEO. Web Service Company held a majority stake in the company. Bill Bloomfield was the President of Web Service Company and effectively served as the primary business partner to Mr. Friedman. Web Service Company was the second largest coin-operated laundry machine company in the U.S. and held a trademark on the "WEB" brand based on the initials of its founder, William E. Bloomfield, Sr. Trademark ownership resulted in the company's acquisition of the Web.com domain.

Web.com initially launched as a web portal, offering paid search results in partnership with idealab! company GoTo.com, a shopping directory, comparison shopping engine, as well as a free web-based @web.com email service in multiple languages in partnership with CommTouch. The company also offered WebAddress, a service providing simple yourname.web.com website addresses. These services helped Web.com achieve top 500 status on Media Metrix U.S. website scoring list but did not result in a viable business. The company received an acquisition offer from NetZero in 1999 but did not accept the offer.

Web.com hired Will Pemble as CEO in late 1999 to establish a geographic footprint in the San Francisco Bay Area and accelerate growth. Mr. Pemble led the expansion of Web.com's domain name registration business and the development of web hosting services, which became the core product offerings of the company. Web.com received acquisition offers from Gil Amelio, a former CEO of Apple Computer, via his Beneventure Capital VC firm, and from Bill Gross’ idealab! in early 2000. Web.com initially accepted the idealab! offer and Web.com’s employees began working at idealab!’s headquarters in Pasadena, CA. However, Web.com rescinded the offer acceptance prior to deal closure.

In 2004, Mr. Pemble purchased Web Services Company, Inc.’s majority equity stake in the company via a leveraged buyout, with Web Service Company converting equity to debt. Shortly after purchasing Web.com, Mr. Pemble founded Perfect Privacy, LLC, a subsidiary of Web.com pioneering private domain name registration services to customers of Web.com.

Web.com was sold to Interland, Inc. in 2005 in a complex transaction involving the four remaining Web.com equity shareholders and assumption of substantial debts owed to Web Service Company. Following the sale, Interland changed its name to Web.com. The company maintained services including do-it-yourself and professional website design, web hosting, e-commerce, web marketing, and e-mail. As of March 2007, there were approximately 166,000 paid hosting subscribers.

Along with various web products and services, Web.com provided small businesses, entrepreneurs and consumers with advice and tips for developing a strong online presence. It owned the brands Web.com, Interland, Trellix, and HostPro.

On September 30, 2007, Web.com merged with Website Pros, forming the new Web.com.

== History ==
The company traces its corporate roots to MicronPC, a multi-billion PC manufacturer. MicronPC entered the web services industry with the acquisition of HostPro in 1999. Two years later, they merged with Interland, Inc., a public company based in Atlanta, Georgia. The combined company retained the Interland name and sold the PC business to focus on Internet hosting. Interland's primary business was providing web services, such as shared and dedicated hosting. Interland acquired numerous hosting companies between the years 2001 and 2006, including Worldwide Internet Publishing Company, Innerhost, Dialtone, Interland, Burlee, Trellix, Communitech and WazooWeb. In August 2005, Interland's board of directors decided to bring in new management with the goal of turning around the company. It removed its former CEO, Joel Kocher, and replaced him with Jeff Stibel. Over the next several months the company also brought in a new Chief Technology Officer, Vikas Rijsinghani (former founder and CTO of VerticalOne) and a new Chief Marketing Officer, Judy Hackett (former CMO of CareerBuilder). The company acquired Web.com in December 2005 for $4.8 million and changed its name from Interland to Web.com.

Web.com held 21 registered patents and claimed to have the primary underlying technology for various aspects of web hosting, software as a service, customer-facing control panels, and website builders. Some of these patents were licensed to Hostopia, a wholesale web hosting provider. On February 1, 2007, Netcraft named Web.com one of the most reliable hosting companies.

When the company was known as Interland, the stock had risen to meteoric levels and then suffered with the "Dot-com bubble" and was ranked among the 10 worst performances for a United States listed company. But since the company brought on new management and changed its name to Web.com, the stock price recovered. At the time of the merger with Website Pros, the company's stock closed at $7.15, which represented more than a threefold increase since new management joined in August 2005. According to the company's financials, the last four quarters showed revenue and subscriber growth at Web.com, despite having consistently lost revenues and subscribers prior to the turnaround. During the first quarter of 2007, the company announced a profit and earnings growth but the second quarter of 2007 the company reported a loss, mainly due to merger related costs.

== Legal ==
The company had been involved with various lawsuits, some of these predate the web.com acquisition:

- Novell brought an action against Interland in 1999 claiming underpayment of royalties. It made an out-of-court settlement in 2005.
- The company made a claim against an insurer in 2000. The amount was settled, and Web.com received $6 million.
- In June 2006, Web.com filed a lawsuit against Go Daddy, which alleges that Go Daddy's hosting and domain plans infringed on Web.com's patents.
- WebSource Media was acquired by the company on May 24, 2006 but by June 23, Web.com filed to rescind the acquisition when it learned that WebSource had engaged in "unfair and deceptive acts and business practices". Web.com was appointed to manage the business operations as an agent of the receiver when the court ordered that it be managed by a receiver.

== Website Pros ==
On June 26, 2007, Website Pros and Web.com announced that "the two companies have signed a definitive merger agreement". Website Pros, as the bigger of the two companies, acquired Web.com for a total of approximately ~$130 million, consisting of $25 million in cash and the rest in stock. Web.com representatives, including Jeff Stibel as the new president, will hold two of seven seats on Website Pro's board. The merger was completed on October1st, 2007. Prior to the Web.com merger, Website Pros had acquired: 1ShoppingCart.com, LEADS.com, NetObjects, Renovation Experts.com, and Submitawebsite.
