= LogicBoxes =

Software company

- Company type: Privately Held
- Industry: Software, Web Products, Consultancy
- Founded: 2003; 23 years ago
- Founder: Bhavin Turakhia
- Headquarters: Mumbai, India
- Key people: Shridhar Luthria, (Senior Vice President) Aditya Arya, (Associate Vice President)
- Services: Domain Reseller, Web Hosting Reseller, ICANN Accreditation Consulting
- Parent: Endurance International Group
- Website: LogicBoxes.com

LogicBoxes is a web product, and consulting company that specializes in providing private labeled, web presence, and communication applications to ICANN Registrars, large web hosts, domain resellers, ISPs, and telcos. In addition, it offers consulting and a SaaS platform that provides end-to-end business automation to its clients.

It was founded in 2003 and bought by Endurance International Group in 2013–14.

It provides ERP solutions that handle sales, marketing, finance, billing, and provisioning automation for domain registrars and Resellers.

The company is based in Mumbai, India, with its HQ located at Nesco IT Park.

== Company History ==
LogicBoxes was launched in 2003 as a separate business unit of Directi, to provide registrar software to Directi’s in-house domain registrar, ResellerClub, and other registrars. It was the first business automation solution for registrars and is currently the largest.

In 2013–14, Endurance International Group, a US-based provider of cloud-based solutions, completed the acquisition of the Web business of Directi. The acquisition included business-to-business brands ResellerClub, LogicBoxes and webhosting.info, and web presence brand BigRock.

== Industry Involvement ==
LogicBoxes is a frequent sponsor of ICANN Meetings and a strong supporter of the domain name community.

Bhavin Turakhia, ex-CEO of LogicBoxes served as the chairman of the Registrar Stakeholder Group (formerly the Registrar Constituency). He served as the chair for two successive terms and is the youngest elected chair to date.

== Products and Services ==
- ICANN Consultancy – LogicBoxes consults domain resellers, web hosts, ISPs and telcos on gaining ICANN accreditation. To date, they have accredited over 85 registrars. At HostingCon in August 2009, LogicBoxes unveiled Accreditation.com, a division that exclusively assists clients to achieve ICANN Accreditation.
- Domain Registry Services – LogicBoxes provides registrar software to ccTLDs registries to help them set up a local, or their own, registrar. They have worked with .mn, and .coop. LogicBoxes carried out the domain migration of 27,000 domains for the .co registry from the Universidad de Los Andes to the Registry’s own Registrar in 2010.
- Domains Exchange – Domains Exchange is the domain registration product from LogicBoxes. It acts as a gateway for Registrars to directly connect to popular gTLDs and multiple ccTLDs and register domains under their own registrar. The LogicBoxes platform currently supports 50+ TLDs.
- Web Hosting – LogicBoxes provides enterprise level hosting services to large providers. It launched its unlimited hosting plan in August 2009.
- Email Hosting – LogicBoxes also offers email hosting to its partners, it launched this new service in June 2009.
- Elite Reseller Program – laying a strategic focus on fast-growing Web Hosting Providers, launched in August 2016.

== Values ==
In September 2008, LogicBoxes, as part of the Directi group, was accused by HostExploit and Knujon of supporting malware and illegal online pharmacies. This was later proved false. Shortly thereafter, HostExploit and Knujon released a joint statement with Directi, which spoke of their common goal of combating abuse on the Internet.
