= Bluehost =

Web hosting company

- Type: Subsidiary
- Industry: Web hosting
- Founded: 2003; 23 years ago
- Founder: Matt Heaton
- Headquarters: Jacksonville, Florida, US
- Key people: Sachin Puri (Current CEO); Matt Heaton (Founder & CEO 2003–2011)
- Owner: Newfold Digital
- Number of employees: 501-1000
- Website: bluehost.com

Bluehost is a web hosting and domain registration company owned by Newfold Digital. The company sells shared, WordPress, VPS, dedicated, and WooCommerce hosting, as well as marketing services. It is listed as a recommended host on WordPress.org. Bluehost has been one of the 20 largest web hosts for the last decade, and was collectively hosting over two million domains in 2010.

== History ==
Matt Heaton conceived Bluehost in 1996, but launched two other web hosting services, 50megs.com and 0catch.com, before establishing Bluehost in 2003.

In 2009, Bluehost introduced CPU throttling, which is the process of reducing a user's CPU usage whenever that user pulls "too much" server resource at one time. At that time, Bluehost would freeze (or drastically reduce) client sites' CPU usage, effectively shutting down the website hosted on their server for several hours throughout the day. In March of that year, Bluehost appeared in a Newsweek article that condemned the hosting company for censoring the web pages of some of its customers, who were believed to be citizens of countries that the United States government had listed as rogue states.

In 2010, Bluehost was acquired by Endurance International Group. In February 2011, Bluehost, citing its terms-of-service ‘hate or violence’ clause, took down a religious website that it was hosting on its servers after receiving thousands of complaints when that website posted comments blaming gays and lesbians for an earthquake in New Zealand. In June 2011, company founder Matt Heaton announced on his blog that he was stepping down as CEO to focus on the company hosting platform's design and technical structure, while COO Dan Handy took over as CEO.

In 2013, Bluehost introduced VPS and dedicated server hosting. In January 2015, Endurance International Group appointed Mike Olson as CEO of Bluehost, while Dan Handy moved to enterprise-wide mobile development for small businesses. In January 2017, the company announced that it would lay off 440 Bluehost employees in Utah, in an effort to consolidate its business to improve customer support.

In 2021, the parent company Endurance International Group, merged with Web.com forming a new company, Newfold Digital, hence Bluehost became a subsidiary of Newfold Digital. In July 2023, Bluehost launched WonderSuite product which offers an AI-powered site-building guide.

During Oracle’s Q2 2025 earnings call on March 10, 2025, Chairman Larry Ellison announced that Newfold Digital, the parent company of Bluehost and HostGator, is transitioning to Oracle Cloud alongside several other companies to enhance security and performance. In May of 2025, Bluehost launched its VPS and Dedicated servers on Oracle Cloud.

== Security breaches ==
In March 2015, Bluehost was hacked by the Syrian Electronic Army. Also hacked were Justhost, Hostgator, Hostmonster and Fastdomain, all owned by Endurance International Group. SEA claimed that these services were hosting terrorist websites. Syrian Electronic Army posted screenshots of the attack on Twitter.

In January 2019, the magazine WebsitePlanet uncovered client-side vulnerability in some of the largest hosting companies in the world: Bluehost, DreamHost, HostGator, iPage and OVH. The company patched the flaw within 48 hours.
