= Joel Kocher =

American businessman

- Born: 1956 (age 69–70); Florida, U.S.
- Title: Co-founder of Humann
- Term: (2009–present)
- Spouse: AnnMarie Kocher

Joel Kocher is an American businessman and entrepreneur. He is best known for his leadership at Dell during its rise into the Fortune 500, his tenure as president of Power Computing, and his role in transforming MicronPC into a leading internet infrastructure company. Later in his career, Kocher co-founded Humann, a cardiovascular health company based on nitric oxide science, where he continues to serve as a business leader and advocate for science-based supplements.

Fred Goldberg said that “next to Michael Dell, Joel's leadership was responsible more than anyone else's for Dell's growth in those early years. Joel was an important part of the brand.”

== Early life and education ==
Kocher grew up in Florida and earned a B.S. in marketing from the University of Florida. He later completed executive programs at Stanford Business School and the Wharton School of Business.

Kocher played basketball in college and maintained a passion for endurance sports. His early interest in leadership and adventure was shaped by reading The Endurance, the account of Sir Ernest Shackleton's Antarctic expedition, which later inspired Kocher to pursue open-water sailing and, eventually, his own Antarctic expedition.

== Career ==
=== Dell (1980s–1996) ===
Kocher joined Dell in the late 1980s, when the company had annual revenues of less than $100 million. Over the next seven years, Dell's revenues grew by more than 4,000%, propelling the company into the Fortune 500 within five years.

During his tenure, Kocher was promoted four times, ultimately serving as president of Worldwide Sales, Marketing, and Support. He was instrumental in developing Dell's direct-to-customer model, building out commercial and government contracts, and establishing Dell's global marketing and customer support infrastructure.

Business press in the 1990s, including BusinessWeek, Wall Street Journal, and Fortune, frequently cited Kocher as a key figure behind Dell's commercial success during this period.

Kocher served on Vice President Al Gore’s government technology task force, which was charged with re-architecting the federal IT procurement process to improve efficiency.

=== Power Computing (1996–1997) ===
In 1996, Kocher became president of Power Computing, the first licensed Macintosh clone manufacturer. Power Computing was one of the fastest-growing technology companies of the era, employing a direct-sales model similar to Dell's. Under Kocher's leadership, the company filed an S-1 to go public in May 1997. Apple acquired the company after stalling its IPO plans shortly after Steve Jobs returned as its CEO.

Power Computing played a central role in Apple's short-lived licensing experiment, which allowed third-party companies to manufacture Macintosh-compatible systems. When Apple declined to renew Power's licensing agreement, Kocher resigned after the board chose not to pursue legal action against Apple.

Coverage in the Los Angeles Times, Wall Street Journal, and later books on Apple's history described the episode as a pivotal moment in Apple's turnaround strategy.

=== MicronPC / Interland / Web.com (1998–early 2000s) ===
Kocher joined MicronPC in January 1998 as president and was later promoted to chairman and CEO. When majority owner Micron Technology decided to exit the PC market, Kocher redirected the company toward internet infrastructure and services.

He sold Micron's PC divisions and began consolidating the emerging web-hosting industry, starting with public company Interland. Through a series of acquisitions, the company became the world's largest web-hosting provider by number of websites hosted. In 2004, the company was ranked the 12th fastest-growing technology company in the Americas on Deloitte's Fast 100 list.

This strategic pivot placed the company at the forefront of early cloud and hosting services, laying groundwork for later developments in internet infrastructure.

=== Humann (2009–present) ===
Humann's origins trace back to Nobel Laureate Dr. Ferid Murad, awarded the Nobel Prize in Medicine in 1998. Years later, Dr. Murad joined The University of Texas Health Science Center to lead a research discovery program. Discoveries from that program, alongside contributions from UT researchers, led to Humann's founding in 2009 to bring this science to the public in 2010. Dr. Murad joined Humann's Science team in 2020 and served until his passing in 2023.

Dr. John Ivy, a leading exercise physiologist and chair emeritus at the University of Texas, has served as a lead scientist with the company since 2012.

Humann has invested millions of dollars into science, conducting at least eight peer-reviewed clinical trials. A product of it, SuperBeets, became the #1 cardiologist-, pharmacist-, and doctor-recommended beet brand for cardiovascular health support, according to surveys by IQVIA ProVoice Surveys.

Under Kocher's leadership, Humann has expanded distribution into more than 30,000 retail locations, including Sam’s Club, CVS, Walgreens, Walmart, and Target.

Awards and recognition

- Nutrition Business Journal – Nutrition Science Award (2016)
- Inc. 5000 honoree, Ten consecutive years (2015–2024)
- Ernst & Young Entrepreneur of the Year, South Central Region Winner (2022)
- Judge, Ernst & Young Entrepreneur of the Year South Central Region (3 years)
- Deloitte Fast 100 – ranked 12th fastest technology growth company in the Americas (2004, as Interland)

Personal life

Kocher lives in Austin, Texas, with his wife, AnnMarie. Together, they were a founding family of Trinity Episcopal School in Austin. He has also served as a mentor in the Big Brothers Big Sisters program.

Beyond his career in business, Kocher is a lifelong athlete and adventurer. He competed in mountain running, played college basketball, and remains active as a long-distance paddle boarder and ocean paddle surfer. His passion for open-water sailing led him to pursue an Antarctic expedition, inspired by the story of Sir Ernest Shackleton.
