= Constant Contact =

Online marketing company

Constant Contact, Inc.
- Type: Private
- Industry: Online marketing
- Founded: 1995; 31 years ago, in Massachusetts, U.S. (as Roving Software)
- Headquarters: Waltham, Massachusetts, U.S.
- Revenue: ▲US$331.7 million (2014)
- Operating income: ▲US$19.8 million (2014)
- Net income: ▲US$14.3 million (2014)
- Owner: Clearlake Capital; Siris Capital Group
- Number of employees: 1,235
- Website: www.constantcontact.com
- Footnotes; As of January 2015.

Constant Contact, Inc. is an online marketing company, headquartered in Waltham, Massachusetts, with additional offices in Boston, Massachusetts; Loveland, Colorado; Gainesville, Florida; Los Angeles, California; Brisbane, Australia; Waterloo, Canada; and, London, England.

The company was founded in 1995 by Randy Parker and was later sold to Endurance International in 2015. As of 2021 it had been acquired by ClearLake Investments.

== History ==
The company was founded as Roving Software in 1995, taking its present name in 2004.

In May 2008, Constant Contact's first acquisition was e2M Systems, an Event Management System for workshops, seminars and conferences of all sizes.

In May 2010, Constant Contact acquired NutshellMail, a free tool that lets users monitor their social media accounts from their email. As reported by Mashable, Constant Contact recently released other social media features, such as Social Stats, which lets users see how often their emails or events have been shared on social media platforms.

On February 16, 2011, Constant Contact acquired social CRM start-up Bantam Live.

In 2012, Constant Contact acquired two companies. On January 19, they announced the acquisition of CardStar, a mobile loyalty application. On June 13, they also acquired digital storefront provider SinglePlatform for approximately $65 million.

In April 2014, Constant Contact announced the launch of Toolkit, an all-in-one online marketing platform that integrates multi-channel marketing options - including email, social, mobile, and Web – to drive customer campaigns of all types. The toolkit offers 15 different campaign types along with real-time reporting metrics. 2014 also saw the launch of Constant Contact's Small Business Innovation Program, an accelerator designed to help entrepreneurs and startups create products and services for small businesses. The program is hosted in the company's 30,000 square foot InnoLoft office space, located in the Waltham, MA headquarters.

In November 2015, Constant Contact was acquired for $1.1 billion by Endurance International.

In February 2021, Clearlake Capital (who acquired Endurance International) announced an investment of $400 million as a joint venture with Siris Capital, and the spin-out of Constant Contact as a standalone business

In August 2021, Constant Contact acquired the marketing automation and CRM system SharpSpring.

In June 2025, Constant Contact acquired Moosend, an email marketing and automation platform based in Athens, Greece, from Sitecore. The terms of the transaction were not disclosed. Moosend continues to operate its platform and also powers Sitecore’s Send solution for existing and new customers.

== Services ==
- Email service provider

== Self-promotion ==
In 2007, the company was criticized by blogger Darren Barefoot on the grounds that its current and former employees responded deceptively to negative reviews of its products, services, and business practices. They posted positive comments about the company while concealing their affiliation with Constant Contact.

The company spokesperson Kevin Mullins reportedly acknowledged that Constant Contact employees had posted the comments on Barefoot's site, but said "They acted outside our corporate policy. They were disciplined, absolutely. And obviously, we educated them about the proper way to blog and to fully disclose who you are. We believe in being honest and up front about who you are."
