= Register.com =

American domain name registrar

- Website type: Subsidiary of Web.com
- Founded: 1994; 32 years ago
- Headquarters: Jacksonville, FL, US
- Key people: Larry Kutscher, CEO and President
- Industry: Domain name registrar
- Products: Web services
- Parent: Web.com
- Website: www.register.com

Register.com is an American domain name registrar founded in 1994.

== History ==
The company was founded in 1994 as Forman Interactive Corp by brothers Peter and Richard Forman and their brother-in-law, Dan B. Levine as a provider of website creation software. In 1999, the company officially changed its name to Register.com.

On April 21, 1999, ICANN announced Register.com was one of the first five testbed registrars for the competitive Shared Registry System. On June 7, the company began operations under this name as a paid registrar in the .com, .net, and .org domains and soon became the first of the five testbed registrars to come online. It was initially selling 3,000 to 4,000 domain names per day.

In March 2000, at the peak of the dot-com bubble, the company became a public company via an initial public offering. The stock price peaked at $116 per share; 1 year later the stock traded at $5 per share.

In September 2000, the company acquired Afternic.com for $48.6 million in cash and stock.

In 2003, Richard D. Forman resigned from his positions as president and chief executive officer.

In November 2005, Register.com was acquired by Vector Capital for $200 million.

In 2005, it became the first online services company to receive the J.D. Power Call Center Certification. Register.com received this recognition again in 2006, 2007, 2008 and 2009.

Vector Capital brought in David Moore, a principal at the private equity firm Sonostar, as an interim CEO.

In November 2006, Larry Kutscher joined Register.com as chief executive officer. Kutscher came to Register.com from Dun & Bradstreet where he served as Senior Vice President and general manager of the Small Business Group.

In June 2010, Web.com acquired the company for $135 million. In June 2018, Web.com was acquired by Siris Capital Group. In February 2021, Siris and Clearlake Capital Group merged Web.com with Clearlake's Endurance International Group to form a new company, Newfold Digital. As a result of this merger, Register.com became one of the brands under the Newfold Digital portfolio.

In June 2025, Register.com announced that it would merge with Network Solutions. As part of the integration, the Register.com brand is being consolidated into Network Solutions, with customer accounts scheduled to be migrated to the Network Solutions platform.

== Controversies and consumer issues ==
On April 1, 2009, Register.com suffered a major DDoS attack, downing thousands of websites. Customers were not able to access the website or receive email for 3 days.

In January 2010, the Chinese search engine Baidu sued Register.com for gross negligence after an employee allegedly allowed third party access to Baidu's account despite them failing to pass basic security verification, allowing for a Domain hijacking of the Baidu website by the Iranian Cyber Army.

== See also ==
- Register.com v. Verio
