= Emmit McHenry =

American entrepreneur

Emmit McHenry (born July 12, 1943) is an American entrepreneur, engineer, and technology pioneer known for his contributions to the internet. He founded Network Solutions, Inc. in 1979, which became the first company to register domain names, playing a crucial role in the development of the domain name system (DNS), and the TCP/IP Internet Protocol, making the internet more stable and user-friendly.

== Early life and education ==
Emmit McHenry was born in Forrest City, Arkansas, and raised in Tulsa, Oklahoma, in the historic Greenwood District, which was widely known as "Black Wall Street", a hub of Black entrepreneurship before the 1921 Tulsa Race Massacre. McHenry attended Carver Middle School, and Booker T. Washington High School. He went on to earn a Bachelor of Science in communications from the University of Denver in 1966 and later completed a Master's Degree in Communications and Industrial Engineering and completed all but the dissertation for the Ph.D program Northwestern University in 1975.

== Military career ==
2nd Lieutenant McHenry served in the United States Marine Corps, where he worked in the Command, Control, Communications, and Computers (C4) systems division. His service in the Marines helped foster his vision for the future of communications. The Marine Corps enhanced his leadership skills and technology expertise. In recognition of his contributions to military technology, McHenry was honored by the Marine Corps as a Guest of Honor at the Iwo Jima Monument.

== Career ==
McHenry began his career at IBM as a systems engineer. Following his Marine Corps service, he was an agent of change at several corporations, including Connecticut General Insurance, Union Mutual Insurance, and Allstate Insurance, where he rose to executive positions, including Regional Vice President of Allstate's Largest Region. In 1979 he co-founded Network Solutions, Inc., alongside Gary Desler, Ty Grigsby, and Ed Peters. The company revolutionized the internet by becoming the first entity authorized by the National Science Foundation to oversee the registration of domain names. This was a key moment in the commercialization of the internet, making it easier for people to navigate using human-readable domain names instead of complex IP addresses. Network Solutions was acquired by Verisign in 1997 for over $21 billion.

McHenry's work on the domain name system (DNS) was instrumental in the expansion of the Internet. The DNS system allows users to navigate websites through user-friendly domain names rather than numeric IP addresses, dramatically simplifying the internet experience. His contributions helped lay the foundation for the web’s growth and accessibility.

Following his success with Network Solutions, McHenry launched other business ventures, including Archura and Defense Manufacturing, where he was chairman and CEO. These companies focus on telecommunications and defense technologies. McHenry founded NetCom Solutions International with operations in Africa, Asia, and Europe, focusing on communications system build-out.

== Teaching ==
In addition to his entrepreneurial endeavors, McHenry has contributed to academia as an associate dean at Northwestern University. His teaching and mentorship have been part of his professional life, and he remains committed to helping young professionals develop their leadership and technical skills.

== Community work ==
McHenry is an advocate for increasing diversity and inclusion in the tech industry. He supports mentoring programs helping underrepresented groups succeed in technology and entrepreneurship. His philanthropic work includes initiatives to bridge the digital divide and promote access to technology and education in underserved communities.

== Recognition ==
He received an honorary doctorate from Shaw University and recognition from the U.S. Marine Corps for his work in military technology. He is also recognized for his work in developing the internet.
