= CuteFTP =

Series of File Transfer Protocol applications

- Developer: GlobalSCAPE
- Stable release: 9.4.0 (Windows) April 6, 2026; 5 months ago / 3.1.2 (Mac) January 1, 2014; 12 years ago
- Operating system: Windows & Mac OS X
- Type: FTP client: Home & Pro
- License: Proprietary
- Website: www.globalscape.com/cuteftp

CuteFTP is a series of File Transfer Protocol (FTP) client applications distributed and supported since 1996 by GlobalSCAPE, who later bought the rights to the software. Both a Windows-based or Mac-based interface were made for both home and professional use.

CuteFTP is used to transfer files between computers and FTP servers to publish web pages, download digital images, music, multi-media files and software, and transfer files of any size or type between home and office. Since 1999, CuteFTP Pro and CuteFTP Mac Pro have also been available alongside CuteFTP Home with free trial periods.

It was originally developed by Alex Kunadze, a Russian programmer.
