= CuteMX =

CuteMX was an early P2P file sharing program that emerged prior to Napster's demise. Like services such as Napster and Scour, CuteMX used a centrally located server for connecting users of the service and their shared files. CuteMX was developed by GlobalSCAPE in 2000 but unlike Napster, Globalscape decided to pull the service due to intense litigation around Napster, preferring to honor the copyright complaints by the music industry artists and their associates, and reconsider introducing CuteMX after the issues were decided and clarified in the courts, even though CuteMX had actually gained a fairly sizable dedicated user base. GlobalSCAPE announced in July 2000 that they had shut down CuteMX temporarily due to Napster's ongoing court battles. The last version of the CuteMX client (2.5) was released in August 2000 with content filtering technology meant to prevent trading of illegal files and to appease the movie and music recording industries. In spite of the positive results for Napster from their own litigation, no further versions of the CuteMX program were released.

The "MX" in the CuteMX name stood for "Media eXchange" and "Music eXchange"

== Technology ==
The CuteMX client had an integrated version of Windows Media Player. Additional client features included DCC (direct client-to-client) transfer for trusted users and private chat and instant messaging functionality.
