= Endurance International Group =

American information technology services company

Newfold Digital, Inc.
- Formerly: BizLand (1997-2002); Endurance International Group, Inc. (2002-2021)
- Type: Private
- Traded as: Nasdaq: EIGI (2013-2021)
- Industry: Internet hosting services
- Predecessor: BizLand
- Founded: 1997; 29 years ago
- Founders: Hari Ravichandran; Ravi Agarwal
- Headquarters: Jacksonville, Florida, US
- Number of locations: Worldwide
- Key people: Sharon Rowlands (CEO); Christina Clohecy (CFO) and (COO)
- Services: Web hosting, domain registration, SEO, email marketing
- Owner: Clearlake Capital; Siris Capital Group
- Number of employees: Over 2,500 (2016)
- Divisions: Network Solutions Group; Bluehost Group
- Website: newfold.com

Newfold Digital, Inc., previously named BizLand and Endurance International Group, Inc. (EIG), is an American information technology services company that provides web hosting. The company was founded in 1997 and is headquartered in Burlington, Massachusetts. It is one of the largest web hosting providers, with a global market share of 3.5 percent according to W3Techs. The company has grown its hosting and related business through numerous acquisitions. In 2021, Clearlake Capital acquired EIG and merged its web presence division with Web.com, which had been owned by Siris Capital Group since 2018. The combined company, Newfold Digital, is a joint venture between Clearlake and Siris.

== History ==
Endurance International Group logo

The company was named BizLand until 2002.

In 2011, Warburg Pincus and Goldman Sachs Alternatives bought Endurance from Accel-KKR for about $975 million. In September 2013, the company announced plans to raise $400 million in an initial public offering (IPO) and to list on the Nasdaq under the ticker symbol EIGI. It went public in October 2013, selling shares at $12 each and raising $252 million, less than its $400 million target.

The company's growth was similar to that of the networking company Verio in the 1990s, which used free cash flow and access to capital markets to acquire other businesses. Its approach was to roll up small internet service providers (ISPs) into one large provider to achieve economies of scale. Endurance acquired these hosting companies both domestically and internationally.

In 2014, EIG bought four Directi-owned companies – BigRock, LogicBoxes, ResellerClub, and Webhosting.info – for $160 million.

In March 2015, the company acquired a 40 percent stake in AppMachine, a technology startup based in the Netherlands. In August 2015, EIG announced that it would acquire Site5 and Verio Web Hosting from NTT. The acquisitions were estimated to add more than 86,000 subscribers. In November 2015, the company acquired Constant Contact and, days later, laid off 15 percent of its workforce. That same month, EIG acquired the assets of Ecommerce, LLC for $28 million.

In June 2018, EIG agreed to pay an $8 million penalty to settle Securities and Exchange Commission (SEC) charges that it had overstated its subscriber numbers. In August 2018, former CEO Hari Ravichandran and former CFO Waruna Ellawala settled for related charges in the amounts of $1.38 million and $34,000, respectively.

Endurance acquired Ecomdash in October 2019 for $9.6 million in cash and placed it under the Constant Contact group.

In November 2020, Clearlake Capital Group announced that it would acquire EIG for about $3 billion. Clearlake spun off the EIG web presence division, which included Domain.com, Bluehost, and HostGator and merged it with Web.com in 2021 to form Newfold Digital. Clearlake also spun off EIG's Constant Contact division as a separate joint venture between Clearlake and Siris.

In November 2022, Newfold Digital agreed to purchase Markmonitor, a provider of domain management services, from Clarivate. Markmonitor provides brand protection, anti-piracy, and domain-name registration to technology companies and other businesses.

In June 2025, Newfold Digital merged the Web.com brand into Network Solutions, redirecting Web.com visitors to the Network Solutions login page. In a reorganization, the company split its operations into two divisions: the Network Solutions Group, led by Christina Clohecy, which included Network Solutions, Register.com, Domain.com, MarkMonitor, and Crazy Domains; and the Bluehost Group, led by Sachin Puri, which included the company's hosting brands.

== Subsidiary brands ==
The company owns and operates numerous hosting businesses, with shared support information and support agents. Subsidiaries and brands include:

- Bluehost
- CrazyDomains
- Domain.com
- FastDomain
- Homestead
- HostGator
- iPage
- LogicBoxes
- MarkMonitor (November 2022 - 2025)
- Network Solutions
- Register.com
- ResellerClub
- Site5
- Typepad
- Verio (webhosting only)
- Vodien
- Web.com
- Yoast SEO
