= Rae Technology =

Rae Technology was a software company founded as a spin-off from Apple in 1992. Rae Technology was best known for its Personal Information Manager Rae Assist and for being the predecessor of NetObjects After transferring new developed technology for web site design to NetObjects in 1995, Rae Technology had no further public recognition.

== Roots in Apple Computer ==
The roots of Rae Technology reach back to the 80s at Apple. Samir Arora, a software engineer from India, was involved in early research in navigation applications and so-called hypermedia. Years before the Internet took off and web browser emerged, developers and executives at Apple had the idea that fast and flexible access to linked data would be crucial to future computing. The famous "Knowledge Navigator" video from 1987 gives an impression of the visions at Apple labs in this time. Samir Arora worked in the office of John Sculley at the time and was involved in creating the video.

Samir Arora had been part of the original 4th Dimension engineering team at Apple and ran the applications tools group responsible for 4D and Hypercard. To manage mobile and online data access and navigation, a group of software developers, including Dave Dell'Aquila, Sal Arora, Raj Narayan and Jeet Kaul, and led by Samir Arora, created an application framework called SOLO (Structure of Linked Objects).

In technical terms, SOLO was a proprietary programming language to develop sets of application programming interfaces (APIs).

== Rae Technology and Rae Assist ==
With new applications based on SOLO on the rise, Samir Arora started Rae Technology as a spin-off from Apple. Headquarters were located on the Apple campus and the board consisted of high-ranked Apple executives.

The company was run by Samir Arora as chief executive officer and President, David Kleinberg as Vice President Sales and Marketing, Dave Dell'Aquila as Vice President Products, and Dianna Mullins as Vice President Operations.

In 1993, Rae Technology introduced its Rae Assist, one of the first Personal Information Managers (PIMs). Rae Assist would let the user organize and access personal contacts, dates, company profiles, scheduling, and linking these entries. Between 1993 and 1995 Rae Assist was published in three versions for the Mac, 1.0, 1.5 and 2.0.

== Professional services ==
Beyond producing software, Rae Technology worked on corporate database projects for Chevron and Wells Fargo.

An online banking project at Wells Fargo gave the Rae team insight in how the Web could work for companies in the future world of Internet and browsers. The SOLO architecture seemed to be perfectly suited and to be flexible enough to address the need of building something yet new: web sites. The filing of fundamental patents for web site design was in preparation.

== From Rae to NetObjects ==
There are no publicly available balance sheets from Rae Technology but the highly competitive and rather small PIM market should not have generated a lot of income. A full license of that program was sold for $199, upgrades for $29.

With patents for web site design software pending, the efforts and technology for this new kind of software were transferred to a new company. NetObjects was founded in 1995 and Rae Technology was its first investor with $1.5 million.

The new company had the same core team that led Rae: Samir Arora, his brother Sal Arora, and David Kleinberg. Clement Mok from Studio Archetype, who had already been involved with the Wells Fargo project, was added as a designer.

At the conclusion of the transaction, Rae Technology became a Venture Capital LLC but ceased to attract any further public attention though it exists as a company until today.
