= Homestead Technologies =

American software company

Homestead Technologies Inc.
- Type: Subsidiary
- Industry: Web services
- Founded: October 1997; 28 years ago Menlo Park, California, U.S.
- Founders: Justin S. Kitch; Thai Bui; David Wu
- Headquarters: Palo Alto, CA, U.S.,
- Key people: Justin S. Kitch (Chairman and CEO)
- Services: Web hosting service E-commerce services Online advertising
- Revenue: US$6.67 million
- Number of employees: 116 (2015)
- Parent: Intuit Inc. (2007-2012); EIG (2012-present)
- Website: www.homestead.com

Homestead Technologies Inc. is a web hosting company based in Burlington, Massachusetts.

== Scope ==
Homestead offers its members WYSIWIG tools to build and publish their own websites.

Since its founding as a free service provider, Homestead has expanded the scope of its services to include online marketing, paid search ads, SEO tools, and e-commerce services.

Homestead is geared mostly towards small business owners, non-profit administrators, retailers, and hobbyists, unlike competitors such as Angelfire and Yahoo! GeoCities, who target more casual users.

== History ==
In October 1997, Justin S. Kitch and Thai Bui founded Homestead, in Menlo Park, California. The company quickly became popular due to its accessibility and ease of use. Its proprietary drag-and-drop SiteBuilder platform enabled users with no prior knowledge of coding or web programming to create fully functioning websites for personal, educational, or business use.

In June 1998, the company launched Homestead.com, which enabled Internet users to build a website, with a focus on small businesses, e-commerce, and their related services, such as consulting, listings, and online business directories.

By October 1999 member registrations reached two million.

In October 2003, Homestead Technologies launched PhotoSite, a photo sharing and web hosting service tailored to amateur digital photography.

In March 2005, PhotoSite was sold to United Online.

In December 2007, Homestead was acquired by financial and tax preparation software giant Intuit for US$170 million to bolster its web hosting offerings.

On August 16, 2012, Intuit announced that Homestead would be purchased by web hosting company Endurance International Group of Burlington, Massachusetts.

== See also ==
- Tripod (web hosting)
- WordPress
