= WikiCalc =

Online spreadsheet editor

wikiCalc
- Developer: Dan Bricklin
- Stable release: 1.0 / January 25, 2007; 19 years ago
- Operating system: Cross-platform
- Type: Wiki / Online Spreadsheet
- License: GNU General Public License
- Website: www.softwaregarden.com/products/wikicalc/

wikiCalc is a web application, created by Dan Bricklin, that allows for the creation and editing of spreadsheets through a wiki-style user-editable interface. It is currently released as version 1.0 for use on Windows, Mac, Linux/Unix, and other platforms that can run the Perl language.

The product was envisioned in 2005 by Bricklin, who 27 years earlier created VisiCalc, the first commercial spreadsheet program for the personal computer. Version Alpha 0.1 was released for alpha testing in November 2005. Version 1.0 was released on January 25, 2007. wikiCalc is written in the Perl programming language.

wikiCalc is released under the GNU General Public License, and is thus free software.

On June 8, 2006, Dan Bricklin and Socialtext announced a partnership which encompasses an exclusive distribution deal as well as a pledge for co-development. The Socialtext version of the software is called SocialCalc.

== See also ==
- List of online spreadsheets
