= MPC Corporation =

American computer hardware company

- Type: Public; Spin-off
- Industry: Computer hardware
- Founded: 1995 (as Micron Technology subsidiary Micron Electronics, Inc.); 2001 as a spin-off
- Founder: Michael Coxhead
- Defunct: December 31, 2008
- Fate: Bankruptcy; assets abandoned
- Headquarters: Nampa, Idaho, U.S.
- Key people: John Yeros (Chairman & CEO)
- Products: Desktops; Servers; Notebooks
- Revenue: $365 million (as of 2007)
- Number of employees: 680 (as of 2007)
- Website: www.mpccorp.com at the Wayback Machine (archive index)

MPC Corporation was a computer-hardware company based in Nampa, Idaho, United States. It was best known as a provider of desktops, notebooks, servers and services to customers in the federal, state and local government, education, small and medium business, and consumer markets. Before June 2001, MPC Corporation was known as Micron Electronics Inc., a spin-off of Boise-based semiconductor manufacturer Micron Technology.

MPC filed for Chapter 11 bankruptcy on November 7, 2008, three days after the company's common stock was removed from public listing on the NYSE Alternext U.S. exchange (formerly the American Stock Exchange). On December 31, 2008, MPC notified the Idaho Department of Labor that its efforts to reorganize had failed and the company would cease operations.

== History ==
MPC Computers (originally named Micron Electronics Inc.) was founded privately in Nampa, Idaho in 1995 through a merger of ZEOS International, Micron Computer, and Micron Custom Manufacturing. From 1995 to 2001, Micron Electronics Inc. sold consumer and business computers under the names Micron, MicronPC, and MicronPC.com. The acquisition of HostPro (Web.com) in 1999 under CEO Joel Kocher brought the firm into the web hosting space. In June 2001, in an all-stock deal, Gores Technology Group acquired the MicronPC business from Micron Technology. In December 2002, the company changed its name from MicronPC to MPC Computers.

In July 2005, application acceleration provider HyperSpace Communications Inc. merged with MPC Computers in a stock-swap deal. Because HyperSpace became a public company in 2004, MPC Computers was able to avoid the rigorous process of becoming a public company. MPC Corporation was listed on the NYSE Alternext US LLC exchange (formerly the American Stock and Options Exchange) as ticker symbol MPZ until being delisted. In January 2007, HyperSpace Communications Inc. changed its name to MPC Corporation. In September 2007, MPC Corporation announced that it had signed an agreement to acquire Gateway, Inc.'s Professional Services Unit business line for approximately $90 million.

=== Stock delisting ===
In early May 2008, the AMEX notified MPC that it was not in compliance with AMEX regulations because the company's stockholder equity had fallen below $2 million and that MPC had sustained losses from continuing operations or net losses in two of its three most recent fiscal years. MPC responded to that notice by filing a plan to achieve compliance which AMEX accepted June 27, 2008, giving MPC until Nov. 9, 2009 to bring itself back to viability under AMEX rules. However, in October 2008 the exchange (which changed its name to NYSE Alternext at the beginning of that month) notified MPC that MPC was not making progress consistent with its submitted plan and said that the plan no longer demonstrated the company's ability to regain compliance with exchange regulations. Exchange officials also concluded that MPC was not compliant with other standards related to the company's overall financial condition and ability to continue operations, its low stock share price and the decline of its market capitalization.

=== Bankruptcy ===
In early November 2008, MPC filed a petition for Chapter 11 bankruptcy protection in the United States Bankruptcy Court for the District of Delaware. In a press release announcing the filing, CEO John Yeros said issues surrounding the integration of the former Gateway unit along with problems with their "manufacturing partner" contributed to extensive losses. When it gave its shutdown notice to the Idaho Department of Labor, MPC noted that a substantial portion of its sales force resigned without notice between Dec. 4 and Dec. 12, which it said made it impossible to continue viable business operations. It also said that efforts to reorganize under Chapter 11 were unsuccessful and announced it would lay off 147 employees immediately, keeping the remaining 51 employees only to wind down operations. It provided no advance notice of the layoff because "the decision to cease all business operations and liquidate the company was not reached until just prior to notice" and "advance notice of a possible layoff would have precluded its ability to obtain financing to allow the company to avoid a shutdown."

== Bowl sponsorship ==
From 1998 through 2000, MicronPC sponsored the MicronPC Bowl, a post-season NCAA Division I college football bowl game played at Pro Player Stadium in Miami, Florida. In 1999, the bowl was renamed the MicronPC.com Bowl to emphasize the company's internet presence.

From 2004 to 2006, MPC Computers sponsored the MPC Computers Bowl, a post-season NCAA Division I college football bowl game played annually at Bronco Stadium on the campus of Boise State University. Before and after the sponsorship of MPC Computers, this bowl game was known as the Humanitarian Bowl; its name was changed to the Famous Idaho Potato Bowl in 2011.

Former parent company Micron Technology also sponsored the Humanitarian Bowl (at the time named the Crucial.com Humanitarian Bowl) from 1999 through 2002.
