= Jim Rutt =

American businessman (1953–2026)

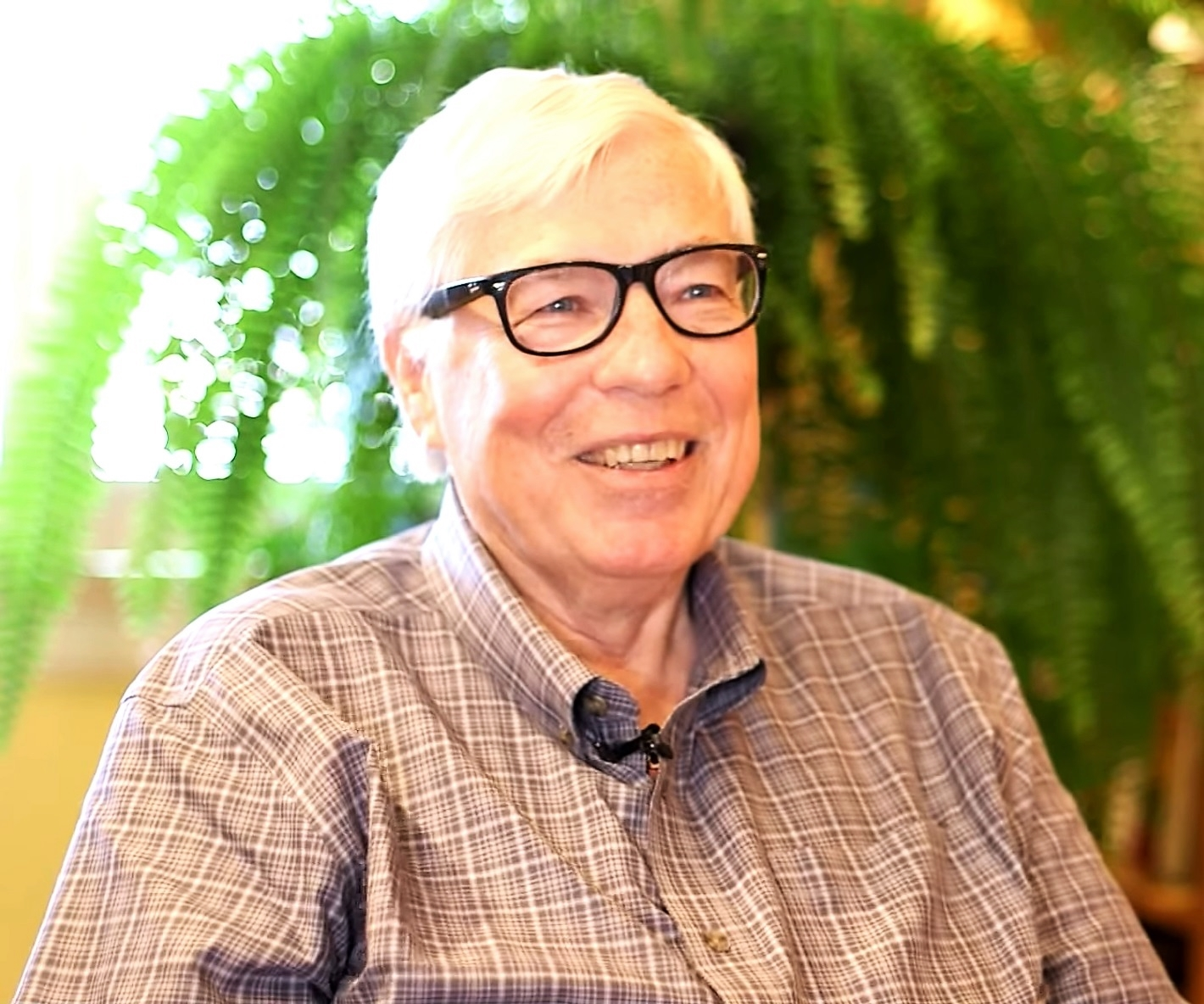
- Rutt in 2021
- Born: James Patrick Rutt; December 11, 1953
- Died: May 27, 2026 (aged 72)
- Education: Massachusetts Institute of Technology
- Occupation: Businessman
- Known for: Network Solutions, Santa Fe Institute, snail mail

James Patrick Rutt (December 11, 1953 – May 27, 2026) was an American businessman who was the CEO of Network Solutions, and the chairman of the Santa Fe Institute.

== Early life ==
Rutt was born on December 11, 1953. In 1975, he received a bachelor's degree in management from the Massachusetts Institute of Technology. He later ran technology operations for Thomson Corporation.

== Business career ==
Rutt was the CEO of Network Solutions, an American technology and Internet company. He was hired in 1999 during the dot-com boom, and negotiated the company's $15 billion acquisition by Verisign, where it continued operating as an independent subsidiary. In March 2001, after the acquisition, he subsequently stepped down from his position as a Verisign executive. After retiring, New Mexico governor Bill Richardson appointed Rutt to serve on the State Investment Council. In 2014, Rutt co-founded a makerspace in Staunton, Virginia with software engineer Dan Funk.

== Activities ==
In 1981, Rutt was the first to use the term "snail mail" to describe conventional mail services, in contrast with email. Rutt was a trustee of the Santa Fe Institute, a multi-disciplinary research organization, and was its chairman before retiring in 2012. He did research into the scientific study of consciousness and artificial general intelligence.

He hosted a podcast called The Jim Rutt Show.

== Death ==
Rutt died on May 27, 2026, at the age of 72.
