= MarkMonitor =

American software company

MarkMonitor, Inc.
- Type: Subsidiary
- Founded: 1999; 27 years ago
- Founder: Faisal Shah; Ed Priddy; James Hepworth
- Headquarters: Boise, Idaho, USA
- Area served: Worldwide
- Products: Domain management
- Number of employees: 520 (2017)
- Parent: Independent; (1999–2012); Thomson Reuters; (2012–16); Clarivate Analytics; (2016–22); Newfold Digital; (2022–2025); Com Laude; (2026–present)
- Website: www.markmonitor.com

MarkMonitor, Inc. (styling as Markmonitor) is an American software company founded in 1999 and headquartered in Boise, Idaho. It develops software intended to protect corporate brands from Internet counterfeiting, fraud, piracy, and cybersquatting. .

Acquired in November 2022 by Newfold Digital, it was later announced that the firm would be sold to Com Laude, a company owned by PX3 Partners. On January 12, 2026, it was reported that Com Laude completed its acquisition of MarkMonitor.

== History ==
Founded in 1999 in Boise, Idaho, MarkMonitor was initially a service provider for the protection of corporate trademarks on the Internet. Then, within two years, it gained ICANN accreditation status for domain registration and acquired a domain management business called AllDomains.

In October 2010, MarkMonitor acquired an anti-piracy company (DtecNet) and was itself purchased by Thomson Reuters' Intellectual Property & Science business in July 2012. In 2016, it was part of the sale of Reuters' IP division to two venture capital firms, under the new parent company Clarivate Analytics.

In 2022, Clarivate announced that its subsidiary had been sold to Newfold Digital, a web and commerce technology provider backed by the Clearlake and Siris groups. After announcing it would buy MarkMonitor for an undisclosed sum, domain registrar Com Laude completed the transaction in January 2026.

== Research ==
According to the MarkMonitor web site, it has been publishing a report called the Brandjacking Index since 2007, to assess how Internet threats affect corresponding brands. The company's annual report says that cybersquatting increased 18 percent in 2008 and "phishing attacks" rose 36 percent in the first quarter of 2009.

In 2010, the company estimated that $200 billion in revenues is lost annually as a result of worldwide counterfeiting and piracy on the Internet. The 2011 report said the company had identified 23,000 listings "for clones, suspected counterfeits, or gray market" versions of tablet computers by 8,000 sellers. A 2011 opinion piece in Techdirt criticized the research methodology of MarkMonitor's report.

== Products and services ==
According to MarkMonitor, it develops and markets brand protection software and services to combat counterfeiting, piracy, cybersquatting and paid search scams in four categories; domain management, antifraud software, brand protection and antipiracy. The Idaho Statesman reported that "MarkMonitor safeguards more than half of the Fortune 100 brands".

MarkMonitor registers the domains and provides Whois and Registration Data Access Protocol (RDAP) lookup information for a variety of brands and companies. These companies include:

- Akamai
- Alibaba
- Amazon
- Anthropic
- AVG
- Baidu
- Sohu
- Carrd
- Coca-Cola
- CloudFront
- eBay
- Forbes
- Google
- Intuit
- LinkedIn
- Mattel
- Meta
- Microsoft
- Roblox
- Nintendo
- OpenAI
- Salesforce
- The Church of Scientology
- Square Enix
- Take-Two Interactive
- Tencent
- Tesco
- Valve Software
- Verizon
- Wikimedia Foundation
- YouTube
- Zenly
- Zoom Communications
