= Samir Arora =

Indian-American businessman

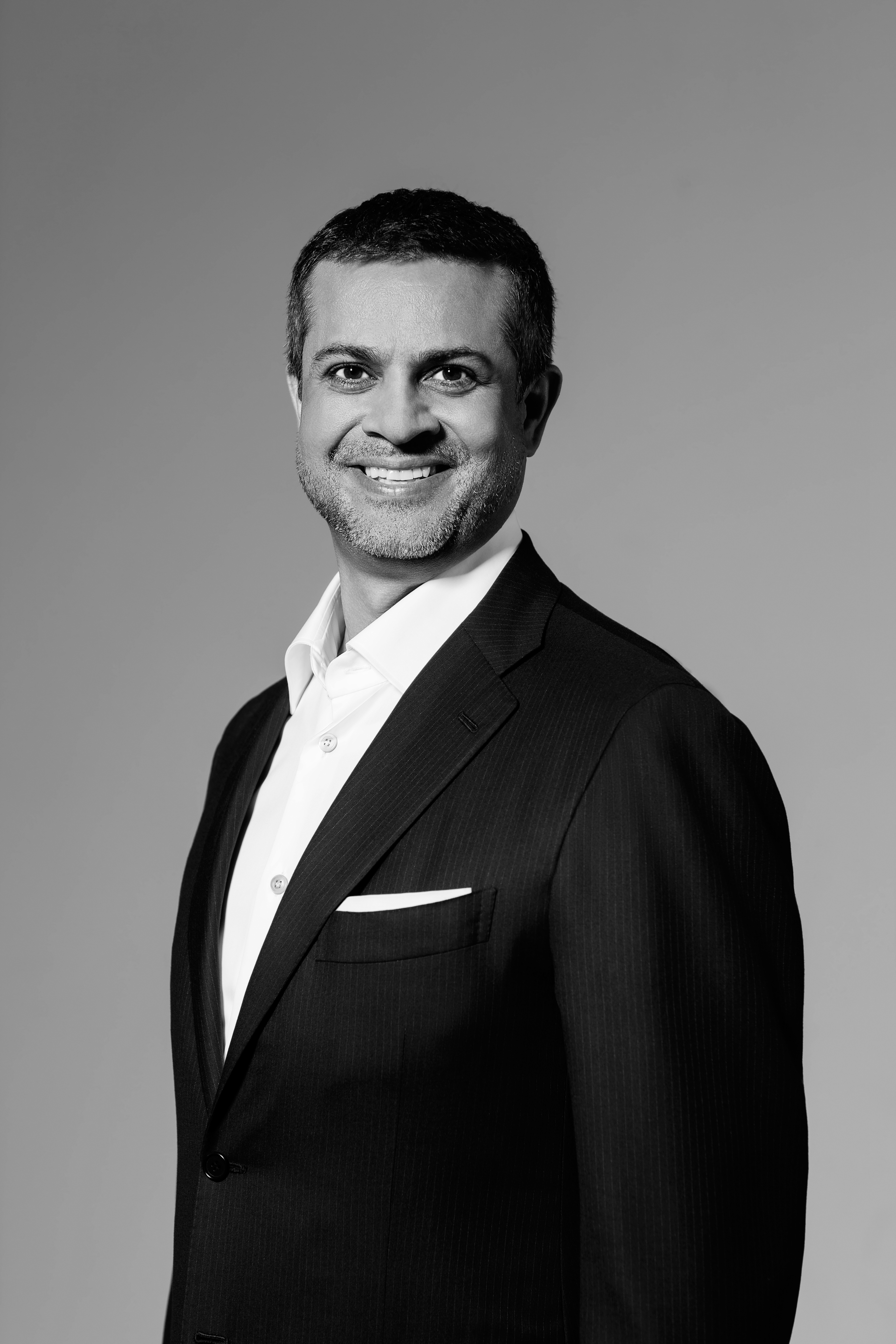
- Samir Arora in 2013
- Born: November 5, 1965 (age 61)
- Education: INSEAD, London Business School, BITS.
- Occupations: Founder & CEO, Kanza AI: Nate LM, Sage Assist
- Known for: at Apple Inc., Chairman of Information Capital, Co-founder & former CEO NetObjects, Founder & former CEO of Mode Media, Founder Project Bento, Sage Digital AI
- Website: www.samirarora.com

Samir Arora (born November 5, 1965) is an Indian-American businessman and CEO of Kanza AI, a health generative AI company, the former founder and CEO of Sage Digital AI from 2016 to 2021, and the former CEO of Mode Media (formerly Glam Media) from 2003 to April 2016. He was CEO and chairman of the web design company NetObjects, Inc. from 1995 to 2001 and at Apple Inc. from 1982 to 1991. Arora was selected as one of the 21 Internet Pioneers that shaped the World Wide Web at the 1st Web Innovators Awards by CNET in 1997.

== Early life and education ==
Samir Arora was born in New Delhi and studied electrical and electronic engineering at Birla Institute of Technology and Science. Arora has an EMP from INSEAD, attended Executive Education at Harvard Business School, and holds a diploma in Sales and Marketing from the London Business School.

== Career ==
Arora worked at Apple in Software and New Media from 1982 to 1991. He wrote a white paper called "Information Navigation: The Future of Computing" in late 1986 while working directly for the chairman and CEO of Apple,. Arora left Apple to found the spin-off Rae Technology from Apple.

From 1992 to 1995, Arora was chairman and chief executive officer of Rae Technology. In 1995 Samir Arora co-founded NetObjects, Inc. and together with a design and development team including David Kleinberg, Clement Mok and his brother, Sal Arora, created NetObjects Fusion, one of the first Web design products that allowed Web sites to be designed, structured and created without programming.

In 1997, after the launch of NetObjects Fusion, IBM invested approximately $100 million in a share exchange to buy 80% of NetObjects, corresponding to a valuation of around $150 million. NetObjects, Inc. went public on NASDAQ in 1999 with IBM staying the majority shareholder. From June 2003 to February 2004, Arora served as chairman of the board of Tickle, Inc., one of the first social networking sites founded in 1999, and helped create a joint venture with Masayoshi Son at Softbank in Japan. Tickle was acquired by Monster.com in May 2004.

In 2003, Mode Media (formerly Project Y and then Glam Media), Inc. was formed by a number of people including Arora. Arora was the interim CEO of Glam Media from 2003 to 2005, and CEO from 2006 to 2016. For his work at Mode Media, Arora was included by MIN Magazine in the Digital Hot List 2008 and was named Web 2.0's Don Draper as one of the 30 men shaping our digital future by GQ Magazine In June 2017, a year and a half after the departure of Samir Arora and Marc Andreessen, Mode Media U.S. was acquired, and in 2022 became a part of Static Networks. Mode Media continued its operations in International and in January, 2017 an investment group Montaro purchased Mode Media in Japan. In March, 2017 shareholders appointed Samir Arora as the executive chairman of Mode Media in Japan.

In April 2016, Samir Arora founded Sage Digital AI, a new AI verified experts platform startup and currently operates as its chairman. Sage began with 100 manually curated experts and has grown to 1M experts and influencers and 6 million businesses, with data ingestion that powered the early Sage AI Agents for Brands. In July 2023, Samir created SageAssist AI, a vertical generative AI company.

In September 2021, Samir Arora founded Kyro Digital, one of the first Web 3.0 AI application—enablement platform. Kyro added Peter Leeb, Darshana Munde, Liz Thompson, Arfat Allarakha and Muoi Lam as co-founders and venture funds Drive Capital, Decasonic, Fenbushi Capital, Information Capital, LLC, Signum Capital, UOB Venture Management, Woodside Incubator and the web 3.0 companies Avalanche (Blizzard), Polygon, Rally, Tezos and Kadena and Brad Koenig as investors.

In July 2023, Samir founded Kanza AI, a health generative AI Domain LM company, and serves as its Founder and CEO.

== Patents ==
For his early work on the internet and web sites, Samir has been granted 18 US patents, including the first web site structure editor and HTML page layout editor Patents US patent 5911145 US patent 5845299

== Philanthropic ==
Since February 2004, Arora has been the Chairman of International Zen Therapy Institute, a 501(c)(3) organization based in Honolulu, that was founded by Dub Leigh with Daihonzan Chozen-ji and currently serves as its President and is the Shike of IZII and Zentherapy and Sōke, Founder of Yūdō as a lay Rinzai Rōshi, a successor in the Daihonzan Chozen-ji lineage of Dub Leigh and Tenshin Tanouye under the Tenryū-ji lineage of Ōmori Sōgen

In July 2020, Arora with Marcus Samuelsson, Derek Evens, and Brad Koenig created Project Bento Fund, a California nonprofit 501(c)(3) corporation to provides urgent support to restaurants, local, minority-owned, women-led and BIPIOC businesses and their employees most impacted by the COVID-19 pandemic, economic, racial and social crisis.

== Books ==
Arora was editor and publisher of the annual awards and book Foodie Top 100 Restaurants with contributing top food critics Patricia Wells, Ruth Reichl, Gael Greene, Masuhiro Yamamoto, Jonathan Gold, Bruno Verjus, Alexander Lobrano, Charles Campion, Vir Sanghvi, Aun Koh, Susumu Ohta, Kundo Koyama, Yuki Yamamura, Karen Brooks, Phil Vettel, Marie-Claude Lortie, Erika Lenkert and Diane Tapscott

== Bibliography ==
- Doug Menuez: Fearless Genius. The Digital Revolution in Silicon Valley 1985−2000. Atria Books, New York 2014. P. 150−167.
