= Fake blog =

Promotional website in blog format

A fake blog (sometimes shortened to flog or flack blog) is a communication in the blog format that appears to originate from a credible source, but which in fact is created by another entity for the purpose of marketing a product, service, or political viewpoint. The purpose of a fake blog is to inspire viral marketing or create an internet meme that generates traffic and interest in a product.

As social networking tools gain in popularity, corporations and special-interest groups legitimately use their own blogs to promote company agendas without cloaking their identities, without fakery.

== Astroturfing ==
A fake blog is akin to industry-supported "astroturf" efforts that pose as legitimate grassroots activity. Fake blogs are corrupted forms of public relations, which as a discipline demands transparency and honesty, according to the Public Relations Society of America's code of ethics and the Word of Mouth Marketing Association's code of ethics. Authenticity and transparency are important in social networking and blogging, as these codes of ethics attest. The UK Chartered Institute of Public Relations' social media guidelines cite the Consumer Protection from Unfair Trading Regulations 2008 and state that both astroturfing and fake blogs are not permitted.

== Example ==
One notorious example of identity cloaking, resulting in a fake blog, was exposed when Edelman, an international public relations firm, created a fake blog in 2006 called Walmarting Across America. It was purportedly written by two Wal-Mart "enthusiasts" who decided to journey across the United States in an RV, blogging about the experience as they visited Wal-Marts along the way. While two people actually did travel across the United States in an RV, the publicity stunt was revealed to be paid for by Wal-Mart, a client of Edelman.

== Fake parody blogs ==
One genre of fake blogs is the parody blog; written ostensibly by a celebrity or other noteworthy individual. Unlike other flogs, parody blogs are not necessarily marketing tools. Parody blogs are often written to entertain, confuse, enlighten or to express a point of view through satire and humor. Noteworthy parody blogs include Fake Steve Jobs.
