= Network Solutions =

American-based technology company

Network Solutions, LLC
- Type: Subsidiary
- Industry: Internet, IT Services
- Predecessor: Web.com
- Founded: 1979; 47 years ago
- Headquarters: Jacksonville, Florida, U.S.
- Services: Domain name registration; Web hosting; Web site design; Search engine marketing; SSL certificates; E-mail hosting
- Parent: Newfold Digital
- Website: networksolutions.com

Network Solutions, LLC is an American-based technology company and a subsidiary of Newfold Digital. In addition to being a domain registrar, Network Solutions provides web services such as web hosting and online marketing, including search engine optimization and pay per click management.

== History ==
Network Solutions started as a technology consulting company incorporated by Emmit McHenry with Ty Grigsby, Gary Desler, and Ed Peters in Washington, D.C., in 1979.

In its first few years, the company focused on systems programming services, primarily in the IBM environment. Annual revenues passed $1 million in 1982, growing to $18.5 million in 1986.

Network Solutions, Inc. (NSI) first operated the domain name system (DNS) registry under a sub-contract with the U.S. Defense Information Systems Agency (DISA) in September 1991. NSI gave out names in the .com, .org, .mil, .gov, .edu and .net Top Level Domains (TLDs) for free, along with free Internet Protocol (IP) address blocks. The Network Information Center at SRI International had performed the work under Elizabeth J. Feinler since 1972.

In 1992, NSI was the sole bidder on a grant from the National Science Foundation (NSF) to further develop the domain name registration service for the Internet. In 1993, NSI was granted an exclusive contract by the NSF to be the sole domain name registrar for .com (commerce), .net (network) and .org (organization) TLDs, a continuation of work NSI had already been doing. NSI also maintained the central database of assigned names called WHOIS. A contract was given to Boeing to operate the .mil TLD registry, and was also performed by NSI under subcontract.

In May 1993, the NSF privatized the domain name registry; Network Solutions was the only bidder on the $5.9 million annual contract to administer it.

In March 1995, the company was acquired by Science Applications International Corporation (SAIC) for $4.7 million. At that time, the company managed 60,000 domain names.

Following the acquisition by SAIC, the NSF gave Network Solutions authority to charge for domain name registrations. Network Solutions imposed a charge of $100 for two years' registration. 30% of this revenue went to the NSF to create an "Internet Intellectual Infrastructure Fund". In 1997, a lawsuit was filed charging Network Solutions with antitrust violations with regard to domain names. The 30% of the registration fee that went to the NSF was ruled by a court to be an illegal tax. This led to a reduction in the domain name registration fee to $70 (for two years).

Network Solutions also implemented a policy of censoring domain names. This came to light when Jeff Gold attempted to register the domain name shitakemushrooms.com but was unable to. Network Solutions' automated screening system blocked the registration "because it contains four letters they consider obscene", though the domain name 'shit.com' had been successfully registered. Network Solutions argued that it was within its First Amendment rights to block words it found offensive, even though it was operating pursuant to contract with a Federal agency.

Network Solutions' $100 charge and its monopoly position in the market were contributing pressures that resulted in the creation of the International Ad Hoc Committee and a failed attempt to take control of the domain name system, and to the U.S. Department of Commerce and National Telecommunications and Information Administration (NTIA) releasing a white paper and ultimately contracting with the Internet Corporation for Assigned Names and Numbers (ICANN) to administer the DNS.

In September 1997, the Network Solutions (Nasdaq: NSOL) became a public company via an initial public offering (IPO).

After the formation of ICANN in 1998, the domain name industry opened up to partial competition, with NSI retaining its monopoly on .com, .net and .org but having to recognize a separation between the functions of a registry, which manages the underlying database of domain names, and that of a registrar, which acts as a retail provider of domain names. To achieve this separation, NSI created a "firewall" between the two new divisions of the business, creating separate technical infrastructure, organizations, and facilities. By the end of 1999 the fee for registration had been reduced, from $34.99, to a wholesale rate of $6 per year to registered resellers.

In May 1999, Jim Rutt was named chief executive officer of the company; he stepped down in February 2001.

In 2000, at the peak of the dot-com bubble, the company was acquired by VeriSign for $21 billion in stock.

On October 17, 2003, VeriSign sold Network Solutions' registrar unit to Pivotal Equity Group for $100 million, but retained the registry.

In January 2006, Network Solutions acquired MonsterCommerce, an e-commerce company in the Greater St. Louis area.

In February 2007, General Atlantic, a private equity firm, acquired the company for a reported $800 million.

In January 2008, Roy Dunbar was appointed CEO.

On November 2, 2009, Tim Kelly, president of the company, replaced Dunbar as CEO. Dunbar continued to act as chairman and advisor to the company.

In August 2011, Web.com announced the acquisition of the company for $405 million and 18 million shares of newly issued Web.com stock, which closed at $8.66 per share before the announcement, for a total purchase price of about $560 million. The acquisition was completed on October 27, 2011.

This was immediately followed by the departure of CEO Kelly and other leadership. Large-scale employee layoffs began the following day as well. By December 31, 2011, over half of the office space in the Herndon, Virginia, headquarters had been vacated, and on March 31, 2012, the company's Belleville, Illinois, office was closed.

In June 2020, Network Solutions revoked the domain name registration of two hate sites (VDARE and niggermania.com) after receiving a demand letter from the Lawyers' Committee for Civil Rights Under Law, a civil rights organization.

On April 24, 2025, Web.com announced its merger with Network Solutions, with the Web.com brand transitioning to operate under the Network Solutions name. This strategic consolidation is part of a broader initiative by its parent company, Newfold Digital, to streamline its portfolio of brands. Newfold Digital has undertaken similar integrations, merging brands such as iPage, HostMonster, FatCow, and JustHost into its leading web hosting provider, Bluehost.

== 2008 domain name front running class action lawsuit ==
Network Solutions offers a search engine that permits users to find out if a domain name is available for purchase. Unregistered domain names entered into this search engine are then speculatively reserved by Network Solutions. This "reservation" can be removed by anyone immediately by contacting Network Solutions customer service hotline, or it will automatically unreserve within four days, allowing the domain to be freely registered anywhere. Also, visitors searching for domain names on its website allow the reservation when they click "OK" on the Reservation Confirmation dialog box. Clicking "Cancel" will prevent the domain name from being reserved.

On January 8, 2008, Domain Name Wire published a story alleging that Network Solutions practices domain name front running. "If you try to register a domain at Network Solutions, but decide not to register it, you won't be able to register it anywhere else", the article says. "Network Solutions registers the domain in its company name with the words 'This Domain is available at NetworkSolutions.com'." Circle ID reported on January 8, 2008, that Jonathon Nevett, Vice President of Policy at Network Solutions and one of the seven members of the ICANN community who was consulted by the ICANN committee looking at registrar abuse of domain "tasting", as the availability search practice is called, had offered a response to the news story stating Network Solutions' policy. The policy was "a security measure to protect our customers", said Nevett. "When a customer searches for an available domain name at our website, but decides not to purchase the name immediately after conducting the search", Nevett added, "after the search ends, we will put the domain name on reserve." Nevett said that if the domain was "not purchased within 4 days, it will be released back to the registry and will be generally available for registration." But once a name was supposedly "reserved" for a potential customer, not only was it not available at any less expensive registrar, but the fee charged by Network Solutions went up to $35 instead of the original fee charged of around $10.

Jay Westerdal, one of the seven members of the ICANN community who was consulted by the ICANN committee looking at domain tasting abuse, published an article on Domain Tools on January 8, 2008, stating that Network Solutions is exposing the domains to domain tasters. The domain tasters "will snipe those domain up milliseconds after Network Solutions deletes them", says Westerdal. "It is a deplorable action that Network Solutions would announce potential domain names to the entire world", Westerdal added. On January 8, 2008, Tucows, the largest publicly traded domain name registrar, published an article on its company web site titled "Registrar Reputation and Trust" criticizing Network Solutions policy. "Potential Registrants are effectively forced to purchase the domain from Network Solutions for a period of four days at which point the domain is dropped", wrote Tucows employee James Koole. Koole says that Tucows has found a way to address the issue of domain tasting and has policies in place that uphold the rights of Registrants. "Tucows works to prevent domain name tasting by charging our Resellers a monetary fee on domain name registrations that are cancelled within the five-day Add Grace Period (AGP)", Koole said. "Tucows doesn't use WHOIS query data or search data from our API to front-run domain names", Koole added.

On January 9, 2008, CNET reported that Network Solutions will soon not register domains when people search for domains from the company's Whois search page, will offer only an "under construction" page for sites that it has reserved, and newly reserved pages won't be linked to the numerical Internet addresses that allow Web browsers to locate the pages. Network Solutions will continue to register domains when people search for domains from the company's home page.

=== Class action and resolution ===
On February 25, 2008, law firms Kabateck LLP, (then Kabateck Brown Kellner), and Engstrom, Lipscomb & Lack, filed class-action lawsuits, McElroy v. Network Solutions LLC, et al. and James Lee Finseth v. Network Solutions LLC, against the company for front running, which was settled in favor of the plaintiffs, in 2009.

== Controversies ==
=== Server breach ===
In July 2009, Network Solutions notified customers that its servers were breached, which led to the exposure of names, addresses, and credit card numbers of more than 573,000 people who made purchases on websites hosted by the company. Hackers inserted malicious code to intercept eCommerce transactions and gather personal and financial information from March 12 to June 8 of that year.

=== Malware ===
One year later in August 2010, Network Solutions discovered that one of its widgets offered to its domain registration and hosting customers was capable of distributing malware by sites displaying it. As many as 5,000,000 of its registered domains may have been affected by the hack. The affected widget was at least temporarily addressed by Network Solutions, who were able to make changes to the code to prevent it from loading.

=== WebLock Service ===
In January, 2014 Network Solutions' marketing department sent an email to customers stating that the company would be automatically enrolling customers in a new security program called WebLock, for an initial charge of $1,850 for the first year and $1,350 each subsequent year. The company claimed the cost offset new security features to protect domains, including registering as a "certified user" and confirmation of configuration changes with those "certified users".

... To help recapture the costs of maintaining this extra level of security for your account, your credit card will be billed $1,850 for the first year of service on the date your program goes live... After that you will be billed $1,350 on every subsequent year from that date. If you wish to opt out of this program you may do so by calling us at 1-888-642-0265.

Web.com COO Jason Teichman later clarified that the program would actually be opt-in, saying "we did not do a good job in wording that [email]" and "It's not our intention to enroll anyone in a program they don't want."

=== Publishing Non-Public Information ===
In September, 2009, Network Solutions began publishing a list of domain name WHOIS searches performed by customers and other service users in the past day.

=== Fitna controversy ===
In March 2008, "Fitnathemovie.com", a website that Dutch politician Geert Wilders had reserved at Network Solutions, was taken offline. Wilders intended to host a film he had created, Fitna. At that time, the only page on the site was a picture of the Qur'an accompanied by the text "Geert Wilders presents Fitna" and "Coming soon". Network Solutions' notice stated that it was "investigating whether the site's content is in violation of the Network Solutions Acceptable Use Policy". Wilders said the 15-minute film will show how verses from the Qur'an are being used today to incite modern Muslims to behave violently and anti-democratically. Network Solutions spokesperson Susan Wade stated that Network Solutions had received several complaints regarding the website, but she did not elaborate on the specific nature of the complaints. Despite being taken offline by Network Solutions, the film was able to debut on Liveleak where it received about three million views before it was taken down due to Liveleak receiving threats.

Network Solutions also came under criticism because although it refused to host Wilders' website, it had provided registration services for the Hezbollah domain hizbollah.org. In response to these criticisms, Network Solutions agreed that hizbollah.org violated its acceptable use policy and ceased hosting that web site, as well.

Due to heavy media coverage, many people were aware of the film's existence and the controversy surrounding its domain name. Some were outraged by the actions of Network Solutions in dealing with one of its customers. Freedom of speech protesters created videos commenting on the situation, and some uploaded Wilders' film to social networking sites such as YouTube shortly after its release. Protesters for both sides created their own blogs and video statements on the matter. Anti-censorship protesters took their campaigns to sites such as YouTube in order to alert others of the situation.

=== Controversy over subdomain hijacking ===
In April 2008, reports indicated that in addition to the aforementioned front-running practices, Network Solutions had begun exploiting an obscure provision of its end-user license agreement that permits it to use and advertise on its users' unassigned subdomains, even despite the registration and private ownership of the top-level domain itself. The provision states:

'You also agree that any domain name directory, sub-directory, file name or path (e.g.) that does not resolve to an active web page on your Web site being hosted by Network Solutions, may be used by Network Solutions to place a "parking" page, "under construction" page, or other temporary page that may include promotions and advertisements for, and links to, Network Solutions' Web site...'"

Ars Technica has documented how to opt out of this scheme.

=== Races.com controversy ===
According to a Wired.com article, in 1999 Network Solutions bungled the transfer of "races.com", accidentally placing it back into the pool of available domain names. MBA student John McLanahan purchased the domain privately for thousands of dollars. A domain name speculator was able to obtain it, and demanded $500,000 for its return.

=== Misleading customers over refunds ===
In April 2015, the Federal Trade Commission announced that Network Solutions had agreed to settle charges that it misled consumers who bought web hosting services by promising a full refund if they canceled within 30 days. In reality, the FTC stated, the company withheld substantial cancellation fees amounting to up to 30 percent of the refund.

== See also ==
- Domain Name System
