= Globalscape =

Software developer in Texas, US

Globalscape, a HelpSystems Company
- Type: Private
- Industry: Managed File Transfer, Information Security, Network Management, Secure File Transfer
- Founded: 1996
- Headquarters: San Antonio, Texas, US
- Website: www.globalscape.com

GlobalScape, Inc. (AMEX:GSB) is a software developer headquartered in San Antonio, Texas, US.

== History ==
Globalscape was founded in 1996 as a wholly owned subsidiary of American Telesource Incorporated (ATSI). The firm's original product released in 1996 was CuteFTP, an FTP (File Transfer Protocol) client application for Windows and Mac platforms. This product remains in development. The company also provides information exchange services for consumer and enterprise customers. Approximately 80% of its revenue is derived from its enterprise software product line.

These lines include products in the managed file transfer (MFT), information security (InfoSec), enterprise mobility management (EMM), and identity access management (IAM), and Software as a Service (SaaS) categories. IDC, Gartner and Aberdeen Group have published reports on these products . The EFT platform offers modules for secure file transfer (SFTP), workflow automation, HTTP/HTTPS, AS2, OpenPGP, Regulatory Compliance, Auditing and Reporting. Compliance modules help with HIPAA, PCI DSS, GDPR, HITECH, SOX, and other regulations.

The firm also offers file synchronization and sharing services and products or FSS, which utilizes data replication and continuous data protection software for real-time enterprise collaboration file sharing and backups.

In 2000, Globalscape made a brief foray into P2P file-sharing by releasing CuteMX. CuteMX was a program that was similar to Napster but was discontinued in July 2000.

Globalscape's first cloud offering is called Managed Information Xchange or MIX. Sales and distribution partners include numerous technology distributors, such as Ingram Micro, MAPS of Mexico, and Lifeboat Distribution, and since early 2014 has pursued the North American channel distribution and reseller market.

Globalscape is member since 2007 of the Payment Card Industry Security Standards Council (PCI SSC), which publishes the PCI Data Security Standards, the last of which is PCI DSS 3.0.

On May 16, 2016, James Bindseil announced his resignation following a very low first-quarter earnings report compared to 2015's earnings. Matt Goulet was announced as CEO and president effective immediately. Goulet was CEO until April 2019 when he died unexpectedly. Robert Alpert, chairman of the board, was later named Interim CEO.

Globalscape launched a new cloud-based MFT offering, EFT Arcus, in January 2018.

On August 28, 2020, HelpSystems completed tender offer to acquire GlobalSCAPE.

== Partnerships ==
Globalscape's Tappin was used by Seagate on several different network attached storage lines, labeled as Seagate Global Access. Other partners in the NAS industry include Toshiba, QNAP and Scale Computing. Antivirus maker ESET also used Tappin to provide secure remote access to their client base, and Rackspace uses it to connect to data in the cloud.

== Acquisitions ==
In September 2006, Globalscape purchased Andover, Massachusetts-based Availl Inc., whose file collaboration and data protection software is now known as WAFS, or Wide Area File Services.

In 2011, Globalscape purchased TappIn, a Seattle-based startup company formerly known as HomePipe Networks for $17 million.

== Business Products ==
- Enhanced File Transfer EFT Platform:
  - Enhanced File Transfer Express
  - Enhanced File Transfer Enterprise
  - Enhanced File Transfer ARCUS
- DMZ Gateway
- Tiered Technical Support Packages
  - Basic
  - Professional
  - Premier
  - Expert
- Professional Services
  - Assessment, Implementation, Deployment and Automation services
  - Systems and Data Integration
  - Health Checks and Maintenance
  - Professional Training and Certification
- Modules and Add-ons
  - Accelerate Module
  - Accelerated Development
  - Advanced Workflow Engine (AWE)
  - Advanced Security Module (ASM)
  - Audity & Reporting Module (ARM)
  - AS2 Module
  - Business Activity Monitoring (BAM)
  - DMZ Gateway
  - EFT Insight
  - Express Security Module (ESM)
  - HTTP/HTTPS Module
  - Mobile Transfer Client (MTC)
  - OpenPGP Module
  - Remote Agent Module (RAM)
  - SFTP Module
  - Web Transfer Client (WTC)
  - Workspaces
  - CuteFTP

== Personal Products ==
- CuteFTP – FTP client
