= Domain name drop list =

A domain name drop list is a list containing the expired domain names that could be deleted from the domain name registry in the near future. These lists are typically used by domain name speculators to locate expiring domain names with value.

== Drop list contents ==
There is no defined date range for data contained with a drop list, as they can contain anywhere between 1 day's worth of expiring domain names, to 30 or more days worth. Some drop lists contain only domain names that follow the domain name deletion process (where the domain name enters the REGISTRAR-HOLD status, followed by REDEMPTIONPERIOD, and PENDINGDELETE), some contain only pre-release domain names, and some contain both pre-release and regular domain names.

The data contained within a drop list can also vary, with some lists providing only basic information, such as the domain name and its expiry date. Other drop lists provide more detailed statistics, including, among others, PageRank, Link popularity and Alexa rank.

Critics say that promotion and marketing of so-called droplists may encourage cybercrime and payoffs at registrars, indicating that a registrants can lose their domains without abandon.

== Dropcatching ==
When a domain name is abandoned, or the period of validity is not renewed (expires), the webhost and registrar then action a "deletion" (the drop). Once a domain name has been deleted from the internet, it ceases to exist. Anyone may then register that name (the catch). The process of re-registering expired names is known as dropcatching and various domain name registries have differing views on it. Sometimes, people get locked out of their email and cannot reply to the renew request (or otherwise obstructed or hacked), and their domainname may be deleted and offered as available.

== See also ==
- Cybercriminal deletion of registry data
- Domain name speculation#Secondary market speculation
