= NetObjects =

Software company

NetObjects, Inc.
- Type: Incorporation
- Industry: Internet, software
- Founded: 1995 (closed 2001, re-established 2009)
- Headquarters: Redwood City, California (1995–2001); Doylestown, Pennsylvania (2009–present)
- Key people: Samir Arora, founder Steve Raubenstine, President and CEO
- Products: Web design applications, Content management systems
- Revenue: $34.2 million USD (2000)
- Number of employees: ~240 (2000)
- Website: www.netobjects.com

NetObjects, Inc. is a software company founded in 1995 by Samir Arora, David Kleinberg, Clement Mok and Sal Arora. The company is best known for the development of NetObjects Fusion, a web design application for small and medium enterprises with designers who need complete control over page layout and a similar user interface as desktop publishing applications.

In its first phase, NetObjects was based in Redwood City, California, and ceased operations in 2001 after selling its assets to Website Pros (now Web.com) and a portfolio of patents to Macromedia.

In 2009 NetObjects was re-established as an independent software company.

== History ==
=== Beginnings ===
From 1992 to 1995 the founders of NetObjects had worked at Rae Technology and before that in part at Apple Computer investigating proto-types of web browsers, information navigation and web design tools.

In 1995 NetObjects was founded to market NetObjects Fusion, a new design tool to build web sites. The term "web site", well-known and widespread today, was created by the work of Samir Arora, David Kleinberg, Clement Mok and Sal Arora. and they were awarded the first web site builder patent as inventors.

Initially NetObjects was as a privately held company with the Series A venture investment led by Rae Technology, Series B by Norwest Venture Partners and Venrock Associates, followed by Novell, Mitsubishi and AT&T Ventures and the last round by Perseus Capital, L.L.C.

In April 1997 IBM invested $100 million to acquire a majority of the company. The deal had a valuation of $150 million.

=== Launch of NetObjects Fusion and IPO ===
NetObjects Fusion 1.0 was released in 1996. As the first complete web design tool it was seen as groundbreaking by technology observers. NetObjects was elected as one of "25 Cool Technology Companies" of 1996 by Fortune. Also in 1996, NetObjects Fusion won PC Magazine's Editors' Choice award. CNET's Builder.com elected Samir Arora one of the Web Innovators of 1997, and in 1998 NetObjects received the prestigious Gold award from the Industrial Designers Society of America (IDSA).

Eleven U.S. patents were granted for Internet-related technologies (design and utility).

Releases 2.0 (1997) and 3.0 (1998) of NetObjects Fusion again gained positive reactions by the PC press as well as commercial success on the market. In 1999 IBM brought NetObjects to the stock exchange with initial public offering while remaining the major shareholder. The initial public offering (IPO) on NASDAQ raised $72 million.

The board of directors consisted of six people: Samir Arora as chairman of the board, chief executive officer and president, and five directors, including John Sculley from Apple Computer, three representatives from IBM and one from Novell.

=== Success on the market and the stock exchange ===
In the following years numerous product-bundling deals were made with nearly all the big PC sellers like Dell and HP, and with Internet service providers like UUNET, Earthlink or 1 & 1 (Germany). The company itself said it licensed the distribution of more than 15 million copies of NetObjects Fusion.

In 2000 the publicly listed price of NETO (ticker symbol) reached its record high of $45 11/16 USD, making NetObjects worth $1.5 billion.

Revenue had started at $7.2 million in 1997, reached $15 million in 1998, $23.2 million in 1999 and peaked at $34.2 million for fiscal year 2000 (October 1999 - September 2000).

On March 3, 2000, TheStreet.com's Adam Lashinsky praised NetObject's financial performance and its early adoption of e-business:

"And, more so than many start-ups, NetObjects has managed to deliver on what it has promised. It has slightly beaten the expectations of the friendly analysts who follow it. And quarter by quarter, it has steadily reduced its operating losses. Plus, it got lucky. It was firmly entrenched as a business-to-business software company before the term gained currency and B2B companies took off."

=== Shift in strategy ===
In 1998 the company had developed and since then distributed NetObjects Authoring Suite and the related "Collage" product, which as content management solutions were aimed at big businesses and ranged at much higher price levels than NetObjects Fusion.

However, IBM and NetObjects decided that its target market was the sector of small and medium enterprises, so it would focus on its flagship application NetObjects Fusion which would fit within the scope of these customers.

In the beginnings of the concept of "software as a service" (SaaS), the company secondly made a bet on its ability to recognize technological trends and coined a strategy shift to a subscription model. To this end NetObjects Matrix was developed and GoBizGo.com, an e-commerce solution was started. Subscribing web and online services would help small businesses keep pace with the Internet. To finance this shift of strategy, the NetObjects Enterprise Division with 40 employees along with two applications, Collage and NetObjects Authoring Suite, was sold for $18 million to UK-based Merant (merged in 2004 with Serena Software Inc., based in San Mateo, California).

High hopes were based on the NetObjects Matrix platform and its possibilities to position NetObjects as a "Business Service Provider". A version for Mac was announced, and a cooperation with IBM Global Services was forged.

=== Challenges and crisis ===
However, several factors led NetObjects to a crisis starting in 2000. Tough competition from Microsoft, Macromedia and Adobe put pressure on market share and falling prices of web-design applications affected revenues. Also, long-term revenue effects of bundling deals in the software industry are controversial. NetObjects slashed prices for NetObjects Fusion from release 1.0 to release 4.0 by more than 50%. Older versions stayed in distribution for even lower prices. Technical demands for large business web sites changed and required direct access of programmers to HTML code — which NetObjects Fusion was not designed for. Its target market were designers who need complete control over page layout and a similar user interface as desktop publishing applications.

=== IBM decisions and sale of NetObjects ===
In 2001 revenue decreased sharply, a result of changing markets, price cuts, strategy shift to Software as a Service. Subscription fees from NetObjects Matrix started coming in but the company faced losses: total revenues for the first three quarters of FY 2001 were $4.22 million, whilst costs were $7.67 million.

NetObjects started to raise $50 million in a private placement with Deutsche Bank. But IBM, which controlled the NetObjects Board, did not approve the placement. In the summer of 2001, the markets plummeted with the bursting of the dot-com bubble. And ultimately IBM as the majority shareholder decided to sell NetObjects.

NetObjects Fusion, NetObjects Matrix including the MatrixBuilder, BizGoBiz and other assets were sold to Website Pros (now Web.com), a web design and services company based in Jacksonville, Florida

Additionally a portfolio of seven patents was sold to Macromedia (now Adobe), the distributor of Dreamweaver, the long-term main competitor of NetObjects Fusion.

=== NetObjects as a division of Website Pros ===
Website Pros (WSP) (now Web.com) went on developing and distributing future versions of NetObjects Fusion and offering subscription services based on this application, representing the mixed business model that was invented at NetObjects.

License revenue from sales of NetObjects Fusion reached nearly $3.58 million in 2006, $2.4 million in 2007, and $2.5 million in 2008. In May 2009 NetObjects Fusion was sold.

=== NetObjects as a re-established company ===
In May 2009 NetObjects Inc. was re-established as an independent company. It acquired the NetObjects Fusion product line from Web.com. A smaller part of the amount was transferred instantly, while $3.0 million remained payable from future revenue of NetObjects Fusion sales until 2013.

Steve Raubenstine, who was vice president of the NetObjects Fusion division at Web.com (former Website Pros), serves as president and CEO of the new NetObjects Inc.

== Products ==
- NetObjects Fusion: Web design tool created in 1996. Sold to Website Pros (now Newfold Digital) in 2001. In 2009 a management buyout of the NetObjects Fusion division of Website Pros created the second coming of an independent NetObjects. Fusion was the main part of what management bought. NetObjects still distributes Fusion. The latest release is Version 15, Update #1. NetObjects released Update #1 in March 2015.
- NetObjects Authoring Server: Collaborative Web development and content management solution. Created in 1999. Sold to UK-based Merant in 2000. After Merant's merger with Serena Software in 2004, distributed as "Collage". Discontinued in 2008. The predecessor of Authoring Server was NetObjects Team Fusion, introduced as a client–server application in 1998.
- NetObjects MatrixBuilder: Online Web Page and Web Service builder, first released in 2000. Sold to Website Pros (now Newfold Digital) in 2001. Website Pros sold MatrixBuilder licenses directly to customers. Website Pros also used MatrixBuilder internally to develop websites for customers.
