= Web.com =

Website building, domain registration, and website hosting company

- Web.com Logo
- Formerly: Website Pros Inc.
- Type: Private
- Traded as: Nasdaq: WEB
- Predecessor: Atlantic Teleservices
- Founded: 1999; 27 years ago
- Defunct: June 18, 2025
- Fate: Merged into Network Solutions
- Successor: Network Solutions
- Headquarters: 5335 Gate Pkwy, Jacksonville, FL 32256, Jacksonville, Florida, United States
- Key people: Sharon Rowlands (CEO)
- Products: Domain name registration; web development; website builder; web design; web hosting; website governance; e-commerce; lead generation; mobile commerce; online advertising; search engine optimization
- Owner: Newfold Digital
- Website: web.com

Web.com was an American dot-com company that provided a website builder, along with website hosting, domain name registration, web development, and various digital marketing services. It served as a partner for very small to small-sized businesses and entrepreneurs, assisting them in establishing and expanding their online presence.

The company was founded in 1999 by Darin Brannan in Jacksonville, Florida as Website Pros Inc.. In early 2008 it took its current name after acquiring Atlanta-based company Web.com, which was founded in 1981 by Waldemar Fernández and was formerly known as Interland, Inc.

In 2018, Web.com was acquired by Siris Capital Group. In 2021, Web.com merged with Endurance Web Presence to form Newfold Digital, a joint venture between Clearlake Capital and Siris Capital Group.

In 2025, Web.com was merged into Network Solutions.

== Corporate overview ==
Web.com is based in Jacksonville, Florida and incorporated in Delaware, and provides domain name registration and web development services, among others. The company caters to very small and small businesses and offers a variety of subscription services designed for entrepreneurs including, design, hosting, management, e-commerce, lead generation, mobile commerce, online advertising, search engine optimization, and social media solutions.

Web.com reportedly had 3.3 million subscribers in January 2016. The company has offices in more than 20 U.S. states, and in Argentina (Buenos Aires), Canada (Barrie, Ontario, and Nova Scotia), and the United Kingdom (including Cardiff, Wales). Web.com was traded as "WEB" on NASDAQ.

David Brown served as Web.com's chief executive officer (CEO) until early 2019. Okumus Fund Management was the company's top shareholder, with 18.64 percent as of March 2017. In 2015, Okumus and Web.com agreed to appoint two independent directors to its board.

In 2017, the company had 3,500 employees and a $1.21 billion valuation.

== History ==
=== Website Pros Inc. ===
David Brown established Website Pros Inc.'s predecessor, the technology services company Atlantic Teleservices, Inc., in Jacksonville in 1997. Brown served as CEO until 1999, when he sold the company to Website Pros, via Norwest Venture Partners. Website Pros was founded in 1999 by Darin Brannan. Brown joined the company's board of directors.

The company planned to establish a chain of stores for people to access services to develop and maintain their own websites. The Collapse of the .com market in 2000, required the company to shift from a retail model to an indirect sales model to conserve capital. Brown then oversaw a series of acquisitions, averaging one per year for a decade. The largest of the acquired companies was NetObjects, a Redwood City, California-based software company best known for developing the web design tool NetObjects Fusion. Website Pros purchased the company, including its GoBizGo and NetObjects Matrix assets, in October 2001 for an undisclosed amount.

Website Pros acquired the Spokane-based e-commerce services provider Innuity in 2002, resulting in the merged company's change from an upfront fee structure to monthly subscriptions. The company was growing by 40 percent annually by 2003, and had 260 employees (around 150 in Jacksonville and 110 in Spokane) by the end of the year. Website Pros received $17 million in venture capital, which included $10 million in December 2003 from Insight Venture Partners and $7 million Norwest in April 2004. The Jacksonville Business Journal reported that Website Pros had 40,000 clients, including Discover Business Services and IBM, at the time the company secured funding from Norwest. Brown began preparing Website Pros for an initial public offering in 2004, and the company went public in 2005. Website Pros acquired eBoz and Leads.com, and reported $37.8 million in sales, in 2005. In 2006, Julius Genachowski joined Web.com's board, along with Hugh M. Durden and G. Harry Durity. Website Pros acquired the Canadian company 1ShoppingCart.com, which offers software e-commerce services, for $12.5 million, as well as Renex, an online lead generation provider for contractors and homeowners, in late 2006.

In 2007, Website Pros acquired the Atlanta-based company Web.com, which was founded in 1981 and formerly known as Interland, Inc. Under the agreement, which was valued at $129 million, Website Pros paid $25 million in cash and the rest in stock. Brown continued to serve as chairman and CEO of the merged company, and Jeff Stibel, who was serving as president and CEO of Web.com, became a president and board member of Website Pros. The company remained headquartered in Jacksonville, and the merger resulted in a more than three-fold increase in the number of paid subscribers.

=== Web.com (2008–2025) ===
Website Pros changed its name to Web.com in early 2008. In June, the company began trading as "WWWW" on NASDAQ; executives commemorated the change by closing the stock exchange at Times Square's NASDAQ MarketSite on June 9. Stibel served as president until 2009. Web.com had nearly one million subscribers and was earning $120 million in revenue by the end of 2010.

In 2012, the company became the title sponsor of the Web.com Tour, a developmental professional golf tour for the U.S.-based PGA Tour, in a deal that extended through 2021. In conjunction with the tour, Web.com hosts "summits", or designated spaces for people to meet company representatives and learn about its offerings; Web.com hosted 27 of these events in 2013. Financial News & Daily Record reported that the company had 500 employees in Jacksonville, plus an additional 1,400 in satellite offices, in October 2012. By 2014, Web.com had 2,000 employees in the U.S., Canada, the United Kingdom, and Argentina.

Web.com's customer service center in Drums, Pennsylvania opened in January 2016. The company opened a digital customer service center in New Glasgow's Aberdeen Business Centre, in September 2016. The office became Web.com's third call center in Nova Scotia; the company also has offices in Halifax and Yarmouth. Web.com generated $710.5 million in revenue in 2016, an increase from $543.5 million in 2015.

In March 2017, the International Customer Management Institute named Web.com a finalist in the "Best Large Contact Center" category at its annual Global Contact Center Awards, which recognize "companies and individuals that honor leadership, vision, innovation and strategic accomplishments within the customer service industry." In May 2017, the company relocated 175 employees within Scottsdale, Arizona's SkySong development into the SkySong 4 building. Yodle, which was acquired by Web.com in 2016, had moved into SkySong in 2009. The new SkySong 4 office space will house administrative and sales operations. The company was reportedly approached by private equity firms about a possible buyout in 2017.

On April 24, 2025, Web.com announced its merger with Network Solutions, adopting the latter's brand name. This move is part of Newfold Digital's strategy to consolidate its brands, including merging iPage, HostMonster, and FatCow into Bluehost, its primary web hosting brand.

== Acquisitions ==
In recent years, Web.com has grown via acquisitions. In 2023, it merged with ipage. The company acquired Solid Cactus, a provider of e-commerce and other online solutions, in 2009. Web.com acquired Register.com in 2010 for $135 million, resulting in an 80 percent increase in revenue and a four-fold increase in the number of customers. The company's offices in Drums were formerly occupied by Network Solutions, a domain registration company acquired by Web.com in 2011 for $405 million and 18 million stock shares. The acquisition increased Web.com's customer base to 3 million people, the number of domains under its management in 9 million, and the number of employees to nearly 2,000. Web.com executives rang the closing bell at the NASDAQ MarketSite on February 28, 2012, to commemorate the company's acquisition of Network Solutions. Web.com acquired SnapNames, an "expired"{cn} domain name service and marketplace, and has a 50 percent partnership with Rightside in NameJet. The company acquired Scoot.com, the largest online business directory network in the United Kingdom, in July 2014. In 2016, Web.com purchased Rightside's domain name drop list registrar accreditations for $1.3 million, and acquired the New York-based marketing services firm Yodle for more than $300 million. The purchase marked Web.com's largest acquisition by volume to date, with 1,400 employees. In December 2016, the company expanded into Latin America by agreeing to acquire the Argentina-based Donweb.com for $8 million. The deal was completed in February 2017. On November 14, 2019, Web.com closed its acquisition of Dreamscape Networks Limited.

Web.com has partnered with other companies to enhance its offerings to customers. In 2009, Web.com partnered with Chase Paymentech to provide payment processing services, as well as First Data to offer e-commerce, online marketing, and payment processing solutions to businesses. In 2014, MasterCard and Web.com partnered to feature the former's Simplify Commerce solution, which launched in 2013, as a preferred payment provider. According to the National Federation of Independent Business, Sam's Club partnered with Web.com in 2015 to offer online marketing services to small business owners. In February 2017, Domain Name Wire reported that Web.com gave away 375,000 .xyz domains to its customers, as part of an agreement with the top-level domain's registry, which received an advertising credit worth $3 million.

On June 21, 2018, Web.com announced an agreement to be acquired by an affiliate of Siris Capital Group, LLC. The agreement was for $25.00 per share in an all cash deal valued at approximately $2 billion. On August 6, 2018, Web.com announced an amended agreement to be acquired by an affiliate of Siris Capital Group, LLC for a revised amount of $28.00 per share in Cash and at the end of the "Go Shop" period.

Web.com merged with Endurance Web Presence to form a new company named Newfold Digital in 2021. Newfold Digital is a joint venture between Clearlake Capital, owner of Endurance Web Presences since 2021 and Siris Capital Group. In January 2019, Sharon Rowlands was named CEO.
