= IPage =

Web hosting company

iPage
- Company type: Private company
- Industry: Web hosting
- Founded: 1998
- Founder: Tomas Gorny
- Headquarters: Tempe, Arizona, USA
- Area served: Worldwide
- Owner: Endurance International Group
- Parent: Endurance International Group
- Website: https://www.ipage.com/

iPage (/ˈaɪpeɪdʒ/) is a web hosting company that has transitioned to become a part of Network Solutions as of December 11th 2025.

== History ==
iPage was initially founded in 1998 as a full web service provider, but the company re-launched operations as a web hosting provider in 2009. It's currently owned by Endurance International Group. In 2023 it merged with web.com. iPage hosts currently more than one million websites in its two large data centers. However, iPage faces criticism for its speed, uptime, and customer support.

== Features ==
iPage offers several types of hosting. Some of them are:

- Shared hosting: That enables users to host unlimited domains for a monthly fee. Features offered by iPage are similar to other unlimited shared hosting services and include unlimited disk storage, data transfers, email addresses, FTP accounts, addon domain names, free SSL, and MySQL databases.
- Virtual private servers determining the RAM, CPU, disk space and bandwidth specifications including cPanel.
- Dedicated Servers
- WordPress hosting: Which is only to host websites that use WordPress but with addon services such as expert support in WordPress.
