= Clement Mok =

Graphic designer and author

- Born: Clement Mok; 1958 (age 67–68); Vancouver, British Columbia, Canada
- Known for: Graphic design
- Awards: AIGA Medal (2008), National Design Award (2023)

Clement Mok (born 1958) is a graphic designer and author. He is best known for his work on marketing materials for the original Macintosh computer while creative director at Apple Inc.

Mok founded several design-related businesses — Studio Archetype (acquired by Sapient), CMCD and NetObjects, Inc. In 1997, Mok recruited George Chen in a photoshoot for an early collection of stock photography made for graphic designers distributed on CD-ROM, whose likeness was used in many high-profile print and billboard advertising campaigns, inadvertently creating an unofficial mascot for the dot-com era, nicknamed "The Internet Guy". From 1998 until 2001, he was Chief Creative Officer of Sapient. Mok also served as the national president of AIGA.

Mok was the art director, creative director, and ultimately the head of Creative Services department at Apple Inc. in the 1980s. He joined the company in late 1982, working directly under Steve Jobs. His work included user manuals and communication design for Macintosh 128k, the original Macintosh computer, and Apple IIc. After Steve Jobs' departure in 1985, Mok led the development of the education market for Apple and is credited with helping Macintosh achieve higher popularity within the graphic designer community. He left Apple in 1988 to establish his studio that he named Clement Mok designs.

Currently, he leads a new subscription-based royalty-free stock image business and consults on a variety of product development projects.

Mok was awarded the 2008 AIGA Medal and the 2023 Cooper Hewitt National Design Award for his accomplishments in digital design.

Mok graduated from ArtCenter College of Design in 1980 with a Bachelor's degree in graphic design. He began his career working for CBS and design agency Donovan & Green in New York.

== Information architecture ==
Mok authored an influential early information architecture manual, Designing Business (Adobe Press, June 1996).

== See also ==
- List of AIGA medalists
