= Hosting =

Hosting may refer to:

- To act as the organizer or master of ceremonies for an event
- Self-hosting (compilers), software distribution which provides all necessary source code to enable itself to be re-compiled from scratch
- Internet hosting service, including:
  - Web hosting service, service that makes the website accessible via the World Wide Web
  - Shared web hosting service, web hosting service where many websites reside on one webserver
  - Software as a service, model in which software is licensed on a subscription basis and is centrally hosted
  - Virtual private server or virtual dedicated server – model in which the client receives part of the computing resources of a physical server. One physical server can host several dedicated servers.
  - Dedicated hosting service, Internet hosting in which the client leases an entire server
  - One-click hosting

== See also ==
- Host (disambiguation)
- Hosted desktop
- Hosted Exchange
- Hosted payload
- Internet hosting service
