= Host =

A host is a person responsible for guests at an event or for providing hospitality during it.

Host may also refer to:

== Places ==
- Host, Pennsylvania, a village in Berks County
- Host Island, in the Wilhelm Archipelago, Antarctica

== People ==
- Jim Host (born 1937), American businessman
- Michel Host (1942–2021), French writer
- "Host", an author abbreviation in botany for Nicolaus Thomas Host

== Arts, entertainment, and media ==
=== Fictional entities ===
- Hosts (World of Darkness), fictional characters in game Werewolf: The Forsaken
- Hosts, alien invaders and overlords in the TV series Colony
- Avenging Host, a group of characters in Marvel Comics' Earth X series of comic books
- Rutan Host, fictional aliens from Doctor Who

=== Literature ===
- Host, the third novel in the Rogue Mage series by Faith Hunter
- Host, a 1993 book by Peter James
- Hosts (novel), a 2001 book written by American author F. Paul Wilson

=== Music ===
- H.O.S.T., an Azerbaijani hip-hop group
- Host (Critters Buggin album), 1996
- Host (Paradise Lost album), 1999
- Host (Cults album), 2020
- "Host", a song from the b-side of the 1999 single "Cave" by Muse

=== Other art and media ===
- Host (film), a 2020 horror film directed by Rob Savage
- Hosts (film), a 2020 horror film directed by Adam Leader and Richard Oakes
- Host (painting), a 1996 painting by Ellen Gallagher

== Computing and technology ==
- Host (network), a computer participating in a computer network
  - hosts (file), mapping hostnames to IP addresses
  - host (Unix), a command
  - Hostname
  - Internet hosting service
  - Virtual host, hosting multiple domain names on a single server
- In hardware virtualization a host machine runs a virtual machine
- UOL HOST, a webhosting service

== Groups or formations ==
- Cossack host, military formations of Eastern Europe
- Hueste, or host, a type of military force in the Iberian Peninsula and France during the Middle Ages
- Furious Host or the Wild Hunt, a European folk myth

== Religion ==
- Heavenly host, an "army" of good angels in Heaven
- Lord of hosts, a common epithet of the God of the Old Testament
- Sacramental bread, called the host or hostia, used in Christian liturgy

== Roles ==
- Host (radio), the presenter or announcer on a radio show
- Television presenter, the host or announcer on a television show
- Casino host
- Host, a paid male companion at a host club offering conversation and entertainment, primarily in East Asia
- Maître d'hôtel (Maître d') or head waiter of a restaurant or hotel
- Master of ceremonies
- Talk show host, a presenter of a TV or radio talk show

== Science ==
- Host (biology), an organism harboring another organism or organisms on or in itself
- Host (psychology), personality as emphasized in treating dissociative identity disorder
- Host (astronomy), the interactions and analysis of a star-planet relationship

== See also ==
- Hostess (disambiguation)
- Hosting (disambiguation)
- The Host (disambiguation)
