= GlowHost =

American web hosting provider

GlowHost.com, LLC
- Native name: GlowHost.com, LLC
- Type: Limited Liability Company
- Industry: Web Hosting
- Founded: 2002
- Founder: Matt Lundstrom
- Headquarters: Stuart, Florida, USA
- Area served: Worldwide
- Products: Web Services, Web Hosting, Domain Name
- Website: GlowHost.com

GlowHost.com, LLC. is a privately held web hosting company headquartered in the United States of America and is currently registered in the State of Florida providing shared, reseller, virtual private server, dedicated web hosting and domain name registration services.

== Company history ==
The company was founded in Crested Butte, Colorado, by Matt Lundstrom in 2002. GlowHost is a trademark registered with the United States Patent and Trademark Office. This trademark was first used in commerce on April 1, 2002. Later, on April 16, 2009, an application for the trademark was submitted to the USPTO, which was published for opposition on September 1, 2009. Finally, the trademark was registered on November 17, 2009. GlowHost is accredited by the Better Business Bureau and has maintained an A+ rating since October 21, 2015.

== Press ==
GlowHost, a leader in web hosting services from shared hosting to dedicated clusters, announced its recognition by SourceForge as a Top Performer for Spring 2025 for its achievement in the top 10% of over 100,000 products featured on its comparison site. SourceForge is the world's largest B2B software review and comparison website with nearly 20 million in-market B2B software buyers per month.

Website Planet interviewed GlowHost CEO Matt Lundstrom in 2023 regarding tips to choose a web host.

GlowHost CEO Matt Lundstrom was the first $5,000 investor in a $35,000 Kickstarter project aimed at providing absolutely free Drupal training. The donation provided the funds for 50 videos that were created to help users learn Drupal 8.

GlowHost introduces Cloud hosting technology for small and medium-sized businesses, geared to replace dedicated servers.

Webhostdir.com interviewed founder and President Matt Lundstrom in 2011. The article is available on their site.

In 2010, GlowHost sponsored The Annual Web Hosting Awards at hostreview.com and placed 3rd for the best VPS Hosting service.

According to a press release from April 15, 2009, GlowHost acquired DataCities.com, a rival web hosting company.
