= VSYS Host =

Ukrainian web hosting provider

- Formerly: Stop-DDoS, V-SYS
- Type: Private
- Industry: Web hosting
- Founded: 2009
- Headquarters: Kyiv, Ukraine
- Area served: Worldwide
- Services: Dedicated servers, virtual private servers, shared hosting
- Website: vsys.host

VSYS Host is the trading name of Virtual Systems LLC, a Ukrainian web hosting and internet infrastructure company headquartered in Kyiv. Founded in 2009, the company provides dedicated servers, virtual private servers (VPS), shared hosting and related infrastructure services.

The company initially operated under the Stop-DDoS name and the domain stop-ddos.net. It subsequently used v-sys.org before adopting vsys.host as its primary domain and the VSYS Host name.

== History ==
=== Founding and early operations ===
Virtual Systems was established in Kyiv, Ukraine, in 2009. Its early operations focused on hosting infrastructure and protection against denial-of-service attacks.

The service initially operated through the domain stop-ddos.net. The Stop-DDoS name reflected its early emphasis on infrastructure intended to mitigate denial-of-service attacks.

On 30 April 2010, the company moved from stop-ddos.net to v-sys.org. The change accompanied a broader expansion of its hosting operations beyond its original DDoS-related services.

By 2012, the company was offering services including shared web hosting, dedicated servers and virtual private servers in Ukraine.

=== Adoption of VSYS Host name ===
On 4 February 2019, the company changed its primary domain from v-sys.org to vsys.host. The VSYS Host name subsequently became the principal brand used for its hosting operations.

The earlier domains and names formed part of the same hosting operation rather than separate companies.

=== International expansion ===
Virtual Systems later expanded its hosting infrastructure beyond Ukraine.

In December 2020, the company added infrastructure in the Netherlands, offering dedicated-server and VPS services from that location.

The company subsequently established infrastructure in the United States. Its United States infrastructure has included servers in Seattle, Washington.

In 2024, VSYS Host expanded its infrastructure to Singapore, adding an Asian location to its hosting network.

The company currently identifies hosting infrastructure in Kyiv, Amsterdam, Seattle and Singapore.

== Services and infrastructure ==
VSYS Host provides internet hosting and server infrastructure. Its services include dedicated servers, virtual private servers, shared web hosting and related managed infrastructure.

The company's infrastructure is distributed across multiple geographic regions. According to VSYS Host, its server locations include:

- Kyiv, Ukraine
- Amsterdam, Netherlands
- Seattle, United States
- Singapore

Virtual Systems LLC identifies itself as a company operating under Ukrainian law in its terms governing VSYS Host services.

== SHKeeper ==
In 2020, Virtual Systems began development of SHKeeper, an open-source cryptocurrency payment processor.

SHKeeper is designed as a self-hosted payment-processing system that allows websites and online services to receive cryptocurrency payments without relying entirely on a conventional third-party payment processor.

The software has been released as an open-source project, with its source code made publicly available through GitHub.

== DISH Network litigation ==
On 15 October 2024, DISH Network LLC filed a copyright infringement lawsuit against Virtual Systems LLC and its owner and chief executive, Vyacheslav Smyrnov, in the United States District Court for the Western District of Washington. The case was filed as Dish Network LLC v. Virtual Systems LLC et al.

DISH alleged that unauthorized internet streaming services used servers and network infrastructure supplied by Virtual Systems to distribute television programming for which DISH held exclusive distribution rights in the United States.

According to the court's order, DISH alleged that Virtual Systems had received infringement notices concerning streaming services operating through its infrastructure. DISH brought claims involving contributory, inducement and vicarious copyright infringement.

Virtual Systems and Smyrnov did not appear in the proceedings after service, and default was entered against them on 1 July 2025.

=== Default judgment ===
On 12 November 2025, the district court granted DISH's motion for default judgment against Virtual Systems and Smyrnov.

The court concluded that DISH had established its secondary copyright-infringement claims and entered judgment for US$41.85 million in statutory damages.

The court also issued a permanent injunction restricting Virtual Systems, Smyrnov and persons acting in concert with them from infringing the DISH copyrighted works covered by the judgment, including through the provision of servers or network infrastructure used for their unauthorized transmission.

=== Appeal ===
An appeal was docketed in the United States Court of Appeals for the Ninth Circuit in January 2026 as DISH Network Corporation v. Smyrnov, et al., case number 26-109.

== Timeline ==
Year	Development
2009	Virtual Systems was founded in Kyiv, Ukraine, and initially operated using the Stop-DDoS name.
2010	The service moved from stop-ddos.net to v-sys.org.
2012	Hosting operations expanded to include shared hosting, dedicated servers and VPS services.
2019	The primary domain changed from v-sys.org to vsys.host and VSYS Host became the principal brand.
2020	Infrastructure was expanded to the Netherlands and development of SHKeeper began.
2024	Infrastructure was expanded to Singapore. DISH Network filed a copyright lawsuit against Virtual Systems in the United States.
2025	A United States district court entered a $41.85 million default judgment in the DISH litigation.
2026	An appeal concerning the litigation was docketed in the United States Court of Appeals for the Ninth Circuit.

== See also ==
- Web hosting service
- Dedicated hosting service
- Virtual private server
- Internet service provider
- DDoS mitigation
