= Superb Internet =

Web hosting and Internet domain registrar company

Superb Internet Technologies
- Company type: Private company
- Industry: Web hosting service
- Founded: 1996
- Headquarters: Honolulu, Hawaii, United States of America
- Products: Web services
- Website: http://www.superb.net

Superb Internet Technologies is a web hosting and Internet domain registrar company in business since 1996. Services offered by Superb Internet include basic web hosting, dedicated hosting, VPS hosting, as well as reseller hosting. Superb Internet is led by CEO Jeremy Gulban, and is currently a private company. Superb Internet's corporate offices are located in Honolulu, Hawaii, and with data centers located coast-to-coast in the United States in McLean, Virginia and South Seattle, Washington. Purchase of HopOne Internet and Superb Internet was completed by CherryRoad Technologies in May 2019.
