= Watery Ecstatic =

Painting by Ellen Gallagher

- Artist: Ellen Gallagher
- Year: 2003
- Medium: Watercolor, pencil and cut paper
- Dimensions: 56.5 cm × 76.2 cm (22.2 in × 30.0 in)
- Location: Saint Louis Art Museum, St. Louis

Watery Ecstatic is a 2003 painting by Ellen Gallagher. It is in the collection of the Saint Louis Art Museum in St. Louis, Missouri.

== Description ==
An octopus-like sea creature is painted in watercolor and pencil on a piece of cut paper. The creature stretches across the proper right side of the paper. The painting is signed on the verso: "Ellen Gallagher 2002".

== Background ==
The painting is a part of a series, titled Water Ecstatic Series, which Gallagher describes as being a type of scrimshaw.

== History ==
The painting was purchased by the Saint Louis Art Museum on May 23, 2003, from the artist via Gagosian Gallery in New York City. Funding to purchase the painting came from the Henry L. and Natalie Edison Freund Charitable Trust. Watery Ecstatic was featured in a solo exhibition about Gallagher at the Saint Louis Art Museum, titled Currents 88: Ellen Gallagher, in 2003. The work also toured Europe as part of another solo show of Gallagher's work, "Ellen Gallagher: AxME," which visited the Sara Hildén Art Museum, Tate Modern, and Haus der Kunst.
