= Hybrid server =

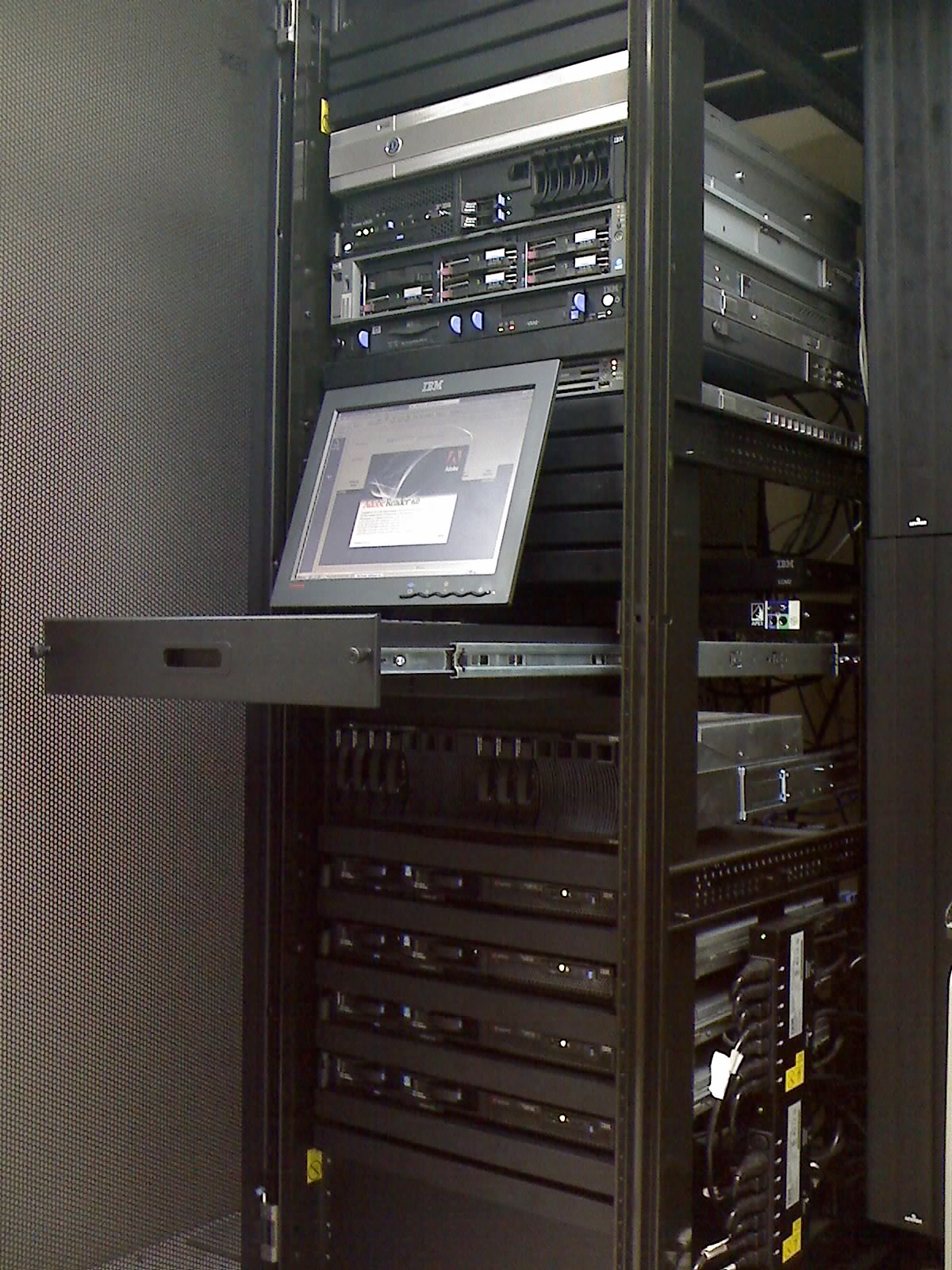
A typical server "rack".

A hybrid hosting service or hybrid server is a type of Internet hosting which is a combination of a physically-hosted server with virtualization technology. By 2018, it is estimated to hold the largest market size in the hosting segment.

== Overview ==
A hybrid server is a new kind of virtual server that offers both the power of a classic dedicated server and the flexibility of cloud computing. On hybrid servers hardware is shared between users. The price is lower than for dedicated servers. It is offered at a flat-rate cost that is based on various financing mechanisms such as capital expenditure with straight-line depreciation from purchase price to residual value and leased or financed option.

The server is separated into hybrid server environments using Red Hat KVM or any other virtualization. Each hybrid environment is securely isolated and has guaranteed resources available to it which ensures a high level of performance and responsiveness. A hybrid server combines all of the benefits of virtualization technology with the performance of a full dedicated server. So, an administrator can use automation to suspend, restart, or reinstall the operating system. One large server is split into a few (normally two) Hybrid servers. The benefits of this platform also include access through a single point of contact; sharing the network infrastructure; and monitoring, delivering, and managing hosting services.

A specific deployment of a hybrid server involves an Exchange Server that communicates with Office 365 for mail routing and integration of free/busy information.

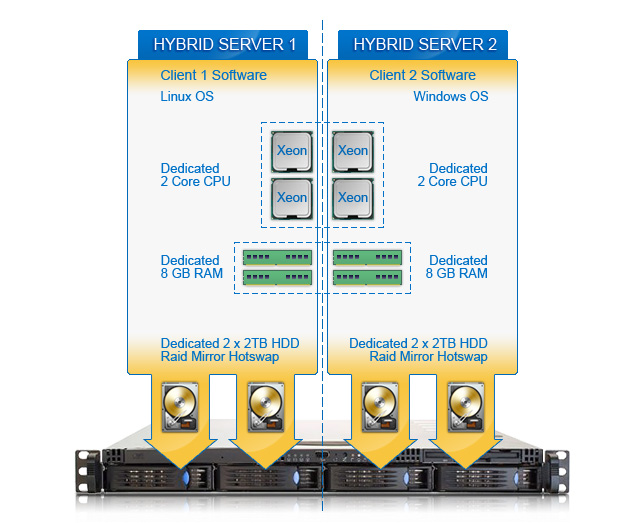
Hybrid server visualisation

== See also ==
- Dedicated server
- Virtual private server
