= Delirious Hem =

1995 painting by Ellen Gallagher

- Artist: Ellen Gallagher
- Year: 1995
- Medium: Graphite and colored pencil on papers, mounted on canvas
- Dimensions: 213.4 cm × 183.5 cm (84.0 in × 72.2 in)
- Location: Metropolitan Museum of Art, New York City

Delirious Hem is a 1995 painting by Ellen Gallagher. It is in the collection of the Metropolitan Museum of Art (the Met) in New York, New York in the United States.

== Description ==
A part of Gallagher's first major body of work, Delirious Hem comprises pieces of paper glued to a canvas with five penmanship paper sets glued on top. Dispersed around the canvas are numerous groups of tiny human lips that represent minstrel shows and the stereotypes they perpetuate about African Americans. Gallagher has signed the back of the piece, on the backboard. The inscription reads: "Ellen Gallagher 1995".

== History ==
This painting debuted at Gallapher's seminal solo exhibition at the Mary Boone Gallery in New York City in 1996. It was then sold to Norman Dubrow in 1996, who in turn donated it to the museum in 2010. Since acquiring it, the piece has traveled internationally for the Tate Modern curated exhibition "Ellen Gallagher: AxME." It traveled to the Tate in 2013, the Sara Hildén Art Museum in 2013–14, and the Haus der Kunst in 2014.
