= Green hosting =

Internet hosting which attempts reduction of environmental impact

Green hosting or eco-friendly hosting is Internet hosting that involves strategies to reduce the environmental impact of their activities. These may include the increased use of renewable energy, planting trees, plants, and grass around and over data centers, and more day-to-day activities such as energy conservation and the use of energy-saving appliances.

Green hosting may also utilize green marketing to ease consumer concerns, and carbon offsetting, the purchasing of green certificates to offset carbon emissions. A deceitful web hosting service may participate in greenwashing where the eco-friendly marketing term does not reflect reality.

== Take up ==
Adoption of green hosting was initially very slow in the early 2000s, largely because the hosting companies who were providing these services initially were doing so at premium prices. There was also limited awareness regarding green hosting among customers and how it helped the environment. Today, though, the market has changed, with many hosting companies offering green services across the globe. While still limited, consumer awareness is also increasing over time. A survey of 1,000 internet users in the United States in 2024 showed that 28% say they would definitely support businesses with strong environmental practices, while 35.4% of shoppers said they would be more likely to purchase from sustainable websites.

World Internet usage statistics show that internet usage is still rapidly growing in the U.S., with 97.1% of individuals reported to be using the internet by 2022, and 67% of the global population (5.4b people) online by 2023. The International Energy Agency noted in 2023 that data centres are estimated to have consumed 1-1.3% of global final electricity demand, excluding cryptocurrency mining - while also being responsible for 1% of energy-related C02 emissions. The Lawrence Berkeley National Laboratory 2024 United States Data Center Energy Usage Report found that 4.4% of electricity in the US is being consumed by data centres, a number that is expected to rise to 6.7-12% by 2028. As the adoption of artificial intelligence (AI) increases and the number of data centres worldwide continues to grow, understanding the environmental impact of AI has become an important area of study in the context of digital infrastructure and sustainability.

While green hosts do not and cannot have zero impact on the environment and zero C02 output, they work to reduce and minimise their impact significantly by utilising different techniques in order to offset it.

== Green hosting strategies ==
A green organization does not necessarily have to have access to green power from wind, water, or solar energy, they can also purchase green certificates to offset the use and cost of conventional energy. Hosting sites that contain Green-e certification labels are organizations that voluntarily adhere to strict environmental guidelines. Other recognized certificates that regularly used in the web hosting industry include The Gold Standard, Green Power Partnership, VCS (Verified Carbon Standard), and Climate Action Reserve.

== See also ==
- Green computing
- Internet hosting
- Web hosting service
- Clustered web hosting
