= List of Change 123 characters =

The following is a list of characters from the manga series Change 123.

== Main characters ==
Motoko Gettou (月斗 素子, Gettou Motoko)
Voiced by: Misato Fukuen (Drama CD)
The protagonist of the series, Motoko was adopted by three combat specialists after the death of her mother. Her "fathers" trained her in karate, swordsmanship, submission techniques, close quarters combat and the handling of firearms. As a result of the excessive physical and mental strain placed on young Motoko during her training, she developed three split-personalities, collectively known as "HiFuMi", as well as one called "Zero", who represents all her pent up rage. HiFuMi works to protect Motoko, and though she sees HiFuMi as a burden to her, wishing only to live a normal life, she knows they are just trying to look after her safety. Though Motoko could be a powerful combatant even without HiFuMi, her shy and passive nature often restricts her from making use of her fighting capacity. Though normal characters do not notice when she changes personalities, the subtle changes in Motoko's "Ki" occurs whenever a different personality takes control, which could be perceived by other sufficiently-skilled fighters. MRI scans done by Kannami have confirmed that Motoko's muscle structure is indeed very impressive.
Though initially wary, Motoko develops feelings for Kosukegawa and eventually starts dating him. One of her fathers unknowingly arranges for her to be married to Kosukegawa, but she turns the offer down as she wishes to fuse with Zero and HiFuMi before even considering marriage. Later, it is revealed that Motoko may not be the original personality, but merely a "host" personality, implying that the real Motoko might actually be Zero. The identity known as "Motoko" may have been constructed in order to handle everyday life while perceiving herself to be the true identity. At the end of the series, however, she is able to fuse with HiFuMi and return to a normal life with Kosukegawa. They later get married and in a final twist of fate have three daughters, who look like Hibiki, Fujiko and Mikiri.

HiFuMi

"Hibiki", "Fujiko", and "Mikiri" (literally meaning "1 - 2 - 3") is a representation of Motoko's three personalities. They appear whenever Motoko experiences strong emotions, is in danger, or faints. In some cases, HiFuMi is capable of emerging simply when one of the personalities wants to get out. The three personalities are in constant communication with each other, but cannot communicate with Motoko. To solve this Motoko keeps a diary in which they can all write feelings and suggestions so Motoko can gain a better understanding of each personality and vice versa. The three of them are essentially representations of Motoko's "fathers". Each with their own specialty and characteristics. It is explained that each has their own physical characteristics set apart from the rest because of variant changes in muscle tones in the face and bodies they look similar, but not the same. Each physically represent a different physical build due to the unique training of each style. To further tell them apart each has a different hair style pertaining to them, as well as they seemed to be different hair colors, though it is not explained how that happens. They each develop their own unique a bond with Teruharu Kosukegawa. currently, because of Motoko's disappearance after remembering how her mother died, HiFuMi have taken up the duty of being Motoko while at school. However, in Volume 11 after they challenge both Hino and Ginga to an all out battle of 3 against 2, HiFuMi easily wins. They are shortly afterward caught by Kosukegawa and a teacher. Kosukegawa quickly thinks up an excuse for their fighting and apologizes on their behalf. Believing that they have caused Kosukegawa more than enough trouble, they decide to leave, possibly taking their Grandmother's offer, though states she would return soon.
- Hibiki (ひびき) Voiced by: Yuu Asakawa (Drama CD) is an aggressive tomboy who is particularly skilled in karate and is represented by Red (attack). Her hair flows freely and equal and she is always looking for or instigating fights. Through her father's training she has always been known to take a head-on approach with anything, be it training (instead of dodging a log booby trap she instead chooses to punch through it), getting Kosukegawa to admit his feelings to Motoko (by kissing him and changing into her so he would finally kiss her), and even with her own feelings (as she kisses Kosukegawa for his birthday present, then stated she would give him something more for his next birthday), even fused with Zero she doesn't dodge attacks. Hibiki has deep feelings of love for Kosukegawa and admires how he is able to step forward though his fear when he must. To which she used as inspiration to give her 100% and conquer her own fears during a deadly battle. It is common for her to 'apologize' to Kosukegawa with a kiss or by offering herself to him. She finds the idea of being married, having a family and always being with Kosukegawa to be like a dream. She even goes so far as to even call him "darling". Hibiki is also shown of trying to encourage a sexual relationship with Kosukegawa. Be it giving hints of giving him "something more" for his next birthday or hoping he would jump on Mokoto after she comforted him. She even confirmed that she was planning to have sex with Kosukegawa for his birthday, but refrained from it since Motoko was anxious enough to faint from "only a kiss". Hibiki even shows jealousy when Kosukegawa is with Ginga or Izuru, to which she describes herself as though feeling her "head spinning" and her "heart pounding" whenever she sees him with them. Once after she lost a fight to Ginga in front of Kosukegawa she was so embarrassed to show her face to him that she didn't reveal herself for two months. Out of the three personalities, she is the most common to appear. She has the ability to 'stay out' from morning to night since she is the one most eager to jump into a fight. Hibiki is the first to kiss Kosukegawa and second to receive a date with him. When Hibiki witnessed Sora throwing Kosukegawa's cherished collection of Kamen Raider videos away, a ploy by Sora to have HiFuMi reveal the power of "black", she was overcome with rage. This triggers her first merger with Zero, and as a result of this merger she nearly kills Sora before Kosukegawa eventually intervened. In fact he was also nearly killed, when Hibki attempting to strangle him with the scarf HiFuMi and Motoko made for him for his birthday. It was only after realizing that she was not protecting Kosukegawa from crying, but was in fact the one making him cry, that Hibiki was finally able to take control over Zero. After the disappearance of Motoko, true to her head-on approach tries to bring her back by having a no holds brawl against Hino and Ginga. However, after defeating them realized even their level of fighting wasn't enough.
- Fujiko (ふじこ) Voiced by: Chie Horikoshi (Drama CD) is calm — almost to the point of appearing cold-blooded — and proficient in the use of weapons and represented by Blue (speed); indeed, she is the quickest of the four personalities, outside Zero herself. She is also the most mature and adult-like of the three personalities; hence, she is also the most analytical, almost to the point of being strategic. She doesn't seem to care for food that isn't nutritious in any way, but now has a liking for ice-cream because of Kosukegawa. Because of her marksman skills, she is a natural at video games, but tends to use a lot of ammo in shooting games as she was trained to shoot the head and the heart. She is shown to be stronger than Hibiki, whereas Hibiki lost to Ginga, Fujiko easily defeats Hino, who is the current Gadam, and therefore much stronger than Ginga. Though she states to Hino that she doesn't believe she is in love with Kouskegawa, she admits that she is fond of him, and that he is a very dear person to her. Some of her actions however point to Fujiko having very deep feelings for Kosukegawa. For example when she first meets Hino, she challenges her to see if she is strong enough to protect him. Also after seeing Kosukegawa stabbed and apparently mortally wounded by an American soldier, Fujiko was so enraged by the thought of losing him that she willfully fuses with Zero in order to avenge him and nearly kills the soldier by systematically shooting him in painful and non-lethal spots in order to prolong his pain before she kills him. But before she finishes him off she realizes that she truly does not wish to go against Kosukegawa's way of life. She manages to restrain Zero and spare the soldiers life as she clutches her precious blue topaz necklace Kosukegawa gave to her for her birthday. However moments later she learns that Kosukegawa's 'blood' was actually from a bottled vegetable drink that protected him from actually being harmed. She became very embarrassed to have gone so far over "spilt juice" and revealing so much of her feelings, which she usually keeps guarded. She is talented in homemaking skills, as she is a good cook to the point of near-perfection. Hibiki and Mikiri comically state she once melted a pot while preparing curry over the course of three days when only one night was required. As well, Hibiki stated that on the scarf they all made for Kouskegawa that the "professional" looking parts were done by Fujiko. Also, after Motoko's disappearance, both Mikiri and Hibiki have her do all the house work, for which they were chided by Kosukegawa. After controlling zero we learn what she truly wishes for is a life of her own.
- Mikiri (みきり) Voiced by: Hiromi Konno (Drama CD) is the child-like expert in grappling and submission moves and represented by Yellow (defense). All Mikiri wants is to play like other children, although like a child, she can easily be scared into fainting and possesses child-like cruelty, showing excitement at the prospect of scratching and clawing a man's eyes out. A constant gag with Mikiri is that when she takes control, her body form changes (described by Motoko as a change in her muscle placement), inevitably increasing her bust size and causing anything less than a shirt (bra, bikini, etc.) to rip apart. She has a very large appetite, able to eat all 31 flavors of ice cream in a single sitting. Of the three personalities, she appears least often but, has the most active social life. 'Playing' with the neighborhood kids visiting "Granny". Has more of a child-like attraction towards Kosukegawa. Calling him Kosuke-niichan. Stating that she would miss playing with him if he was killed and wanted to take a bath with him on his birthday, upset at the fact that he fell asleep before she came out. When she was comforting Kosukegawa stating "You should always be who you are because that's why we (HiFuMi) love you so much". Mikiri would often visit an elderly neighbor of Motoko's whom she referred to as Granny, as the elderly woman would often make her ohagi to eat (an amount Motoko herself couldn't stomach). In chapter 41 Granny died, leaving one last batch of ohagi that Mikiri vowed to finish. When this batch of ohagi was dropped and ruined by would-be muggers, an enraged Mikiri fused with Zero to exact revenge, only to be brought back to her senses by the fact that she would have crushed Granny's ohagi if she had continued fighting. However, true to her child-like nature, Mikiri, joined by Kosukegawa, ate the ohagi off of the street, forcing the muggers to do the same.
- Zero (ゼロ) is the most dangerous of all her personalities and represented by Black (a mixture of all three colors). She is ruthless, emotionless (evident by the permanently vapid look on her eyes as she attacks), inhumanly strong to point of being able to tear off limbs, endure direct attacks without flinching she uses her forehead (even completely ignoring an opponent's hold that would have broken her arm), and will attack almost anyone she sees with intent to kill. She has all the skills of the other personalities as well as the capacity to utilize them with alarming coordination but she has no mercy for anyone, not even for Kuruma Takezou, one of the "Three Fathers" or Teruharu, taking Motoko and HiFuMi to hold her back from killing him, where when she first came out even as a little girl two of the "Three Fathers" were terrified to approach her even after she had passed out after 3 minutes She has all the traits of a natural born killer. Despite being by far the most powerful of Motoko's personalities, she has two condition that must be met before she can take over: 1) each of the three personalities that make up HiFuMi must be defeated before she comes to the surface, making her somewhat of a last resort for Motoko, and for HiFuMi to go through extreme anger. Such as seeing Kosukegawa being hurt severely. How she was named Zero was because that was the only word she has ever said, appearing to be a reference as HiFuMi means 1, 2 and 3, so when she is called out is like counting down (3, 2, 1, 0). However, if one of HiFuMi is experiencing extreme rage, Zero is able to fuse with them, giving them a strong boost of power but driving them into a controlled killing frenzy. As a side note, unlike HiFuMi, and Motoko, her breasts are the smallest, resembling more of a child-like body, a trait that has carried over to the members of HiFuMi she has fused with—as Fujiko and Mikiri fused with Zero, their physiques changed in turn to more closely resemble Zero's. Currently HiFuMi, Motoko, Two of the Three Fathers, Kosukegawa and Kannami are working on a way to remove Zero, who is essentially the hatred and rage of all of the personalities by having HiFuMi experience the joys of a normal life. It is also theorized by Kannami to Mokoto that she could fragment a new personality if she does not go through with the therapy.
Teruharu "Hideo" Kosukegawa (小介川 英生, Kosukegawa Teruharu)
Voiced by: Junji Majima (Drama CD)
Motoko's classmate who is a fan of Kamen Raider (仮面レッダー, Kamen Reddā; Masked Redder) (a pun on Shotaro Ishinomori's Kamen Rider) and looks to emulate the hero. He takes an instant liking to Motoko and goes to great lengths to protect Motoko's secret. Because of Kosukegawa's loyalty and self-sacrifice, HiFuMi feels some affection towards him. Since he knows of Motoko's situation, Kosukegawa serves as HiFuMi's liaison. He has admitted that he cares for all four of Motoko, but even to Hibiki's suggestion that he kiss her he turns her down as he first fell in love with first Motoko and, wants to confess to her first. He is uncommonly durable able to withstand painful injuries like being knocked into a river by a swinging log of wood without permanent injuries. He is shown to be a natural fighter. Stated by Ralph he has image training pat down. Where with only a few tips (and acupuncture to increase his strength and speed and a Kamen Raider suit as armor) he was able to briefly hold his own against Zero earning only a broken arm where trained assassins were nearly killed. He was advised to defeat her with a punch to the throat (the effectiveness of which remains unknown given HiFuMi's superhuman durability), but stopped himself as he couldn't bring himself to harm Motoko. As of the end of volume five, Kosukegawa, and Motoko begin to go out, but does not have the courage to hold hands, or any other close activity with her, yet has finally and happily been able to call her by her first name. This does not stop Kosukegawa from having perverted fantasies about her, to the point of saying "Where do you want to do it" instead of "Where do you want to go," and gives off a perverted aura. It is shown that Kosukegawa gave Kannami, his childhood friend, an alloy version Kamen Raider Z-III because of the benefit the two would gain from having, and losing the figure. Though he is completely for the idea of marrying Motoko, more often than not his reasons behind so is because of all the perverted things they could do after. However, after realizing that Motoko could only be a Host personality, he became greatly depressed at the idea that if she was to fuse with Zero she would lose all memories of their time together. These thoughts seem to have dispelled after Motoko comforted him. His greatest fear is realized in Chapter 49 of volume 10. When, after Hibiki merges with Zero in order to exact revenge on Sora for her mistreatment of Kosukegawa, Motoko finally remembers her last memory of her mother before she died. Her last words to her mother before she is killed in her accident are " You can just die mother!" This terrible recollection cause Motoko to suddenly disappear without warning. He asks HiFuMi every chance he gets if she has return, but after Hibiki tearfully tells him they do not know what to do, he is taken aback by his insensitivity. Hugging Hibiki, he apologizes realizing that he isn't the only person feeling lonely and helpless. Later when he discovers HiFuMi has disappeared, he doesn't hesitate to immediately set off on a journey to discover their whereabouts. With a clue from Kannami, he sets off for Kyoto the place where her family is rumored to have been acting as highly sought after covert spies for generations. He could watch the final battle between the HiFuMi infused Zero against Tatsuya in order to find Motoko inside of them. They later get married and in a final twist of fate have three daughters, who look like Hibiki, Fujiko and Mikiri.

== Motoko's family ==
Takezou Kuruma (車 岳蔵, Kuruma Takezou)
Nicknamed "The God of Submission", Takezou specializes in submission holds and grappling techniques. It is Kuruma's training that created the personality of Mikiri. He is a "good-natured" man that cares very deeply for his daughter's well-being. Kuruma prefers to grapple his opponents either until submission or until knocking them unconscious (usually by cutting off circulation to the brain or by attacking the brain directly in attempt to shake it, which would result in instant unconsciousness). He also appears to have a liking to the Kamen Raider series, wearing a festival mask when first introduced. He is able to tell which of the four personalities his "daughter" is at any given time, which surprises Motoko. He is known to train any students who wish to learn his style of fighting, though he claims none have ever been able to complete their training besides a Russian woman, Anna, who he usually calls Anna-chan. He is shown to have a liking for Anna and sometimes uses his training with her for his own perversions, usually to comical effect. Kuruma is the most common of the Three Fathers to appear, even staying at Motoko's house for Christmas.
Jin Hayase (早瀬 仁, Hayase Jin)
Nicknamed "Sword Saint", Jin is another one of Motoko's "fathers". He specializes in strategic combat and tactical weaponry. He is a master swordsman and regarded by many as a tactical genius. Hardly anything is known about his personal life other than that he used to be a special ops in the military. He is usually seen resting his sword against his shoulder and is also responsible for creating Fujiko. He aided Kanami in attempt to help fuse Zero with HiFuMi in hopes of eliminating Zero. He sees Zero as a threat to Motoko's safety. Like Fujiko he is hardly ever shown to reveal emotion, though he does care for Motoko. Stating what father does not wish for their daughters happiness.
Tatsuya Rukawa (流河 竜也, Rukawa Tatsuya)
Nicknamed "Tiger Killer Ryu", Tatsuya is the third "father" of Motoko to be revealed, he appeared only in flashbacks until volume eight. He is mainly a wanderer and is described the karate master that "defeated a tiger with his bare hands". He is also responsible for the creation of Hibiki. He is a specialist in empty-handed combat and known throughout the underworld as an 'untouchable' having taken vengeance on a number of gangs, mob bosses and professional fighters for slighting him. Like Hibiki, if there's a fight to be had he's always anxious to join in and has even been known to instigate fights, despite any odds. Ironically, it appears that outside of fighting he is actually a very nice person frequently seen with a pleasant grin on his face. Hibiki states that after sparring with him none of HiFuMi are able to move the next day, likewise, the other two fathers believe that he could fight Zero to the death as a draw, this arguably makes him the strongest out of the three fathers. Tatsuya is mainly responsible for arranging Motoko's engagement to Kosukegawa after he befriended Kosukegawa's father in hopes once she is married he may be free to wander. He is the only one of the "Three Fathers" that does not know about Zero, as the other two fathers believe he will try to draw her out intentionally for a fight to the death. It is noted that it has been two years since Motoko has even seen Tatsuya. On a comical note, the other two fathers think he is a moron. Contrary to their beliefs, he has revealed he is very smart, but only when it comes to fighting and when it involves his daughter. To comical effect, he can tell Hibiki apart even though she was pretending to be Motoko. He refers to Motoko and HiFuMi as his daughters and Kosukegawa as his son-in-law. Of the "Three Fathers", he is the least involved in Motoko's life, though ironically he's her registered guardian. He is actually Motoko's biological father although she also has genetic connections to the other two as well. He squares off against Hifumi in their attempt to awaken Motoko, knocking all three unconscious.
Asagi Gettou (月斗 浅葱, Gettou Asagi)
Motoko's mother who died in an accident when Motoko was very young. She was a great information retrieval expert but when she had Motoko she gave it all up and got a reputable job to take care of her. She met Kuruma, Jin and Rukawa when she was on assignment, working with them even though she would betray them once she got the info she needed. It is revealed in Chapter 49 that she was killed when a truck tipped over, causing the steel beams it was carrying to fall on her right in front of her daughter, inadvertently creating Zero. When Jin mentions meeting her, she resembles Hibiki the most but later in life her facial appearance was the same as the combination of Motoko and HiFuMi after the fight between Zero and Teruharu. Tatsuya Rukawa is Motoko's real father but she keep this info from the Gettou family, to keep their job a secret, is a fatherless society. It is implied that all three fathers still love her despite the fact she was the enemy.
Sakura Gettou (月斗 桜, Gettou Sakura)
First revealed in chapter 41, Sakura is Motoko's grandmother. Not much is known other than she looks very young for her age and is the mother to Motoko's biological mother Asagi. She employs many highly skilled martial artists. First was Botan to watch her granddaughter, then sent Kisaragi to watch over her, where Sora is only there for her own interest after hearing that there was a possessor of Black. She wants for Motoko to come live with her at the Gettou estate and work in the family business, which is similar to a ninja as they hide in the shadows and keep the peace in secret. However, to become a member Motoko would need to split off all ties with everyone she knows now, giving her a year to decide if she wants to or not. In the end, Motoko decided to remain outside after she fuses with HiFuMi.

== Kosukegawa family ==
Kosukegawa's Mom
An oddly shaped woman who lives with her son as her husband works overseas. For some reason she appears to have a lack of interest towards her son, where when she first met Mokoto she stated her son had died, then when Ginga stated she was going back to her island she offered the idea for her son to leave so she could stay. Though she does love her husband, running to greet him in volume 8 after not seeing him for a long time.
Kosukegawa's Dad
Usually working overseas, Kosukegawa's father isn't seen till volume 8 when he tells his son that he found him a fiancée. He (like his son) is a good hearted man who will risk his own safety to save someone who seems to be in danger (which is how he met Rukawa Tatsuya). He believed that his son was more into the Kamen Rider series to be interested in girls, which is why he set up the fiancée, but he is proud of his son and how he is able to solve a problem without resorting to violence.
Ginga (ギンガ)
A fourteen-year-old female Gada warrior of the Gigi Tribe, from the Solomon Islands. She possesses the Ten Fangs, the highest level among the Gada, directly below the village protector, 'Gadam'. She seems to be as strong as HiFuMi individually. She is currently living as a boarder in Kosukegawa's house as he first believed she was a he and he didn't want "him" to stay at Motoko's house. She has a large unknown bird of prey named Gyoutenmaru who she and Hino saved when they first met. Ginga is later shown to be Kosukegawa's relative, through his great grandfather who disappeared in World War II, much to his surprise, where since then she has lived with the Kosukegawa family and goes to high school. Though she is a girl, she doesn't like the fact that she is growing breasts, believing they just get in the way during a fight. But later, Mikiri informs her that her father Kuruma states that fat absorbs attacks better than muscle, which could explain why her breasts grow so large. She is also terrified of flying. She is usually seen hanging out with Aizawa. She defeated Sora's master but she was attacked in the neck by Sumire. In the end, she along with Hino and Gyoutenmaru watched Kosukegawa and the injured Motoko and Tatsuya return.

== Others ==
Kannami (神無弥)
Another of Motoko's classmates and Kosukegawa's childhood friend, although the two are not as close as before. This is probably because of Kannami moving away to America two years after they met, therefore weakening their friendship. However, there are times, such as in chapter thirty-one, that Kannami enjoys being friends with Kosukegawa. Kannami enjoyed spending time with Kosukegawa because Kosukegawa was always able to see the possibilities in the most mundane places. Kannami is also very popular with the female student body, including Motoko. He is interested in HiFuMi, to the point where he pushed Motoko off the school's roof just so he could witness her transformation and hired professional fighters to bring out Zero. He is a prodigy and wanted by DARPA. Motoko (and Mikiri) seem to be enamored by him, causing Kosukegawa to get jealous. It is shown in chapter thirty-one that Kannamni accepted a Kamen Raider action figure from Kosukegawa because it would help him remember Kosukegawa since he was not fond of Kamen Raider at all. He warns Motoko that she could fragment a new personality if she doesn't go through with the therapy. And later, believes that Motoko is actually a "host" personality and not the real Motoko.
Ralph Anderson
A young American Navy soldier current rank: Colonel. He is as big (if not bigger) fan of the Kamen Rider series like Kosukegawa. Because of an incident his father was killed lost his left arm. Kosukegawa and Motoko first meet him on a train where he recognized the Kamen Raider key chain Kosukegawa had. After he ate 5 bowls of rice. Before they parted ways Ralph gave Kosukegawa's watch (1st time). It is later discovered that Kannami hired him to help bring out Zero under the commands of Jin. He is a skilled strategist and has a prosthetic left arm, replacing the one he lost.
Anna
A Russian woman currently being trained by Kuruma Takezou, one of the Three Fathers, though she also trained with Jin Hayase, another of the Three Fathers. She has the ability to memorize any attack after seeing it, but her weakness is that she lacks the skill to use it properly without proper training. Though Kuruma sometimes acts perverted around her, they both seem to harbor feelings for each other. She once teased Motoko by asking how she would feel if she was to get a "new brother, sister, or a foreign mother". She is shown to be a good cook of Russian style food, as she often prepares borscht.
Botan Tsukishima (月島 牡丹, Tsukishima Botan)
A new transfer student to Saotome High School. Her dark skin and the reason for transferring (father's work) implied her as the most likely person to be 'Gadam', but in the end, it is shown to be Hino. She's tall, athletic, very popular with the other female students, and obsessed with discovering Motoko's secret. She dislikes her uncommon appearance, preferring not to stand out to the point where she is mistaken as a guy to some at first glance. After an incident where Kosukegawa protected her from a viper, it appears that she has started to grow feelings for him, even stating she wouldn't mind having his child. In chapter 37 she leaves without telling anyone so to not leave any attachments, but not before giving Kosukegawa her VHS/DVD player to replace his that she accidentally destroyed, her leaving her past behind being a condition she needed to fulfill to become a member of the Gettou family. She appears to have some connection with Motoko's grandmother as she states that Motoko with her separate personalities have achieved the three colors of martial arts, Red (Hibiki) for attack, Blue (Fujiko) for speed and Yellow (Mikiri) for defense. With this she has mixed all of them, achieving Black (Zero). Sora refers to her as nearly Red level; however from her tone she may be insulting her. She later returns to try to prevent Sora from unleashing Zero although she is stopped by an unknowing Kosukegawa. Eventually she is told by Sumire Kisaragi that she earned the right to call herself Red, having been able to break down the wall called laws.
Izuru Hino (日野 いずる, Hino Izuru)
Ginga's childhood friend on the island of the Gada. She came to the Gada Island because of her father's work as a map maker, creating maps so the people were able to get around the island safer. Although Hino became Gadam, and decided to wait for Ginga to challenge her, Hino eventually had to leave for Japan, effectively angering Ginga. Endowed, and beautiful, Hino is easily seen as a princess, and her personality is equivalent to her looks, as well as her fighting style; however, having been brought up by the Gada, Hino is prone to prepare rather bizarre cuisines, from hunting live animals to devouring them raw. She appears to be perceptive enough to at least know whenever a different personality (so far it's Fujiko) overrides Motoko's body, leaving the actual Motoko dormant, as seen during the times when Fujiko surfaced. Hino likes to avoid causing unnecessary pain, and therefore attacks the jaw to paralyze her opponents by using Aikido in battle and has fast reflexes. Hino is shown to be the Gadam of the Gada, though she no longer lives there it is still very dear to her and believes that she owes more to the Gada then she could repay in her lifetime. Surprisingly, she shares an interest in Kamen Rider, much to Kosukegawa's delight, and watches the series with him from time to time. However, it worries Motoko that he might like Hino more than her. After observing her skills in battle, Fujuko became interested in recruiting her as a means to keep Zero at bay should the dangerous personality re-surfaces once again, but knowing she couldn't just ask for assistance from a total stranger, she approached Hino in the guise of Motoko to briefly challenge her. Despite the whole fight being just a test, Fujiko proved to be the one victorious and it was then that Hino realized (as Fujiko pointed out) that her ability to perceive her surroundings from outside of her field of vision is not as honed as those on the front and sides (evident as Fujiko was able to snatch the ribbon tying Hino's hair after swiftly running past her, and it was only when Hino's har fell did she realized it), she even contemplated that she would have totally lost had Fujiko taken the fight seriously. Tsukishima comments on her talent to easily do things quickly just after being told, such as learning to read her opponent's rhythm. Sora deduces that she is a Light Brown martial artist (Yellow + Light Red + Light Blue). She defeats a member of the Gettou Family, but is attacked by Sumire, and sent by her to Tokyo but in Nagoya, she returned to retrieve Ginga and in the end, she along Gyoutenmaru and Ginga saw Kosukegawa with the injured Tatsuya and the returning Motoko.
Naoko Watanabe(直子渡辺 | Watanabe Naoko)
Daughter of a friend of Kosukegawa's father.
Aizawa (相沢)
Aizawa was at first a punk attending school just to beat up the strongest one there. As he searched he met Ginga, who during this time believed he wanted to beat up the strongest to attain a title called "Guardian", which appears to be a term used for the protector of the school. After watching a fight between Mikiri and Ginga, he realized he is nowhere near as strong as he once believed. He is still very competitive when it comes to his fighting skills however, especially when it comes to Ginga, who often goads him into fighting. Though he seems not to really associate with anyone else at school as often as he does with Ginga, he often corrects others when they refer to them as being "close friends", instead stating profusely that they are only "classmates" and nothing more. When he feels that she's beginning to surpass him after their return to school after summer, he goes to Hino to help him train in Aikido. Though he hated the title of "Guardian" at first, he starts to embrace it during a fight that breaks out at a school festival and he stands up to the punks to protect the school.
Sumire Kisaragi (如月 菫, Kisaragi Sumire)
The new nurse at Saotome High School for the rest of the semester. Most of the male students find her very attractive. She works for Motoko's grandmother and is there to keep her eyes on Motoko, even going as far as to nearly kill Sora for attacking her, despite them both working for the Gettou Family. She has some memories of Motoko's mother back when she was a little girl. She finally reveals she is a representative of Sakura Gettou to Motoko after Hibiki's fight with Sora, informing her that she could live her life without any persecution if she joined the Gettou family. However, informed her she must sever all ties with everyone she is close to do so, and gave her a year to make her decision. She alters the memory of the intruders of the family and she attacks them in the neck with a taser. She was attacked by behind by Botan Tsukishima and Sumire before losing consciousness, she tells Botan that she achieve the Red Level.
Sora Uzuki (卯月 そら, Uzuki Sora)
Another person who works for Motoko's grandmother. Her main weapon seems to be a key chain with razor-sharp keys connected to a wire, which she uses like a rope dart. Not much else is known about her other than the fact she doesn't know who the possessor of Black looks like and challenges Hino. After the fight and assuming Botan was wrong, she sets her sights on Motoko as she has the same family name as the Head. Sora can be ruthless when it comes to getting what she wants, going as far as to hire a biker gang (offering them either money or even her own body) to attack the school. Later she even takes advantage of Kosukegawa kind nature to get to Motoko, as she figured out that he seems to be able to make her change personalities, making sure to kiss him right when she showed up and throwing away Kosukegawa's prized Kamen Raider video collection, which Motoko and HiFuMi knew he cherished very much. However, she is nearly killed by a Zero infused Hibiki because of this. She mentions she has a brother in kindergarten when watching Motoko and Kosukegawa's date. She states she is a Green (Yellow+Blue) martial artist. However, for being a Green martial artists means she lacks any way of attacking, relying solely on her keys for offense, which makes her virtually defenseless when she is waiting for them to return to her. She appeared in the end, seesighting the Tokyo Tower.
