= Tally (painting) =

Painting by Ellen Gallagher

- Artist: Ellen Gallagher
- Year: 1994
- Medium: Oil, pencil and paper on canvas
- Dimensions: 84 cm × 72 cm (33 in × 28 in)
- Location: Museum of Fine Arts, Boston

Tally is a 1994 painting by Ellen Gallagher. It is in the collection of the Museum of Fine Arts, Boston in Boston, Massachusetts in the United States.

This painting is part of an early series that Gallagher created examining minstrel shows. Sheets of penmanship paper are adhered to a canvas. Neutral colored oil paint and blue pencil emphasizes the lines on, and color of, the paper. Lightly drawn symbols decorate the pieces of paper, including drawings of red lips and eyeballs which represent early stereotypes of African American peoples.

This painting was acquired by the Museum on December 14, 1994, from the Mario Diacono Gallery, which representing Gallagher. Funding for the purchase came from the Living New England Artist Purchase Fund.

== See also ==
- Untitled, another painting in the same series by Gallagher
