= Icon Credit Union =

State credit union in the United States

- Company type: Credit Union
- Industry: Financial services
- Founded: 1952
- Headquarters: Boise, Idaho, United States
- Number of locations: 7 branches
- Area served: Ada County, Idaho; Canyon County, Idaho; Union County, Oregon; Wallowa County, Oregon.
- Key people: Connie Miller, President and CEO
- Services: Savings; Checking; Consumer Loans; Mortgages; Credit cards; Investments; Online banking; Business Services
- Total assets: $260 mil US$
- Number of employees: 95+

Icon Credit Union was a state-chartered credit union headquartered in Boise, Idaho. Icon had seven branches between Boise, Nampa, Idaho and Meridian, Idaho, and La Grande, Oregon. Icon's governing agency is the Idaho Department of Finance. It was merged into Horizon Credit Union in 2020.

== History ==
Icon Credit Union began as Idahy Federal Credit Union in 1952 in Boise, Idaho. Icon (Idahy at the time) began as a credit union focused on a few state-based select employer groups (SEGs), including the Idaho Department of Highways, hence the name Idahy. From 1952 through the 1990s, Idahy grew from its initial deposit of $35 to more than $21 million in assets. In 2003, Sho-Pan-Hi Federal Credit Union merged into Idahy, giving the company a presence in Coeur d'Alene, Idaho. Two years later, the Boise Cascade Federal Credit Union also merged into Idahy, increasing Idahy's field of membership to include employees of Boise Cascade and Boise, Inc.

In 2008, Idahy's members voted to approve a change to an Idaho State Charter, significantly increasing Idahy's field of membership outside of its select employer groups. This meant Idahy could accept membership from individuals who live or work in Ada County, Idaho, Canyon County, Idaho and Union County, Oregon, as well as employees of its existing select employer groups.

In 2010, Idahy's board of directors voted to change the credit union's name to Icon Credit Union to allow the organization's name to better reflect the new, diverse field of membership. At this time, Icon's membership stood at just under 15,000 members and Icon had more than $135 million in total deposits, making it the 9th largest credit union in the State of Idaho. Later, in 2013, the Northeast Oregon Federal Credit Union merged into Icon, further expanding its field of membership to include residents of Wallowa County, Oregon.

In 2019, Icon's board of directors voted to recommend Icon merge with Horizon Credit Union. Icon members overwhelming supported the Icon / Horizon merger and on August 1, 2020 Icon Credit Union officially merged into Horizon Credit Union. Prior to the merger, both Icon and Horizon were both ranked in the 2020 Top 200 Credit Unions (Horizon #48 /Icon #59).

== Ratings and reviews ==
Icon had an A+ rating with the Better Business Bureau. Icon also maintained an A rating with the Weiss Ratings and was the highest rated credit union in the State of Idaho.

== Membership ==
Icon's field of membership included those who reside or work in Ada and Canyon Counties in Idaho and Union and Wallowa Counties in Oregon, employees of the Idaho Transportation Department, Boise Cascade and Boise, Inc. Family members of those who meet membership criteria are also eligible, regardless of their place of residence.

== Governance ==
Icon Credit Union was governed by elected board of directors. Connie Miller as the president and chief executive officer (CEO), John Cotner as chief lending officer, Jeff Vogt as chief financial officer, Michelle Wall as vice president of support services, Kim LaFong as vice president of member service, and Robert King as chief information officer.
