= Company.com =

American online service company, 2009–2024

Company.com, LLC
- Type: Private
- Industry: Internet hosting service
- Founded: 2009
- Founder: Bill Wade
- Defunct: 2024
- Fate: Unknown
- Headquarters: Atlanta, Georgia, United States
- Key people: Bill Wade (Founder and CEO)
- Products: Websites, email, tech support, job postings, small business insurance, business listing
- Website: company.com

Company.com was an American online company that provided digital services and resources to business owners.

Services provided by Company.com included websites, email, tech support, job postings, small business insurance, business listing reports, team collaboration, equipment protection plans. payment processing, directory listings, business listing managers, hiring, and business funding.

As of June 2025, the website company.com was for sale, with a message on the website saying "Company.com is available for Acquisition. We are accepting serious, bonafide offers only".

== History ==
The company was founded in 2009 and was based in Atlanta, Georgia.

In 2015, the company was ranked the tenth on the Inc. 5000, which is a list of the 5,000 fastest growing private companies in the United States. In 2016, they were ranked fifth on the Inc. 5000.
