= Valmor Products =

Cosmetics company for African-American consumers

- Industry: Cosmetics and personal care
- Founded: 1926
- Headquarters: Chicago, United States

Valmor Products was a Chicago-based cosmetics and personal care company founded in 1926, targeted at African-American consumers. The company was known for its distinctive artwork used in its advertisements.

== History ==
Valmor was founded in 1926 as Valmor Products Co. by husband and wife team Rose and Morton Neumann. Morton Neumann (1898–1985) was a Jewish Hungarian-American chemist from Chicago. He created Valmor when he realized that there was an untapped market for African-American-focused cosmetics. Valmor products had several sub-brands including Lucky Brown, Madam Jones, King Novelty, and Famous Products Co. The company was based on the South Side of Chicago throughout its history, selling perfumes, hair pomades, incense, and other beauty products. The Neumanns ran Valmor until the company closed in 1984.

== Design and imagery ==
Valmor was known for its stylized packaging and advertisements featuring illustrations and photographs of African-American models. Notable artists who illustrated for early Valmor product labels and ads were Charles C. Dawson and Jay Jackson. The Chicago Cultural Center created a retrospective of Jackson and Dawson's work for Valmor in 2015, entitled "Love For Sale: The Graphic Art of Valmor Products".

Valmor advertising images of wig styles for sale were used in the album cover for the Rolling Stones' album Some Girls, and in artist Ellen Gallagher's "DeLuxe" series.
