= Paper Cup (painting) =

Painting by Ellen Gallagher

Paper Cups
- Artist: Ellen Gallagher
- Year: 1996
- Medium: Ink on paper on canvas
- Location: Tate Modern, London

Paper Cup is a 1996 painting by Ellen Gallagher. It is in the collection of the Tate Modern in London, England in the United Kingdom.

== Description ==
This painting represents one of the many works in Gallagher's first major body of work she created in the 1990s. A large scale painting, this work comprises 12 rows of penmanship paper, totaling 84 pieces of paper, glued to the canvas, while the canvas was wet, creating a bubbled, wrinkled appearance. On the paper, Gallagher used blue ink to create small lips, which represent stereotypes of African-Americans.

== History ==
Paper Cup was acquired in partnership with the National Galleries of Scotland in 2008. Funding for the acquisition was provided by The d'Offay Donation with assistance from the National Heritage Memorial Fund and the Art Fund. Artist Chantal Joffe named Paper Cups one of her top 10 favorite paintings located in London in 2014.
