= Internet hosting service =

Service that runs Internet servers connected to the Internet

An Internet hosting service is a service that runs servers connected to the Internet, allowing organizations and individuals to serve content or host services connected to the Internet.

A common kind of hosting is web hosting. Most hosting providers offer a combination of services – e-mail hosting, website hosting, and database hosting, for example. DNS hosting service, another type of service usually provided by hosting providers, is often bundled with domain name registration.

Dedicated server hosts provide a server, usually housed in a datacenter and connected to the Internet where clients can run anything they want (including web servers and other servers). The hosting provider ensures that the servers have Internet connections with good upstream bandwidth and reliable power sources.

Another common form of hosting service is shared hosting, where the hosting provider provisions hosting services for multiple clients on one physical server and shares the resources between the clients. Virtualization is necessary to make it work effectively.

== Types of hosting service ==
=== Full-featured hosting services ===
Full-featured hosting services include:

- Complex managed hosting applies to both physical dedicated servers and virtual servers, with many companies choosing a hybrid (a combination of physical and virtual) hosting solution. There are many similarities between standard and complex managed hosting, but the key difference is the level of administrative and engineering support that the customer pays for, owing to both the increased size and complexity of the infrastructure deployment. The provider steps in to take over most of the management, including security, memory, storage, and IT support. The service is primarily proactive.
- Dedicated hosting service, also called managed hosting service, where the hosting service provider owns and manages the machine, leasing full control to the client. Management of the server can include monitoring to ensure the server continues to work effectively, backup services, installation of security patches, and various levels of technical support.
- Virtual private server, in which virtualization technology is employed to allow multiple logical servers to run on a single physical server
- Colocation facilities provide just the Internet connection, uninterruptible power, and climate control, but let the client do his system administration.
- Cloud hosting, which can also be termed time-share or on-demand hosting, in which the user only pays for the system time and space used, and capacity can be quickly scaled up or down as computing requirements change. The hosting provider normally charges for the power and also the space used in the data center.

=== Other ===
Limited or application-specific hosting services include:

- File hosting service
- Web hosting service
- E-mail hosting service
- DNS hosting service
- Game servers
- Wiki farms
- Colocation center

== Bandwidth cost ==
Internet hosting services include the required Internet connection; they may charge a flat rate per month or charge per bandwidth used – a common payment plan is to sell a predetermined amount of bandwidth and charge for any 'overage' (Usage above the predetermined limit) the customer may incur on a per GB (Gigabyte) basis. The overage charge would be agreed upon at the start of the contract.

== Patent dispute ==
Web hosting technology has been causing some controversy, as Web.com claims that it holds patent rights to some common hosting technologies, including the use of a web-based control panel to manage the hosting service, with its 19 patents. In addition, Web.com sued GoDaddy as well for similar patent infringement.

== See also ==
- Internet service provider
- Application service provider
- Hosted service provider
- Utility computing
- Green hosting
- Cloud storage
- Hybrid server
- Infrastructure as a service
- Bulletproof hosting
