= Untitled (1999 painting by Ellen Gallagher) =

1999 painting by Ellen Gallagher

- Artist: Ellen Gallagher
- Year: 1999
- Medium: Enamel, rubber, and paper on canvas
- Dimensions: 305 cm × 244 cm (120 in × 96 in)
- Location: Art Institute of Chicago

Untitled is a 1999 painting by Ellen Gallagher. It is in the collection of the Art Institute of Chicago in Chicago, Illinois in the United States.

Keeping in the tradition of Gallagher's large-scale paintings, Untitled consists of black rubber which is texturized with paper on canvas. On the lower right of the painting, Gallagher used enamel and rubber to depict an African person, that she describes as a "fantasy." The viewer sees the back of the African person's head, with a mohawk hairstyle, tattoos and piercings.

The painting was acquired by the Art Institute of Chicago in 2004.
