= Afro Mountain =

1994 painting by Ellen Gallagher

- Artist: Ellen Gallagher
- Year: 1994
- Medium: Ink and collaged paper on canvas
- Dimensions: 213.7 cm × 183.5 cm (84.1 in × 72.2 in)
- Location: Whitney Museum of American Art; New York City

Afro Mountain is a 1994 painting by the American artist Ellen Gallagher. It is in the collection of the Whitney Museum of American Art in New York, New York in the United States.

== Description ==
The painting keeps with the tradition of Gallagher's works of the 1990s and is considered an example of minimalist abstract art. It comprises penmanship paper glued to a canvas with ink drawings of lips which overtake the entire bottom half of the large canvas.

== History ==
Afro Mountain was created by Gallagher in an empty print shop at Harvard University in 1994. The painting was a gift of an anonymous donor, in 1995, to the Whitney. Afro Mountain was exhibited at the Tate Modern's 2013 retrospective about Gallagher titled "Ellen Gallagher: AxME: Room 7." In 2010, the piece was included in the Whitney Biennial.
