= They Could Still Serve =

Painting by Ellen Gallagher

- Artist: Ellen Gallagher
- Year: 2001
- Medium: Pigment and synthetic polymer on paper mounted on canvas
- Dimensions: 304.8 cm × 243.8 cm (120.0 in × 96.0 in)
- Location: Museum of Modern Art; New York City

They Could Still Serve is a 2001 painting by Ellen Gallagher. It is in the collection of the Museum of Modern Art (MoMA) in New York, New York in the United States. They Could Still Serve represents Gallagher's biggest focused body of work: large scale pieces that explore racial stereotypes of African Americans, specifically those seen in minstrel shows.

== Description ==
Penmanship paper is glued on a canvas with tiny googly eyeballs drawn throughout the piece, primarily on the lines of the penmanship paper.

== History ==
This painting was acquired in 2001 by using funds from Emily and Jerry Spiegel and Anna Marie and Robert F. Shapiro Funds and gift of Agnes Gund. They Could Still Serve has been exhibited in numerous group shows as MoMA. In 2007, it was included in Comic Abstraction: Image-Breaking, Image-Making because of the cartoonish style of the eyeballs. In 2008, the piece was in Multiplex: Directions in Art, 1970 to Now and in 2010-2011's On Line: Drawing Through the Twentieth Century.

== Insight about the work ==
The name, They Could Still Serve, comes from an etching in The Disasters of War series by Francisco de Goya.
