= Teeth Tracks =

Painting by Ellen Gallagher

- Artist: Ellen Gallagher
- Year: 1996
- Medium: Oil, pencil and paper mounted on canvas
- Dimensions: 162.56 cm × 142.24 cm (64.00 in × 56.00 in)
- Location: The Broad, Los Angeles

Teeth Tracks is a 1996 painting by Ellen Gallagher. It is in the collection of The Broad in Los Angeles in the United States.

The painting is a series of multi-colored oil and pencil drawings of what appear to be teeth marks or teeth charts from a dental office or laboratory. Each image is drawn on a piece of paper which is then adhered to a canvas.

The painting was acquired by The Broad on November 7, 1996. The painting was featured in the exhibition Creature held at The Broad from November 5 to March 19 2016.
