= Host (painting) =

Painting by Ellen Gallagher

- Artist: Ellen Gallagher
- Year: 1996
- Medium: Oil and graphite on paper mounted to canvas
- Dimensions: 175.58 cm × 126.68 cm (69.13 in × 49.87 in)
- Location: Seattle Art Museum; Seattle

Host is a 1996 painting by Ellen Gallagher. It is in the collection of the Seattle Art Museum in Seattle, Washington in the United States.

== Description ==
Keeping in the tradition of Gallagher's early works, the painting comprises sheets of penmanship paper, painted with a light, beige oil paint, glued to a canvas with thousands of tiny lips and eyes drawn in graphite. The eyes look like googly eyes and the lips are large, banana-like in shape and exaggerated similar to the make-up worn by white actors in minstrel shows.

== History ==
This painting was acquired by the museum with gifts from Richard and Elizabeth Hedreen and the Margaret E. Fuller Purchase Fund. Host was first exhibited at the American Academy of Arts and Letters' "Invitational Exhibition of Painting and Sculpture" in 2000 in New York City. It was exhibited four times at the Seattle Art Museum as part of various group exhibitions. It was also exhibited in New York at the New Museum as part of Gallagher's solo show, "Ellen Gallagher: Don't Axe Me" in 2013.

== Background ==
This is one of many in a collection of works by Gallagher that reflects on early African-American stereotypes, particularly those depicted in minstrel shows. This, among other similar paintings by the artist, have been described as being deceptively part of the minimalism movement, until the viewer sees the details mouths and eyes.

== See also ==
- Doll's Eyes - a painting by Gallagher with a similar theme
