= Untitled (1996 painting by Ellen Gallagher) =

1996 painting by Ellen Gallagher

- Artist: Ellen Gallagher
- Year: 1996
- Medium: Oil, ink and paper mounted on canvas
- Dimensions: 213.36 cm × 183.83 cm (84.00 in × 72.37 in)
- Location: The Broad, Los Angeles

Untitled is a 1996 painting by Ellen Gallagher. It is in the collection of The Broad in Los Angeles, California in the United States.

This large scale abstract, contemporary painting consists of beige paper mounted on canvas. A stroke of indigo blue paint is on the top of the painting, stopping 1/3 through. A series of blue ink squares, filled with lines, resides on a large portion of the canvas. This painting was acquired by The Broad on January 31, 1997.
