= Charles C. Dawson =

African American artist

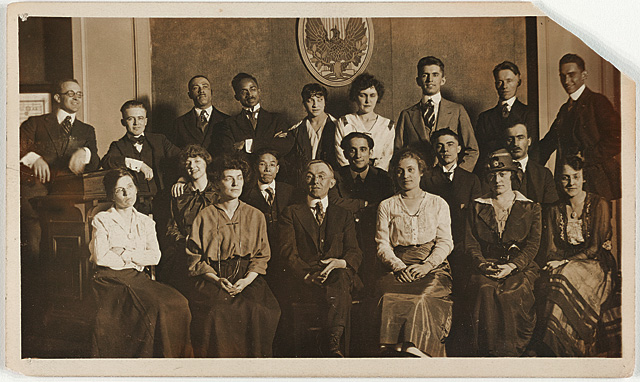
- Charles Dawson (back row, fourth from left) and class at the School of the Art Institute of Chicago, c. 1916.
- Born: Charles Clarence Dawson; June 12, 1889; Brunswick, Georgia
- Died: 1981 (aged 91–92); New Hope, Pennsylvania
- Education: Tuskegee Institute, Alabama The Art Students League of New York, New York School of the Art Institute of Chicago, Illinois

Charles C. Dawson (June 12, 1889 – 1981) was an American painter, printmaker, illustrator, and graphic designer.

== Life and education ==
Dawson was born in Georgia in 1889. He studied art at the Tuskegee Institute in Alabama from 1905 to 1907, then moved to New York City to attend the Art Students League, where he was the first black student. Disturbed by the racism he encountered at the Art Students League, Dawson left to attend the School of the Art Institute of Chicago, having saved money working as a pullman porter and as a waiter in an art and literary club called the Cliff Dwellers Club. There, he is said to have come into contact with members the club including Frank Lloyd Wright, James Henry Breasted, Henry Ossawa Tanner, and Oliver Dennett Grover.

After graduating from the School of the Art Institute of Chicago, Dawson enlisted in the army and was sent to France as one of the Buffalo Soldiers. He served from 1917 to 1919 and returned to Chicago after the war.

== Artistic career ==
Charles C. Dawson wrote an unpublished autobiography titled "Touching the Fringes of Greatness." In this autobiographical work, Dawson discusses his experiences as a student at the Tuskegee Institute, the Art Students League of New York, and the School of the Art Institute of Chicago, as well as his artistic career and pursuits.

Dawson participated in two Works Progress Administration programs. From 1936 to 1941 Dawson was Director of Arts and Crafts and Co-Administrator of the City of Chicago Work and Training Program of the National Youth Administration of Illinois. In this role he designed the layout for the American Negro Exposition at the Chicago Coliseum in 1940, a piece composed of 20 dioramas showcasing African American history. These dioramas are now in the collection of the George Washington Carver Museum at Tuskegee Institute.

=== The "New Negro" movement in Chicago ===
The Negro in Art Week Exhibition was an active agent of Chicago's "New Negro" movement. Alain Locke hoped that the exhibition would showcase a "racial art" that expressed an individual identity for African Americans in both style and subject matter. Charles C. Dawson designed the cover of the 1927 catalog for the Negro in Art Week Exhibition. The cover included a full-length figurative representation of an Egyptian pharaoh as well as a West African sculpture juxtaposed with contemporary male and female figures in formal dress.

=== Exhibited artwork ===
In 1927, three paintings by Dawson were included in an exhibition of Modern Paintings and Sculpture hosted by the Chicago Art Institute as part of "The Negro in Art Week" in Chicago. As listed in the show's catalog, the three paintings were The Quadroon Madonna, Brother and Sister, and Searchlights. The exhibition ran from November 16 to December 1, 1927. Two commercial designs by Dawson were displayed in a related "Negro in Art Week" exhibition of Paintings, Drawings, and Applied Arts hosted by the Chicago Women's Club from November 16 to November 23 of that same year. These commercial designs include a design for a poster and a design for an insurance policy heading.

In 1940, Dawson exhibited a watercolor painting titled The Crisis in "The Art of the American Negro (1851 to 1940)," an exhibition held at the Tanner Art Galleries in conjunction with the historic American Negro Exposition in Chicago. That exhibition, which included work by a range of African American artists including Hale Woodruff, Jacob Lawrence, Lois Mailou Jones, Elizabeth Catlett, Richmond Barthe, and Charles White, was on view from July 4 to September 2, 1940.

=== Exhibition organizer ===
Charles C. Dawson worked not only to promote his own artwork but also worked to promote the work of his fellow African American artists by organizing and curating exhibitions of their work. In 1927, Dawson acted as the Chairman of the Subcommittee on Fine Arts for the Exhibition of Primitive African Sculpture, Modern Paintings, Sculpture and Drawings, Applied Arts and Books. In 1940, he was on the Western Jury of the Jury of Selections, identified as a painter from Chicago, for the Exhibition of the Art of the American Negro at the Tanner Art Galleries in Chicago, Illinois. For the same exhibition, he also served on the Jury on Awards and the National Committee on Art. Dawson also founded the collective the Arts and Letters Society and the Chicago Art League.

From 1940 to 1951, Dawson served as the curator of the Museum of Negro Art and Culture at Tuskegee University.

=== Published artwork ===
In 1933, Dawson published a children's book that he both wrote and illustrated, titled ABC's of Great Negroes. The book consists of 26 linoleum prints portraying major figures in black history. Each print is accompanied by a brief text describing major accomplishments and some biographical information on the depicted individual. Frederick Douglass, Dr. George W. Carver, and Meta Warrick Fuller are three notable African Americans included in the book. Some historical figures include Egyptian Pharaoh Khufu Cheops, Egyptian Princess Nefert, and Empress of Ethiopia Zaudita (Zewditu). Each print included in the text consists of a portrait, the individual's name, a title or accomplishment, and usually the letters "CCD" for "Charles C. Dawson".

=== Graphic designer ===
Dawson is known for his illustrated advertisements for beauty schools and products targeted to the black community, such as Annie Turnbo Malone's Poro College and Valmor Products. He began working for black entrepreneurs when he returned to Chicago after serving in World War I. Dawson's clients also included Anthony Overton and Jesse Binga, the magazine Reflexus and director Oscar Micheaux.

== Selected works/images ==
- O Sing a New Song, (lithograph), ca. 1933, The Metropolitan Museum of Art, New York, NY
- Page from ABC's of Great Negroes, 1933, (Dawson Publishers) featuring Booker T. Washington, Art Institute of Chicago
- Cover of The Negro in Art Week, 1927, November 16–23: Exhibition of Primitive African Sculpture, Modern Paintings, Sculpture and Drawing, Applied Art and Books, Chicago: Chicago Woman's Club (ex. cat.)

== Selected exhibitions ==
- 1927 Exhibition of Primitive African Sculpture, Modern Paintings, Sculpture and Drawings, Applied Arts and Books, Chicago Art Institute and Chicago Women's Club, Chicago
- 1940 Exhibition of the Art of the American Negro, Tanner Art Galleries, Chicago

== Selected collections ==
- Metropolitan Museum of Art, New York, New York
- DuSable Museum of African American History, Chicago, Illinois
