= Ellen Gallagher =

American painter (born 1965)

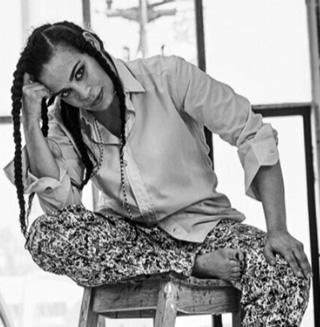
- Born: Ellen R. Gallagher; December 16, 1965 (age 60); Providence, Rhode Island, US
- Education: Oberlin College; Studio 70; School of the Museum of Fine Arts; Skowhegan School of Painting and Sculpture
- Known for: Painting; Mixed media
- Movement: Contemporary art

Ellen Gallagher's voice
from the BBC programme Front Row, May 1, 2013.

Ellen Gallagher (born December 16, 1965) is an American artist. Her work has been shown in numerous solo and group exhibitions and is held in the permanent collections of many major museums. Her media include painting, works on paper, film and video. Some of her pieces refer to issues of race, and may combine formality with racial stereotypes and depict "ordering principles" society imposes.

== Background and education ==
Gallagher was born on December 16, 1965, in Providence, Rhode Island. Referred to as African American, she is of biracial ethnicity; her father's heritage was from Cape Verde, in Western Africa (but he was born in the United States), and her mother's background was Caucasian Irish Catholic. Gallagher's mother was a working-class Irish-American and her father was a professional boxer.

In Rhode Island, Gallagher attended Moses Brown, an elite, Quaker college preparatory school. At sixteen, Gallagher entered her first year at Oberlin College in Ohio (1982–1984) and studied writing. Gallagher did not finish her education at Oberlin College and ended up joining a carpenters' union in Seattle. Before her art career, Gallagher worked as a commercial fisherman in Alaska and Maine. In 1989 she attended Studio 70 in Fort Thomas, Kentucky, before earning a degree in fine arts from the School of the Museum of Fine Arts in Boston in 1992. Her art education further continued in 1993 at the Skowhegan School of Painting and Sculpture in Maine.

== Career ==
Gallagher gained recognition as an artist in 1995. Prior to her Gagosian showing, Gallagher had solo shows at Mary Boone in Soho, New York, and Anthony D'Offay in London. As her first solo show in New York, Gallagher chose Mary Boone's space because of its neutrality, in which she stated, "because there the abstract qualities of my work stand out first".

== Work ==
Ellen Gallagher, Wiglette from DeLuxe 2004–2005

Gallagher is an abstract painter and multimedia artist creating minimalist work with subject narratives. Gallagher's influences include the paintings of Agnes Martin and the repetitive writings of Gertrude Stein. Some of Gallagher's work involves repetitively modifying advertising found in African American focused publications such as Ebony, Sepia, and Our World, including images from Valmor Products ads, as in her DeLuxe series. Her most famous pieces are her grid-like collages of magazines grouped together into larger pieces. Examples of these are eXelento (2004), Afrylic (2004), and DeLuxe (2005). The series DeLuxe showed multiple creative methods, from photogravure to digital printing. Gallagher used oils to combine different sheets together and add texture. Gallagher pushed the limit between two and three dimensions in her series. She used new technologies to create plates in many layers. Each of these works contains as many as or more than 60 prints employing techniques of photogravure, spit-bite, collage, cutting, scratching, silkscreen, offset lithography and hand-building. Gallagher also glues notebook paper drawings onto her canvas to create textured surfaces.

In her artwork, she combines different traits of three art movements. Two of them mentioned by her are Abstract expressionism and Minimalism., but by observing her use of specific materials like magazines, newspapers, etc. The use of patterns and repetition series as well as the many printing techniques she uses can relate to her work with Pop-art. With stylized allusions to cartoons and childhood toys or via transformed and manipulated advertisements Gallagher's work “seduces the viewer into visceral engagement with images about which we have learned to feel numb. Her work has been described as singular yet nuanced with these contrasting styles combined to bring life to otherwise static images.

Some of Gallagher's early influences while attending the School of the Museum of Fine Arts in Boston were the Darkroom Collective, a group of poets living and working out of Inman Square in Cambridge, MA and would go on to become the art coordinator of the collective. The Darkroom collective allowed Gallagher to explore her talent and apply her culture as an African-American woman to her work. One of her first exhibits took place at the Dark Room in 1989. Some other influences at the Museum School were Susan Denker, Ann Hamilton, Kiki Smith and Laylah Ali.

Themes related to race are often evident in Gallagher's work, sometimes using pictographs, symbols, codes and repetitions. "Sambo lips" and "bug eyes," references to the Black minstrel shows, are often scattered throughout Gallagher's works. Additionally, Gallagher would use these symbols in her collage pieces, inspired by lined yellow paper schoolchildren use. Certain characters are also used repeatedly, such as the image of the nurse or the "Pegleg" character that sometimes populate her page's iconography. Gallagher made Wiglette from Deluxe 2004 to 2005, which contains a collection of vintage beauty ads from the 1930s to 70s intended for black American women. Through this art piece Ellen Gallagher is once again exploring the intersection of identity, race and culture. When asked about Wiglette in an interview Gallagher said, “The wig ladies are fugitives. Conscripts from another time and place, liberated from the 'race' magazines of the past. But I transformed them-here on the pages that once held them captive.” Some of her pieces may explicitly reference the issue of race while also having a more subtle undercurrent related to race. She was inspired by the New Negro movement as well as modernist abstraction. Gallagher also uses found historical images in her work. She combines formality (grid lines, ruled paper) with the racial stereotypes to depict the "ordering principles" society imposes.

"Blackface minstrel is a ghost story, " Gallagher has noted. "It's about loss; there's a black mask and sublimation...[B]lackface minstrel was the first great American abstraction, even before jazz. It's the literal recording of the African body into American public culture. Disembodied eyes and lips float, hostage, in the electric black of the minstrel stage, distorting the African body into American blackface."

As well as using racially charged imagery, Gallagher is known to portray bodies and include elements of poetry and pop culture in her work. She uses golden tones to portray the racial binary in society. Her media includes paintings, works on paper, film and video. She has made innovative use of materials, such as creating a unique variation on scrimshaw by carving images into the surface of thick sheets of watercolor paper and drawing with ink, watercolor and pencil. Her extensive ongoing series begun in 2001 and titled, Watery Ecstatic, consists of paintings, sculptural objects, and animations to depict sea life through Afrofuturist aesthetics. Gallagher creates different sea creatures to symbolize slave ancestors who died during the transatlantic slave trade across the Atlantic Ocean. These works depict sea creatures, of the mythical undersea world of Drexciya, which were the progeny of slaves who had drowned. This mythology had been conceived by a musical duo of that name, from Detroit. Gallagher commented upon the process of creating these pieces: "The way that these drawings are made is my version of scrimshaw, the carving into bone that sailors did when they were out whaling. I imagine them in this overwhelming, scary expanse of sea where this kind of cutting would give a focus, a sense of being in control of something." Some of Gallagher's work would also consist of codes made from cut out letters. In some of her early pieces, she painted and drew on sheets of penmanship paper (ruled paper used for handwriting practice) she had pasted onto canvas. Her choice of penmanship paper is significant, in an interview with Jessica Morgan, she says "the sense of a neutral surface that can accommodate any mark seems an ideal way of communicating freedom," which is described by her as "idiosyncratic" and "inscrutable". As her previous work has been critiqued for being too racially charged, her newer work contains less explicit racial images to challenge viewers.

In 1995, Gallagher's work was exhibited at the Whitney Biennial and the Venice Biennale in 2003. Artist Chuck Close created a 2009 tapestry portrait of Gallagher. Gallagher is represented by Gagosian Gallery (New York) and Hauser & Wirth (London). She is based in the United States (New York City) and the Netherlands (Rotterdam).

== Awards and fellowships ==
Among the honors that Gallagher has earned are:

- Ann Gund Scholarship, Skowhegan School of Art, Skowhegan, ME (1993)
- Traveling Scholar Award, School of the Museum of Fine Arts, Boston, MA (1993)
- Provincetown Fine Arts Work Center Fellow (1995)
- MacDowell Colony, New Hampshire (1996)
- Joan Mitchell Fellowship (1997)
- American Academy Award in Art (2000)
- Medal of Honor, School of the Museum of Fine Arts, Boston (2001)
- Elected Honorary Royal Academician (HonRA) (2021)

== Selected exhibitions ==
Ellen Gallagher's work has been featured in solo exhibitions at numerous galleries and institutions including:

- Drawing Center, New York City, Preserve (2001)
- Institute of Contemporary Art, Boston USA, "Watery Ecstatic" (2001)

== Publications ==
Murmur. Orbus in collaboration with Edgar Cleijne. Hauser & Wirth London/Fruitmarket Gallery Edinburgh (ed.) 2005. English, 5 books holding together with magnet, 990 pages. With "Blizzard of White" (2003, 55 min loop, 16 mm). ISBN 3039390333

== Collections ==
Gallagher's work is held in many permanent collections including the Addison Gallery of American Art, Goetz Collection, Hamburger Bahnhof, Studio Museum in Harlem, Walker Art Center, San Francisco Museum of Modern Art, Moderna Museet, Sammlung Goetz and the Centre Georges Pompidou.

Specific works include:

- Doll's Eyes, 1992, Rose Art Museum, Waltham, MA
- Afro Mountain, 1994, Whitney Museum of American Art, New York, NY
- Tally, 1994, Museum of Fine Arts, Boston, MA
- Untitled, 1995, Institute of Contemporary Art, Boston, MA
- Delirious Hem, 1995, Metropolitan Museum of Art, New York, NY
- Host, 1996, Seattle Art Museum, Seattle, WA
- Paper Cup, 1996, Tate Modern, London
- Teeth Tracks, 1996, The Broad, Los Angeles, CA
- Untitled, 1996, The Broad, Los Angeles, CA
- Untitled, 1997, Museum of Contemporary Art, Los Angeles, CA
- Untitled, 1998, National Galleries of Scotland
- Untitled, 1999, Art Institute of Chicago, Chicago, IL
- Blubber, 2000, Princeton University Art Museum, Princeton NJ
- They Could Still Serve, 2001, Museum of Modern Art, New York, NY
- Bouffant Pride, 2003, Cleveland Museum of Art, Cleveland, OH
- Water Ecstatic, 2003, Saint Louis Art Museum, St. Louis, MO
- Duke, 2004, Fogg Museum, Cambridge, MA
- DeLuxe, 2004–2005, Institute of Contemporary Art, Boston, MA
- Bird in Hand, 2006, Tate Modern, London, England
