= The Host =

The Host may refer to:

== Literature ==
- "The Guest" (short story), a 1957 short story by Albert Camus whose original French title L'Hôte translates into both "The Guest" and "The Host"
- The Host (Canterbury Tales), a character in Geoffrey Chaucer's The Canterbury Tales
- The Host (novel), a 2008 novel by Stephenie Meyer
- The Host, a 1991 novel by Peter Emshwiller

== Films ==
- The Host (2006 film), a South Korean monster film by Bong Joon-ho
- The Host (2013 film), a film based on Stephenie Meyer's eponymous 2008 novel
- The Host (2020 film), a Dutch mystery thriller film

== Music ==
- "The Host", a song by Built to Spill from Ancient Melodies of the Future (2001)

== Television ==
- "The Host" (Star Trek: The Next Generation), the 97th episode in the television series Star Trek: The Next Generation
- "The Host" (The X-Files), an episode of the television series The X-Files

== Other uses ==
- Lorne (Angel), a character on the television series Angel

== See also ==
- Host (disambiguation)
