= Hostess =

A hostess is a female host or presenter of an event.

Hostess may also refer to:

== Hospitality trades ==
- Air hostess, a flight attendant
- A female maître d' at a restaurant
- An employee at a hostess club
- Bargirl, a paid, female companion offering conversation and, in some cases, sex
- Taxi dancer, a paid, female dancing partner

== Product brands ==
- Hostess Brands, a U.S.-based bakery company formed in 2013
- Hostess Potato Chips, a former Canadian brand owned by Frito-Lay
- Hostess Entertainment, Japanese music company
- Hostess (snack cakes), a brand of snack cakes owned by Hostess Brands

== Other ==
- "Hostess" (short story), by American writer Isaac Asimov
- Hostess House, a 1918 house in Palo Alto, California, U.S.
- The Hostess, a 1995 episode 43 of British television series Keeping Up Appearances
- "Hostess", song by Rudimental from Ground Control, 2021

== See also ==
- Host (disambiguation)
