= Untitled (1998 painting by Ellen Gallagher) =

1998 painting by Ellen Gallagher

- Artist: Ellen Gallagher
- Year: 1998
- Medium: Oil paint and enamel on paper on canvas
- Dimensions: 305.30 cm × 244.40 cm (120.20 in × 96.22 in)
- Location: National Galleries of Scotland

Untitled is a 1998 painting by Ellen Gallagher. It is in the collection of the National Galleries of Scotland in Edinburgh.

The painting is one of many in a series that Gallagher produced consisting of large scale, black paintings that she used to explore her African-American heritage and early stereotypes of African Americans, including minstrel shows. To create Untitled, Gallagher glued paper to a canvas. She used black oil paint on the paper and on top of that, silver paint to create small, human lips in rows.

The piece was acquired by the National Galleries and Scotland in 2008 with money from the Anthony d'Offay Donation and the National Heritage Memorial Fund.

== See also ==
- 1998 in art
