= Bird in Hand (painting) =

Painting by Ellen Gallagher

- Artist: Ellen Gallagher
- Year: 2006
- Medium: Oil paint, ink, paper, polymer, salt and gold leaf on canvas
- Location: Tate Modern; London

Bird in Hand is a 2006 painting by Ellen Gallagher. It is in the collection of the Tate Modern in London, England in the United Kingdom.

== Description ==
The mixed media painting depicts a Black pirate-like figure with a wooden leg and long hair. The figure has an alien-like face and wears a long coat, belt, a puffy, frilly white shirt, and a pair of blue pants. Holding a green parrot in its hand, the figure appears to be standing underwater, on seaweed, surrounded by a coral reef.

== History ==
Gallagher produced the piece at her studio in Rotterdam in the Netherlands. The painting was acquired by the Tate in 2007 as a gift from an anonymous donor. The painting was exhibited at the Tate as part of a solo retrospective of Gallagher's work in 2013 titled "Ellen Gallagher: AxME".

== Insight about the work ==
According to Gallagher, the bird that the figure is holding has "just been caught" and that the name of the painting comes from the feeling experienced by when a person holds a bird too tight in their hand. Tate Modern's Alice Sanger interpreted the painting as being representative of the Atlantic slave trade that stemmed from Cape Verde, where Gallagher's father is from. The use of salt in the painting represents the salt mining that was a major industry in the region. Sanger also suggests that the painting represents a slave turned pirate.

== Reception ==
Metros Amy Dawson described the work's complex amount of paint, gold leaf and mixed media as being "intricate" and part of the artist's fantastical conception of a black Atlantis, populated by the descendants of slaves who perished during the Middle Passage."
