= Hosted Exchange =

Hosted Exchange is a service in the telecommunications industry whereby a provider makes a Microsoft email box and space available on a server so its clients can host their data on the server. The provider manages the hosted data of its clients on the server. Clients can access their emails, address book, task management, and documents from different places and through various media. The e-mails are routed to a laptop or mobile phone through push technology.

The prerequisite for the use of this function is a Microsoft Exchange Server. These systems are available from various service providers including Microsoft itself with Exchange Server hosted as a service.
