= Clustered web hosting =

Clustered hosting is a type of web hosting that spreads the load of hosting across multiple physical machines, or nodes, increasing availability and decreasing the chances of one service (e.g., FTP or email) affecting another (e.g., MySQL). Many large websites run on clustered hosting solutions, for example, large discussion forums will tend to run using multiple front-end webservers with multiple back-end database servers.

Typically, most hosting infrastructures are based on the paradigm of using a single physical machine to host multiple hosted services, including web, database, email, FTP and others. A single physical machine is not only a single point of failure, but also has finite capacity for traffic, that in practice can be troublesome for a busy website or for a website that is experiencing transient bursts in traffic.

By clustering services across multiple hardware machines and using load balancing, single points of failure can be eliminated, increasing availability of a website and other web services beyond that of ordinary single server hosting. A single server can require periodic reboots for software upgrades and the like, whereas in a clustered platform you can stagger the restarts such that the service is still available whilst still upgrading all necessary machines in the cluster.

Clustered hosting is similar to cloud hosting, in that the resources of many machines are available for a website to utilize on demand, making scalability a large advantage to a clustered hosting solution.

== See also ==
- High-availability cluster
