= Business service provider =

A business service provider is one of several categories of service provider in the business world. As opposed to an application service provider which provides application components over a computer network, the services provided by a business service provider are more in the area of infrastructure: mail delivery, building security, finance, administration, and human services.

== Types of business service providers ==
=== Back Office ===
The back office operations are the off-site delivery of a range of non-core service functions, including routine administration tasks and technical support. Offshore back office operations involve the ongoing use of an outsourcing base in another country.

=== Front Office ===
The front office is the part of a company that comes in contact with clients, such as the marketing, sales, and customer service department. In the hotel industry, the front office (also known as front desk) welcomes guests to the accommodation section: meeting and greeting them, taking and organizing reservations, allocating check in and out of rooms, organizing porter service, issuing keys and other security arrangements, passing on messages to customers and settling the accounts.

Examples

- Front Office Solutions Provider
