= Hosts (film) =

2020 film directed by Adam Leader and Richard Oakes

- Film poster
- Directed by: Adam Leader; Richard Oakes
- Written by: Adam Leader
- Story by: Adam Leader; Richard Oakes
- Starring: Neal Ward; Frank Jakeman; Samantha Loxley; Jennifer Preston
- Production companies: Odin's Light; Dark Fable Media
- Distributed by: Alarm Pictures; Dark Sky Films
- Release date: 10 November 2020
- Running time: 89 minutes
- Country: United Kingdom
- Language: English
- Box office: $11,414

Hosts is a 2020 British supernatural horror film directed by Adam Leader and Richard Oakes. Its plot centers on a Christmas dinner that spirals into havoc and bloodshed.

== Cast ==
- Neal Ward as Jack
- Frank Jakeman as Michael
- Samantha Loxley as Lucy
- Jennifer Preston as Cassie
- Lee Hunter as Eric
- Nadia Lamin as Lauren
- Buddy Skelton as Ben
- Adam Leader as Matt
- Sandra Howard-Williams as News Anchor

== Release ==
Hosts was released by Dark Sky Films on November 10, 2020.

== Reception ==
On the review aggregator website Rotten Tomatoes, 82% of 11 critics' reviews are positive. Jack Bottomley of Starburst Magazine praised its performances and said that it is "surely destined to get a cult following." Bobby LePire of Film Threat called the film "unexpected, ruthless, and horrifying", concluding that "the movie is scary, filled to the brim with a sense of dreaded intensity." Anton Bitel of Sight and Sound called the film "unnerving."
