= Untitled (1995 painting by Ellen Gallagher) =

1995 painting by Ellen Gallagher

- Artist: Ellen Gallagher
- Year: 1995
- Medium: Oil, pencil and paper on canvas
- Dimensions: 61 cm × 61 cm (24 in × 24 in)
- Location: Institute of Contemporary Art, Boston

Untitled is a 1995 painting by the American artist Ellen Gallagher. It is in the collection of the Institute of Contemporary Art in Boston, Massachusetts in the United States.

According to Gallagher, this mixed media artwork represents a minstrel show. It comprises a collection of pieces of paper adhered to a canvas like a collage, including two pieces of penmanship paper in the middle. Groups of eyes and red lips are lightly painted onto the pieces of paper. The viewer must get close to the artwork to see the faint lips and eyes.

This work was acquired by the Institute in 2016 as part of an ongoing effort to expand their collection of African American art and abstract figurative art.
