= Application service provider =

Business providing software via the web

An application service provider (ASP) is a business providing application software generally through the Web. ASPs that specialize in a particular application (such as a medical billing program) may be referred to as providing software as a service.

== The ASP model ==
The application software resides on the vendor's system and is accessed by users through a communication protocol. Alternatively, the vendor may provide special purpose client software. Client software may interface with these systems through an application programming interface.

ASP characteristics include:

- ASP hosts the application
- ASP owns, operates and maintains the servers that support the application
- ASP delivers the application to customers via the Internet or a thin client
- ASP may bill on a per-use basis (on-demand outsourcing), a monthly/annual fee, or a per-labor hour basis

The advantages to this approach include:

- Application costs are scaled over multiple customers
- ASP may provide more application experience than the customer's staff
- ASP may provide application customization for the customer
- Application's version is likely to be kept up to date
- Experts manage the application for performance
- Experts research the application for new features

The disadvantages include:

- The customer must rely on the ASP for a critical business function, including security and performance
- The customer may have to accept the application as provided
- The customer may have to adapt to possible application changes
- Integration with other applications may be problematic

== See also ==
- Application server
- Business service provider
- Communication as a service
- Hosted service provider
- Multitenancy
- Outsourcing
- Service level agreement
- Utility computing
- Web application
