= Doll's Eyes (painting) =

1992 painting by Ellen Gallagher

- Artist: Ellen Gallagher
- Year: 1992
- Medium: Oil paint on canvas
- Dimensions: 151.77 cm × 95.89 cm (59.75 in × 37.75 in)
- Location: Rose Art Museum; Waltham

Doll's Eyes is a 1992 painting by the American artist Ellen Gallagher. It is in the collection of the Rose Art Museum in Waltham, Massachusetts.

== Description ==
The painting comprises hundreds, if not thousands, of painted eyeballs that look like googley eyes from toys and dolls. From far away it looks like just a wave of pastel and grey shades, but upon closer inspection, the viewer will see the eyes.

== History ==
The painting was acquired by the Rose Art Museum in 1993. It was a gift from Mrs. William H. Fineshriber, Jr. of New York. Doll's Eyes was part of a Gallagher's 2013 solo show at the Tate Modern titled "Your truths are self-evident. Ours, a mystery."

== Reception ==
Art critic Basia Lewandowska Cummings described the painting as recalling "the work of American minimalist Agnes Martin" after she viewed the piece at the Tate Modern.
