= Hosted service provider =

A hosted service provider (xSP) is a business that delivers a combination of traditional IT functions such as infrastructure, applications (software as a service), security, monitoring, storage, web development, website hosting and email, over the Internet or other wide area networks (WAN). An xSP combines the abilities of an application service provider (ASP) and an Internet service provider (ISP).

This approach enables customers to consolidate and outsource much of their IT needs for a predictable recurring fee. xSPs that integrate web publishing give customers a central repository to rapidly and efficiently distribute information and resources among employees, customers, partners and the general public.

Hosted Service Providers benefit from economies of scale and operate on a one-to-many business model, delivering the same software and services to many customers at once. Customers are charged on a subscription basis.

== Services offered ==
As defined by analyst Ovum.

- Repeatable business process-led services shared among several clients
- Remotely delivered application services using shared resources
- Infrastructure services (both remotely managed and/or hosted services spanning data centre services, managed servers and databases, performance monitoring, security services, storage services and business continuity)
- Web hosting- the provision of infrastructure and application services to support the hosting of Web sites.

== History ==
Hard Corps, Inc., formed in December 1999 claimed the moniker 'xSP' and began using it in commerce prior to others.

== See also ==
- Web servers
- Managed services
