= Sara Hildén =

Finnish businesswoman and art patron (1905–1993)

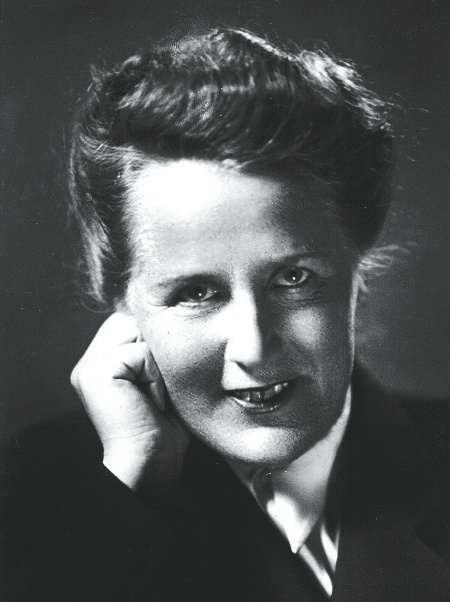
Sara Hildén

Sara (Saara) Ester Hildén (1905–1993) was a Finnish businesswoman and art collector. After meeting the ceramist Rut Bryk in 1944, she developed an interest in contemporary art. This was intensified after her marriage with the painter Erik Enroth in 1949. In the 1950s, she established fashion shops in Tampere and Lahti. Thanks to their success, in 1961 she was able to build an outstanding collection of contemporary Finnish art which was expanded over the years to include items from the world's top international artists. In 1962, it became the basis of the Sara Hildén Foundation which led to Tampere's Sara Hildén Art Museum, opened to the public in 1979. Today the Foundation organizes exhibitions of both Finnish and international art.

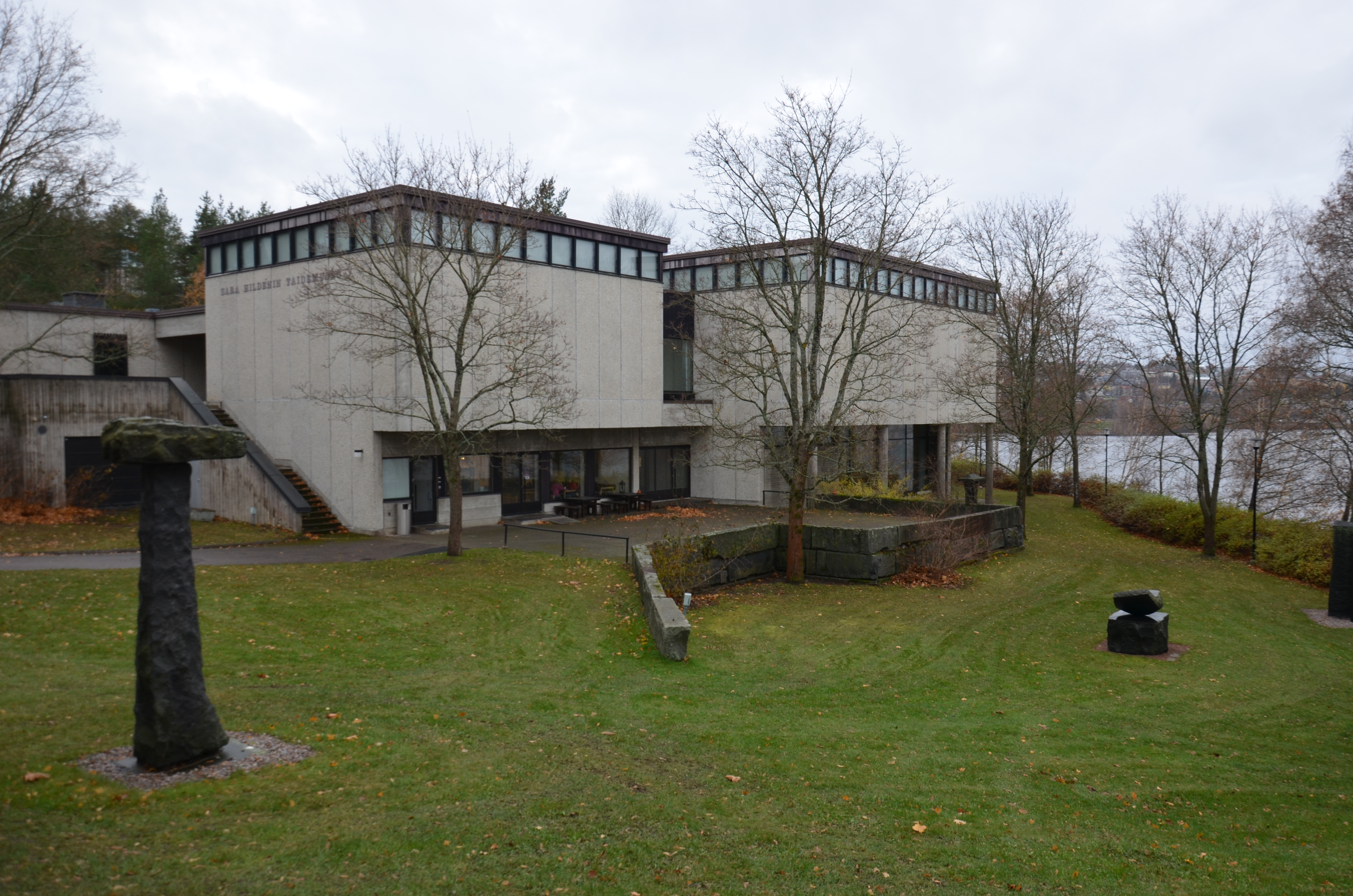
Sara Hildén Art Museum

== Early years ==
Born on 16 August 1905 in Tampere, Sara Ester Hilden was the daughter of Kalle Kustaa Hilden and Ida Maria née Kadel. Brought up in Sääksmäki and Lempäälä, when her parents died in 1919 she moved to stay with relatives in Tampere, working as a nanny and a maid. She changed the spelling of her name to Hildén.

== Career ==
In 1922, she began an apprenticeship in a clothing shop in Tampere and in 1926 became a saleswoman in the city's main costume store. Recognized as a talented businesswoman, in 1938 she was appointed business manager at Tam-Puku, a costume factory. In 1952, she established her own fashion stores, Modehus Hildén in Tampere and Lahti.

Interested in the cultural life of Tampere, in the 1940s she founded Tampereen Teatterikerho (the Tampere Drama Club), attracting writers, artists and theatre people to gather at her home. After she married the painter Erik Enroth in 1949, her artistic contacts widened further, providing a basis for her to become acquainted with the world of contemporary art. In 1961 she decided to start her own art collection, and the following year, she established the Sara Hildén Foundation to coordinate its expansion. Funded by profits from her fashion stores, she acquired not only Finnish art but a wide variety of works from abroad.

To add to her collection, Hildén relied on advice from E. J. Vehmas and Leena Peltola of Hensinki's Ateneum Art Museum as well as from the art historian Salme Sarajas-Korte. In addition, she traveled widely, to the Venice Biennale and to the galleries and museums of Paris.

== Death ==
Sara Hildén died in Tampere on 7 October 1993.

== Sara Hildén Art Museum ==
Initially housed in Hatanpää Manor, in collaboration with Tampere's municipal authorities, in 1979, Hildén's collection was opened to the public in the specially constructed Sara Hildén Art Museum. Thanks to Hildén's efforts, Finland has been recognized for its interest in modern art.
