= Host (psychology) =

Primary identity in a patient with DID

In psychology and mental health, the host is the most prominent personality, state, or identity in someone who has dissociative identity disorder (DID) (formerly known as multiple personality disorder). The other personalities, besides the host, are known as alter personalities, or just "alters". The host may or may not be the original personality, which is the personality a person is born with. Additionally, the host may or may not be the personality that coincides with the official legal name of the person. Often this is thought to be the root of the person's psyche, or at least a key figure for completion of therapy, whether or not it has integration of the host and alters as a goal.

There are arguments that a person can have multiple hosts.

== Prevalence ==
In some very mild forms of DID, the host can be present for extended periods of time, up to years without ever allowing an alter to take the forefront. In these cases, the host is very resilient to stress and other factors that often cause switches.

In severe cases, there is often large amounts of switching and the person may not spend that much time in any state, including the host. In cases where the host is often present, there are a few triggers that can cause the host to retreat.

== Treatment ==
The host is often the personality that seeks treatment. Therefore, the psychotherapists often deal primarily with the host personality. Part of the therapeutic process for DID involves helping the host recognize the alters and become aware when the alters are present. In some cases, the host is unaware of any alters or even that they have DID. In other cases, the host is aware of their condition, but they may not be aware of what the alters are or what they do while in those states. There are situations where the host wants therapy; however, one or more of the alters does not and can try to end the therapeutic process. While the host is aware of the person's body, the alters are not always aware that they share the same body as the host, which can lead to belief that suicide would have no effect on the host.

== Brain scans ==
Brain scans can be used to distinguish between host and alter personalities. The host often shows higher EEG coherence than alter personalities. This difference provides objective evidence that there is different neuronal activity between host and alter personalities. There has been brain scan evidence to show that stressful or traumatic memories are often much more present in the alter personalities than the host.

== Legal impact ==
There are mixed views on how to treat people with DID in legal situations. Arguments have been made that each alter should be treated as an independent person. Other arguments have been made that a person should only be responsible if it is the host personality that committed the crime. Since the host may not use the official name of the person, there can be disputes on which identities are responsible for an action.
