= Dedicated hosting service =

Type of Internet hosting

A dedicated hosting service, dedicated server, or managed hosting service is a type of Internet hosting in which a client leases the exclusive use of an entire physical server, rather than sharing its resources with other customers. Compared with shared hosting, dedicated hosting provides greater flexibility because the customer has full control over the server, including the choice of operating system, hardware configuration, and software.

There is also another level of dedicated or managed hosting commonly referred to as complex managed hosting. Complex managed hosting applies to both physical dedicated servers, hybrid server and virtual servers, with many companies choosing a hybrid (combination of physical and virtual) hosting solution.

There are many similarities between standard and complex managed hosting but the key difference is the level of administrative and engineering support that the customer pays for – owing to both the increased size and complexity of the infrastructure deployment. The provider steps in to take over most of the management, including security, memory, storage and IT support. The service is primarily proactive in nature.

Server administration can usually be provided by the hosting company as an add-on service. In some cases a dedicated server can offer less overhead and a larger return on investment. Dedicated servers are hosted in data centers, often providing redundant power sources and HVAC systems. In contrast to colocation, the server hardware is owned by the provider and in some cases they will provide support for operating systems or applications.

Dedicated hosting typically provides higher performance, greater security, increased reliability, and greater administrative control than shared hosting. Because of its higher cost, it is most commonly used for websites and applications with high traffic volumes or specialized performance and security requirements.

== Operating system support ==
Availability, price and employee familiarity often determines which operating systems are offered on dedicated servers. Variations of Linux and Unix (open source operating systems) are often included at no charge to the customer. Commercial operating systems include Microsoft Windows Server, provided through a special program called Microsoft Services Provider License Agreement, or SPLA.

Red Hat Enterprise is a commercial version of Linux offered to hosting providers on a monthly fee basis. The monthly fee provides OS updates through the Red Hat Network using an application called Yum. Other operating systems are available from the open source community at no charge. These include CentOS, Fedora Core, Debian, and many other Linux distributions or BSD systems FreeBSD, NetBSD, OpenBSD.

Support for any of these operating systems typically depends on the level of management offered with a particular dedicated server plan. Operating system support may include updates to the core system in order to acquire the latest security fixes, patches, and system-wide vulnerability resolutions. Updates to core operating systems include kernel upgrades, service packs, application updates, and security patches that keep the server secure and safe. Operating system updates and support relieves the burden of server management from the dedicated server owner.

== Bandwidth and connectivity ==
Bandwidth refers to the data transfer rate or the amount of data that can be carried from one point to another in a given time period (usually a second) and is often represented in bits (of data) per second (bit/s).

=== 95th percentile method ===
Line speed, billed on the 95th percentile, refers to the speed in which data flows from the server or device, measured every five minutes for the month, and dropping the top 5% of measurements that are highest, and basing the usage for the month on the next-highest measurement. This is similar to a median measurement, which can be thought of as a 50th percentile measurement (with 50% of measurements above, and 50% of measurements below), whereas this sets the cutoff at 95th percentile, with 5% of measurements above the value, and 95% of measurements below the value. This is also known as Burstable billing. Line speed is measured in bits per second (or kilobits per second, megabits per second or gigabits per second).

=== Unmetered method ===
The second bandwidth measurement is unmetered service where providers cap or control the "top line" speed for a server. Top line speed in unmetered bandwidth is the total Mbit/s allocated to the server and configured on the switch level. Unmetered bandwidth services usually incur an additional charge. The term "unmetered" is often confused with "unlimited", especially when comparing seedbox service plans.

=== Total transfer method ===
Some providers will calculate the Total Transfer, which is the measurement of actual data leaving and arriving, measured in bytes. Although it is typically the sum of all traffic into and out of the server, some providers measure only outbound traffic (traffic from the server to the internet).

=== Bandwidth pooling ===
One of the reasons for choosing to outsource dedicated servers is the availability of high powered networks from multiple providers. As dedicated server providers utilize massive amounts of bandwidth, they are able to secure lower volume based pricing to include a multi-provider blend of bandwidth. To achieve the same type of network without a multi-provider blend of bandwidth, a large investment in core routers, long term contracts, and expensive monthly bills would need to be in place. The expenses needed to develop a network without a multi-provider blend of bandwidth does not make sense economically for hosting providers.

Many dedicated server providers include a service level agreement based on network up-time. Some dedicated server hosting providers offer a 100% up-time guarantee on their network. By securing multiple vendors for connectivity and using redundant hardware, providers are able to guarantee higher up-times; usually between 99 and 100% up-time if they are a higher quality provider. One aspect of higher quality providers is they are most likely to be multi-homed across multiple quality up-link providers, which in turn, provides significant redundancy in the event one goes down in addition to potentially improved routes to destinations.

Bandwidth consumption over the last several years has shifted from a per megabit usage model to a per gigabyte usage model. Bandwidth was traditionally measured inline speed access that included the ability to purchase needed megabits at a given monthly cost. As the shared hosting model developed, the trend towards gigabyte or total bytes transferred, replaced the megabit line speed model so dedicated server providers started offering per gigabyte.

== Management ==
Dedicated hosting services differ from managed hosting services primarily in the level of administrative support provided. Managed hosting typically includes services such as server monitoring, software updates, security management, and technical support, whereas unmanaged dedicated hosting places responsibility for server administration on the customer. As a result, managed hosting is generally intended for customers with limited system administration expertise, while unmanaged dedicated hosting is more commonly used by organizations or individuals with the technical resources to manage their own servers. The scope of management services varies among providers.

Hosting platforms such as WordPress.com, for instance, provide hosting infrastructure, security updates, backups, and technical support for websites while abstracting much of the underlying server administration from end users. Some platforms also provide integrated e-commerce functionality and developer tools.

To date, no industry standards have been set to clearly define the management role of dedicated server providers. What this means is that each provider will use industry standard terms, but each provider will define them differently. For some dedicated server providers, fully managed is defined as having a web based control panel while other providers define it as having dedicated system engineers readily available to handle all server and network related functions of the dedicated server provider.

=== Server management ===
Server management can include some or all of the following:

- Operating system updates
- Application updates
- Server monitoring
- SNMP hardware monitoring
- Application monitoring
- Application management
- Technical support
- Firewall services
- Anti-spam software
- Antivirus updates
- Security audits
- DDoS protection and mitigation
- Intrusion detection
- Backups and restoration
- Disaster recovery
- DNS hosting service
- Load balancing
- Database administration
- Performance tuning
- Out-of-band Management
- Software installation and configuration
- User management
- Programming consultation

Dedicated hosting server providers define their level of management based on the services they provide. In comparison, fully managed could equal self managed from provider to provider.

Administrative maintenance of the operating system, often including upgrades, security patches, and sometimes even daemon updates are included. Differing levels of management may include adding users, domains, daemon configuration, or even custom programming.

=== Dedicated server hosting providers ===
Dedicated server hosting providers may provide the following types of server managed support:

- Fully managed – Includes monitoring, software updates, reboots, security patches and operating system upgrades. Customers are completely hands-off.
- Managed – Includes medium level of management, monitoring, updates, and a limited amount of support. Customers may perform specific tasks.
- Self-managed – Includes regular monitoring and some maintenance. Customers provide most operations and tasks on dedicated server.
- Unmanaged – Little to no involvement from service provider. Customers provide all maintenance, upgrades, patches, and security.

== Security ==
Dedicated hosting server providers utilize extreme security measures to ensure the safety of data stored on their network of servers. Providers will often deploy various software programs for scanning systems and networks for obtrusive invaders, spammers, hackers, and other harmful problems such as Trojans, worms, and crashers (Sending multiple connections). Linux and Windows use different software for security protection.

== Software ==
Providers often bill for dedicated servers on a fixed monthly price to include specific software packages. Over the years, software vendors realized the significant market opportunity to bundle their software with dedicated servers. They have since started introducing pricing models that allow dedicated hosting providers the ability to purchase and resell software based on reduced monthly fees.

Microsoft offers software licenses through a program called the Service Provider License Agreement. The SPLA model provides use of Microsoft products through a monthly user or processor based fee. SPLA software includes the Windows Operating System, Microsoft SQL Server, Microsoft Exchange Server, Microsoft SharePoint and shoutcast hosting, and many other server based products.

Other software applications available are specialized web hosting specific programs called control panels. Control panel software is an all-inclusive set of software applications, server applications, and automation tools that can be installed on a dedicated server. Control panels include integration into web servers, database applications, programming languages, application deployment, server administration tasks, and include the ability to automate tasks via a web based front end.

== Limitations ==
Many providers do not allow IRC (bots, clients or daemons). This is due to rogue IRC users triggering DDoS attacks against the provider, which may overwhelm their networks, lowering service quality for all customers.

- Adult content is disallowed by many providers as it may either be of questionable legality or consume large amounts of bandwidth.
- Copyright violations – Hosting copyrighted material of which an individual does not own the copyright to is against the terms of service of most hosting companies.

== See also ==
- Data center
- Hosting environment
- Self-hosting (web services)
- Virtual private server
- Cloud computing
