= Virtual private server =

Virtual machine running on a host computer

A virtual private server (VPS) or virtual dedicated server (VDS) is a virtual machine sold as a service by an Internet hosting company.

A virtual private server runs its own copy of an operating system (OS), and customers may have superuser-level access to that operating system instance, so they can install almost any software that runs on that OS. For many purposes, it is functionally equivalent to a dedicated physical server and, being software-defined, can be created and configured more easily. A virtual server costs less than an equivalent physical server. However, as virtual servers share the underlying physical hardware with other VPS, performance may be lower depending on the workload of any other executing virtual machines.

== Virtualization ==
The force driving server virtualization is similar to that which led to the development of time-sharing and multiprogramming in the past. Although the resources are still shared, as under the time-sharing model, virtualization provides a higher level of security, dependent on the type of virtualization used, as the individual virtual servers are mostly isolated from each other and may run their own full-fledged operating system which can be independently rebooted as a virtual instance.

Partitioning a single server to appear as multiple servers has been increasingly common on microcomputers since the release of VMware ESX Server in 2001. VMware later replaced ESX Server with VMware ESXi, a more lightweight hypervisor architecture that eliminated the Linux-based Console Operating System (COS) used in the original ESX. The physical server typically runs a hypervisor which is tasked with creating, releasing, and managing the resources of "guest" operating systems, or virtual machines. These guest operating systems are allocated a share of resources of the physical server, typically in a manner in which the guest is not aware of any other physical resources except for those allocated to it by the hypervisor. As a VPS runs its own copy of its operating system, customers have superuser-level access to that operating system instance, and can install almost any software that runs on the OS; however, due to the number of virtualization clients typically running on a single machine, a VPS generally has limited processor time, RAM, and disk space.

There are several approaches to virtualization. In hardware virtualization, a hypervisor such as the Kernel-based Virtual Machine allows each virtual machine (VM) to run its own independent kernel, providing greater isolation from the host system. By contrast, container-based virtualization—for example OpenVZ—shares the host kernel among multiple containers. This can improve resource efficiency, but usually offers less isolation and fewer customization options for each instance.

== Hosting ==
Many companies offer virtual private server hosting or virtual dedicated server hosting as an extension for web hosting services. There are several challenges to consider when licensing proprietary software in multi-tenant virtual environments.

With unmanaged or self-managed hosting, the customer is left to administer their own server instance.

Unmetered hosting is generally offered with no limit on the amount of data transferred on a fixed bandwidth line. Usually, unmetered hosting is offered with 10 Mbit/s, 100 Mbit/s, or 1000 Mbit/s (with some as high as 10 Gbit/s). This means that the customer is theoretically able to use approximately 3 TB on 10 Mbit/s or up to approximately 300 TB on a 1000 Mbit/s line per month; although in practice the values will be significantly less. In a virtual private server, this will be shared bandwidth and a fair usage policy should be involved. Unlimited hosting is also commonly marketed, but generally limited by acceptable usage policies and terms of service. Offers of unlimited disk space and bandwidth are always false due to cost, carrier capacities, and technological boundaries.

== See also ==
- Comparison of platform virtualization software
- Cloud computing
- Virtual central processing unit (vCPU)
- Virtual private cloud
