= Fact-checking =

Process of verifying information in non-fictional text

Fact-checking is the process of verifying the factual accuracy of questioned reporting and statements. Fact-checking can be conducted before or after the text or content is published or otherwise disseminated. Internal fact-checking is such checking done in-house by the publisher to prevent inaccurate content from being published; when the text is analyzed by a third party, the process is called external fact-checking.

Research suggests that fact-checking can indeed correct perceptions among citizens, as well as discourage politicians from spreading false or misleading claims. However, corrections may decay over time or be overwhelmed by cues from elites who promote less accurate claims. Political fact-checking is sometimes criticized as being opinion journalism.

== History of fact-checking ==
Sensationalist newspapers in the 1850s and later led to a gradual need for a more factual media. Colin Dickey has described the subsequent evolution of fact-checking. Key elements were the establishment of Associated Press in the 1850s (short factual material needed), Ralph Pulitzer of the New York World (his Bureau of Accuracy and Fair Play, 1912), Henry Luce and Time magazine (original working title: Facts), and the famous fact-checking department of The New Yorker. More recently, the mainstream media has come under severe economic threat from online startups. In addition, the rapid spread of misinformation and conspiracy theories via social media is slowly creeping into mainstream media. One solution is for more media staff to be assigned a fact-checking role, as for example The Washington Post. Independent fact-checking organisations have also become prominent, such as PolitiFact.

== Types of fact-checking ==
Ante hoc fact-checking aims to identify errors so that the text can be corrected before dissemination, or perhaps rejected. Post hoc fact-checking is most often followed by a written report of inaccuracies, sometimes with a visual metric provided by the checking organization (e.g., Pinocchios from The Washington Post Fact Checker, or TRUTH-O-METER ratings from PolitiFact). Several organizations are devoted to post hoc fact-checking: examples include FactCheck.org and PolitiFact in the US, Full Fact in the UK, and Africa Check in several nations within the African continent.

External post hoc fact-checking organizations first arose in the US in the early 2000s, and the concept grew in relevance and spread to various other countries during the 2010s.

== Post hoc fact-checking ==
External post hoc fact-checking by independent organizations began in the United States in the early 2000s. In the 2010s, particularly following the 2016 election of Donald Trump as US President, fact-checking gained a rise in popularity and spread to multiple countries mostly in Europe and Latin America. However, the US remains the largest market for fact-checking.

=== Consistency across fact-checking organizations ===
In 2016 a study finds that fact-checkers PolitiFact, FactCheck.org, and The Washington Post's Fact Checker overwhelmingly agree on their evaluations of claims. A 2018 paper found little overlap in the statements checked by different fact-checking organizations. This paper compared 1,178 published fact-checks from PolitiFact with 325 fact-checks from The Washington Post's Fact Checker, and found only 77 statements (about 5%) that both organizations checked. For those 77 statements, the fact-checking organizations gave the same ratings for 49 statements and similar ratings for 22, about 92% agreement.

=== Choice of which statements to check ===
Different fact-checking organizations have shown different tendencies in their choice of which statements they publish fact-checks about. For example, some are more likely to fact-check a statement about climate change being real, and others are more likely to fact-check a statement about climate change being fake.

=== Effects ===
Studies of post hoc fact-checking have made clear that such efforts often result in changes in the behavior, in general, of both the speaker (making them more careful in their pronouncements) and of the listener or reader (making them more discerning with regard to the factual accuracy of content); observations include the propensities of audiences to be completely unpersuaded by corrections to errors regarding the most divisive subjects, or the tendency to be more greatly persuaded by corrections of negative reporting (e.g., "attack ads"), and to see minds changed only when the individual in error was someone reasonably like-minded to begin with.

==== Correcting misperceptions ====
Studies have shown that fact-checking can affect citizens' belief in the accuracy of claims made in political advertisement. A 2020 study by Paris School of Economics and Sciences Po economists found that falsehoods by Marine Le Pen during the 2017 French presidential election campaign, (i) successfully persuaded voters, (ii) lost their persuasiveness when fact-checked, and (iii) did not reduce voters' political support for Le Pen when her claims were fact-checked. A 2017 study in the Journal of Politics found that "individuals consistently update political beliefs in the appropriate direction, even on facts that have clear implications for political party reputations, though they do so cautiously and with some bias. Interestingly, those who identify with one of the political parties are no more biased or cautious than pure independents in their learning, conditional on initial beliefs."

A study by Yale University cognitive scientists Gordon Pennycook, Adam Bear, Evan Collins, and David G. Rand found that Facebook tags of fake articles "did significantly reduce their perceived accuracy relative to a control without tags, but only modestly". A Dartmouth study led by Brendan Nyhan found that Facebook tags had a greater impact than the Yale study found. A "disputed" tag on a false headline reduced the number of respondents who considered the headline accurate from 29% to 19%, whereas a "rated false" tag pushed the number down to 16%. A 2019 study found that the "disputed" tag reduced Facebook users' intentions to share a fake news story. The Yale study found evidence of a backfire effect among Trump supporters younger than 26 years whereby the presence of both untagged and tagged fake articles made the untagged fake articles appear more accurate. In response to research which questioned the effectiveness of the Facebook "disputed" tags, Facebook decided to drop the tags in December 2017 and would instead put articles which fact-checked a fake news story next to the fake news story link whenever it is shared on Facebook.

Based on the findings of a 2017 study in the journal Psychological Science, the most effective ways to reduce misinformation through corrections is by:

- limiting detailed descriptions of / or arguments in favor of the misinformation;
- walking through the reasons why a piece of misinformation is false rather than just labelling it false;
- presenting new and credible information which allows readers to update their knowledge of events and understand why they developed an inaccurate understanding in the first place;
- using video, as videos appear to be more effective than text at increasing attention and reducing confusion, making videos more effective at correcting misperception than text.

Large studies by Ethan Porter and Thomas J. Wood found that misinformation propagated by Donald Trump was more difficult to dispel with the same techniques, and generated the following recommendations:

- Highly credible sources are the most effective, especially those which surprisingly report facts against their own perceived bias
- Reframing the issue by adding context can be more effective than simply labeling it as incorrect or unproven.
- Challenging readers' identity or worldview reduces effectiveness.
- Fact-checking immediately is more effective, before false ideas have spread widely.

A 2019 meta-analysis of research into the effects of fact-checking on misinformation found that fact-checking has substantial positive impacts on political beliefs, but that this impact weakened when fact-checkers used "truth scales", refuted only parts of a claim and when they fact-checked campaign-related statements. Individuals' preexisting beliefs, ideology, and knowledge affected to what extent the fact-checking had an impact. A 2019 study in the Journal of Experimental Political Science found "strong evidence that citizens are willing to accept corrections to fake news, regardless of their ideology and the content of the fake stories."

A 2018 study found that Republicans were more likely to correct their false information on voter fraud if the correction came from Breitbart News rather than a non-partisan neutral source such as PolitiFact. A 2022 study found that individuals exposed to a fact-check of a false statement by a far-right politician were less likely to share the false statement.

Some studies have found that exposure to fact-checks had durable effects on reducing misperceptions, whereas other studies have found no effects.

Scholars have debated whether fact-checking could lead to a "backfire effect" whereby correcting false information may make partisan individuals cling more strongly to their views. One study found evidence of such a "backfire effect", but several other studies did not.

==== Political discourse ====
A 2015 experimental study found that fact-checking can encourage politicians to not spread misinformation. The study found that it might help improve political discourse by increasing the reputational costs or risks of spreading misinformation for political elites. The researchers sent, "a series of letters about the risks to their reputation and electoral security if they were caught making questionable statements. The legislators who were sent these letters were substantially less likely to receive a negative fact-checking rating or to have their accuracy questioned publicly, suggesting that fact-checking can reduce inaccuracy when it poses a salient threat."

Fact-checking may also encourage some politicians to engage in "strategic ambiguity" in their statements, which "may impede the fact-checking movement's goals."

==== Political preferences ====
One experimental study found that fact-checking during debates affected viewers' assessment of the candidates' debate performance and "greater willingness to vote for a candidate when the fact-check indicates that the candidate is being honest."

A study of Trump supporters during the 2016 presidential campaign found that while fact-checks of false claims made by Trump reduced his supporters' belief in the false claims in question, the corrections did not alter their attitudes towards Trump.

A 2019 study found that "summary fact-checking", where the fact-checker summarizes how many false statements a politician has made, has a greater impact on reducing support for a politician than fact-checking of individual statements made by the politician.

=== Informal fact-checking ===
Individual readers perform some types of fact-checking, such as comparing claims in one news story against claims in another.

Rabbi Moshe Benovitz, has observed that: "modern students use their wireless worlds to augment skepticism and to reject dogma." He says this has positive implications for values development:

Fact-checking can become a learned skill, and technology can be harnessed in a way that makes it second nature... By finding opportunities to integrate technology into learning, students will automatically sense the beautiful blending of… their cyber… [and non-virtual worlds]. Instead of two spheres coexisting uneasily and warily orbiting one another, there is a valuable experience of synthesis....

According to Queen's University Belfast researcher Jennifer Rose, because fake news is created with the intention of misleading readers, online news consumers who attempt to fact-check the articles they read may incorrectly conclude that a fake news article is legitimate. Rose states, "A diligent online news consumer is likely at a pervasive risk of inferring truth from false premises" and suggests that fact-checking alone is not enough to reduce fake news consumption. Despite this, Rose asserts that fact-checking "ought to remain on educational agendas to help combat fake news".

=== Detecting fake news ===
The term fake news became popularized with the 2016 United States presidential election, causing concern among some that online media platforms were especially susceptible to disseminating disinformation and misinformation. Fake news articles tend to come from either satirical news websites or from websites with an incentive to propagate false information, either as clickbait or to serve a purpose. The language, specifically, is typically more inflammatory in fake news than real articles, in part because the purpose is to confuse and generate clicks. Furthermore, modeling techniques such as n-gram encodings and bag of words have served as other linguistic techniques to estimate the legitimacy of a news source. On top of that, researchers have determined that visual-based cues also play a factor in categorizing an article, specifically some features can be designed to assess if a picture was legitimate and provides us more clarity on the news. There is also many social context features that can play a role, as well as the model of spreading the news. Websites such as "Snopes" try to detect this information manually, while certain universities are trying to build mathematical models to assist in this work.

Some individuals and organizations publish their fact-checking efforts on the internet. These may have a special subject-matter focus, such as Snopes.com's focus on urban legends or the Reporters' Lab at Duke University's focus on providing resources to journalists.

=== Fake news and social media ===
The adaptation of social media as a legitimate and commonly used platform has created extensive concerns for fake news in this domain. The spread of fake news via social media platforms such as Facebook, Twitter and Instagram presents the opportunity for extremely negative effects on society therefore new fields of research regarding fake news detection on social media is gaining momentum. However, fake news detection on social media presents challenges that renders previous data mining and detection techniques inadequate. As such, researchers are calling for more work to be done regarding fake news as characterized against psychology and social theories and adapting existing data mining algorithms to apply to social media networks. Further, multiple scientific articles have been published urging the field further to find automatic ways in which fake news can be filtered out of social media timelines.

==== Methodology ====
Lateral reading, or getting a brief overview of a topic from lots of sources instead of digging deeply into one, is a popular method professional fact-checkers use to quickly get a better sense of the truth of a particular claim.

Digital tools and services commonly used by fact-checkers include, but are not limited to:

- Reverse image search engines (Google Images, TinEye, Bing Image Search, Baidu Image Search, Yandex Image Search)
- Archiving services (Internet Archive, Archive.today, Perma.cc)
- Encyclopedias (Wikipedia)
- Web analytics platforms (Similarweb)
- Image and video analysis tools (InVID, FotoForensics)
- Domain registration information (DomainTools, DomainBigData, WHOIS.com)
- General search engines (Google Search)
- Web mapping platforms (Google Maps, Google Street View, Google Earth, Yandex Maps)
- Social media monitoring platforms (CrowdTangle, TweetDeck, BuzzSumo)

==== Ongoing research in fact-checking and detecting fake news ====
Since the 2016 United States presidential election, fake news has been a popular topic of discussion by President Trump and news outlets. The reality of fake news had become omnipresent, and a lot of research has gone into understanding, identifying, and combating fake news. Also, a number of researchers began with the usage of fake news to influence the 2016 presidential campaign. One research found evidence of pro-Trump fake news being selectively targeted on conservatives and pro-Trump supporters in 2016. The researchers found that social media sites, Facebook in particular, to be powerful platforms to spread certain fake news to targeted groups to appeal to their sentiments during the 2016 presidential race. Additionally, researchers from Stanford, NYU, and NBER found evidence to show how engagement with fake news on Facebook and Twitter was high throughout 2016.

Recently, a lot of work has gone into helping detect and identify fake news through machine learning and artificial intelligence. In 2018, researchers at MIT's CSAIL created and tested a machine learning algorithm to identify false information by looking for common patterns, words, and symbols that typically appear in fake news. More so, they released an open-source data set with a large catalog of historical news sources with their veracity scores to encourage other researchers to explore and develop new methods and technologies for detecting fake news.

In 2022, researchers have also demonstrated the feasibility of falsity scores for popular and official figures by developing such for over 800 contemporary elites on Twitter as well as associated exposure scores.

There are also demonstrations of platform-built-in (by-design) as well browser-integrated (currently in the form of addons) misinformation mitigation. Efforts such as providing and viewing structured accuracy assessments on posts "are not currently supported by the platforms". Trust in the default or, in decentralized designs, user-selected providers of assessments (and their reliability) as well as the large quantities of posts and articles are two of the problems such approaches may face. Moreover, they cannot mitigate misinformation in chats, print-media and TV.

==== International Fact-Checking Day ====
The concept for International Fact-Checking Day was introduced at a conference for journalists and fact-checkers at the London School of Economics and Political Science in June 2014. The holiday was officially created in 2016 and first celebrated on April 2, 2017. The idea for International Fact-Checking day rose out of the many misinformation campaigns found on the internet, particularly social media sites. It rose in importance after the 2016 elections, which brought fake news, as well as accusations of it, to the forefront of media issues. The holiday is held on April 2 because "April 1 is a day for fools. April 2 is a day for facts." Activities for International Fact-Checking Day consist of various media organizations contributing to fact-checking resources, articles, and lessons for students and the general public to learn more about how to identify fake news and stop the spread of misinformation. 2020's International Fact-Checking Day focused specifically on how to accurately identify information about COVID-19.

=== Limitations and controversies ===
Research has shown that fact-checking has limits, and can even backfire, which is when a correction increases the belief in the misconception. One reason is that it can be interpreted as an argument from authority, leading to resistance and hardening beliefs, "because identity and cultural positions cannot be disproved." In other words "while news articles can be fact-checked, personal beliefs cannot."

Critics argue that political fact-checking is increasingly used as opinion journalism. Criticism has included that fact-checking organizations in themselves are biased or that it is impossible to apply absolute terms such as "true" or "false" to inherently debatable claims. In September 2016, a Rasmussen Reports national telephone and online survey found that "just 29% of all Likely U.S. Voters trust media fact-checking of candidates' comments. Sixty-two percent (62%) believe instead that news organizations skew the facts to help candidates they support."

A paper by Andrew Guess (of Princeton University), Brendan Nyhan (Dartmouth College) and Jason Reifler (University of Exeter) found that consumers of fake news tended to have less favorable views of fact-checking, in particular Trump supporters. The paper found that fake news consumers rarely encountered fact-checks: "only about half of the Americans who visited a fake news website during the study period also saw any fact-check from one of the dedicated fact-checking website (14.0%)."

Deceptive websites that pose as fact-checkers have also been used to promote disinformation; this tactic has been used by both Russia and Turkey.

During the COVID-19 pandemic, Facebook announced it would "remove false or debunked claims about the novel coronavirus which created a global pandemic", based on its fact-checking partners, collectively known as the International Fact-Checking Network. In 2021, Facebook reversed its ban on posts speculating the COVID-19 disease originated from Chinese labs, following developments in the investigations into the origin of COVID-19, including claims by the Biden administration, and a letter by eighteen scientists in the journal Science, saying a new investigation is needed because 'theories of accidental release from a lab and zoonotic spillover both remain viable." The policy led to an article by The New York Post that suggested a lab leak would be plausible to be initially labeled as "false information" on the platform. This reignited debates into the notion of scientific consensus. In an article published by the medical journal The BMJ, journalist Laurie Clarke said "The contentious nature of these decisions is partly down to how social media platforms define the slippery concepts of misinformation versus disinformation. This decision relies on the idea of a scientific consensus. But some scientists say that this smothers heterogeneous opinions, problematically reinforcing a misconception that science is a monolith." David Spiegelhalter, the Winton Professor of the Public Understanding of Risk at Cambridge University, argued that "behind closed doors, scientists spend the whole time arguing and deeply disagreeing on some fairly fundamental things". Clarke further argued that "The binary idea that scientific assertions are either correct or incorrect has fed into the divisiveness that has characterised the pandemic."

Several commentators have noted limitations of political post-hoc fact-checking. While interviewing Andrew Hart in 2019 about political fact-checking in the United States, Nima Shirazi and Adam Johnson discuss what they perceive as an unspoken conservative bias framed as neutrality in certain fact-checks, citing argument from authority, "hyper-literal ... scolding [of] people on the left who criticized the assumptions of American imperialism", rebuttals that may not be factual themselves, issues of general media bias, and "the near ubiquitous refusal to identify patterns, trends, and ... intent in politicians' ... false statements". They further argue that political fact-checking focuses exclusively on describing facts over making moral judgments (ex., the is–ought problem), assert that it relies on public reason to attempt to discredit public figures, and question its effectiveness on conspiracy theories or fascism.

Likewise, writing in The Hedgehog Review in 2023, Jonathan D. Teubner and Paul W. Gleason assert that fact-checking is ineffective against propaganda for at least three reasons: "First, since much of what skillful propagandists say will be true on a literal level, the fact-checker will be unable to refute them. Second, no matter how well-intentioned or convincing, the fact-check will also spread the initial claims further. Third, even if the fact-checker manages to catch a few inaccuracies, the larger picture and suggestion will remain in place, and it is this suggestion that moves minds and hearts, and eventually actions." They also note the very large amount of false information that regularly spreads around the world, overwhelming the hundreds of fact-checking groups; caution that a fact-checker systemically addressing propaganda potentially compromises their objectivity; and argue that even descriptive statements are subjective, leading to conflicting points of view. As a potential step to a solution, the authors suggest the need of a "scientific community" to establish falsifiable theories, "which in turn makes sense of the facts", noting the difficulty that this step would face in the digital media landscape of the Internet.

Social media platforms – Facebook in particular – have been accused by journalists and academics of undermining fact-checkers by providing them with little assistance; including "propagandist-linked organizations" such as CheckYourFact as partners; promoting outlets that have shared false information such as Breitbart and The Daily Caller on Facebook's newsfeed; and removing a fact-check about a false anti-abortion claim after receiving pressure from Republican senators. In 2022 and 2023, many social media platforms such as Meta, YouTube and Twitter have significantly reduced resources in Trust and safety, including fact-checking. Twitter under Elon Musk has severely limited access by academic researchers to Twitter's API by replacing previously free access with a subscription that starts at $42,000 per month, and by denying requests for access under the Digital Services Act. After the 2023 Reddit API changes, journalists, researchers and former Reddit moderators have expressed concerns about the spread of harmful misinformation, a relative lack of subject matter expertise from replacement mods, a vetting process of replacement mods seen as haphazard, a loss of third party tools often used for content moderation, and the difficulty for academic researchers to access Reddit data. Many fact-checkers rely heavily on social media platform partnerships for funding, technology and distributing their fact-checks.

Commentators have also shared concerns about the use of false equivalence as an argument in political fact-checking, citing examples from The Washington Post, The New York Times and The Associated Press where "mainstream fact-checkers appear to have attempted to manufacture false claims from progressive politicians...[out of] a desire to appear objective".

The term "fact-check" is also appropriated and overused by "partisan sites", which may lead people to "disregard fact-checking as a meaningless, motivated exercise if all content is claimed to be fact-checked".

Fact-checking journalists have been harassed online and offline, ranging from hate mail and death threats to police intimidation and lawfare.

==== Fact-checking in countries with limited freedom of speech ====
Operators of some fact-checking websites in China admit to self-censorship. Fact-checking websites in China often avoid commenting on political, economic, and other current affairs. Several Chinese fact-checking websites have been criticized for lack of transparency with regard to their methodology and sources, and for following Chinese propaganda.

== Pre-publication fact-checking ==
Among the benefits of printing only checked copy is that it averts serious, sometimes costly, problems. These problems can include lawsuits for mistakes that damage people or businesses, but even small mistakes can cause a loss of reputation for the publication. The loss of reputation is often the more significant motivating factor for journalists.

Fact-checkers verify that the names, dates, and facts in an article or book are correct. For example, they may contact a person who is quoted in a proposed news article and ask the person whether this quotation is correct, or how to spell the person's name. Fact-checkers are primarily useful in catching accidental mistakes; they are not guaranteed safeguards against those who wish to commit journalistic frauds.

=== As a career ===
Professional fact-checkers have generally been hired by newspapers, magazines, and book publishers, probably starting in the early 1920s with the creation of Time magazine in the United States, though they were not originally called "fact-checkers". Fact-checkers may be aspiring writers, future editors, or freelancers engaged other projects; others are career professionals.

Historically, the field was considered women's work, and from the time of the first professional American fact-checker through at least the 1970s, the fact-checkers at a media company might be entirely female or primarily so.

The number of people employed in fact-checking varies by publication. Some organizations have substantial fact-checking departments. For example, The New Yorker magazine had 16 fact-checkers in 2003 and the fact-checking department of the German weekly magazine Der Spiegel counted 70 staff in 2017. Others may hire freelancers per piece or may combine fact-checking with other duties. Magazines are more likely to use fact-checkers than newspapers. Television and radio programs rarely employ dedicated fact-checkers, and instead expect others, including senior staff, to engage in fact-checking in addition to their other duties.

=== Checking original reportage ===
Stephen Glass began his journalism career as a fact-checker. He went on to invent fictitious stories, which he submitted as reportage, and which fact-checkers at The New Republic (and other weeklies for which he worked) never flagged. Michael Kelly, who edited some of Glass's concocted stories, blamed himself, rather than the fact-checkers, saying: "Any fact-checking system is built on trust ... If a reporter is willing to fake notes, it defeats the system. Anyway, the real vetting system is not fact-checking but the editor."

=== Alumni of the role ===
The following is a list of individuals for whom it has been reported, reliably, that they have played such a fact-checking role at some point in their careers, often as a stepping point to other journalistic endeavors, or to an independent writing career:

- Susan Choi – American novelist
- Anderson Cooper – Television anchorman
- William Gaddis – American novelist
- Virginia Heffernan – The New York Times television critic
- Roger Hodge – Former editor, Harper's Magazine
- David D. Kirkpatrick – The New York Times reporter
- Sean Wilsey – McSweeney's Editor and memoirist

== See also ==
- Cherry picking
- Confirmation bias
- Copy editing – Improving the formatting, style and accuracy of text
- Firehose of falsehood
- Gell-Mann amnesia effect - The tendency that readers fact-check content regarding topics on which they are experts, but blindly believe other content
- Journalism – Production of reports on current events
  - Investigative journalism – form of journalism where reporters deeply investigate a single topic
  - Watchdog journalism – Journalist that plays an oversight role towards government, industry and society
- Media literacy
- Metascience
- Section 230 of the Communications Decency Act
