= Cam Kashani =

Iranian-American entrepreneur, coach, speaker, and advisor

Cameron Kashani (Cam Kashani)
- Born: July 12, 1981 (age 45); Tehran, Iran
- Education: California State University-Northridge; Loyola Marymount University
- Occupations: Entrepreneur, speaker, advisor
- Website: camkashani.com

Cameron Kashani is an Iranian-American entrepreneur, coach, speaker, and advisor. Kashani is the co-founder of a document delivery portal startup, a coworking space for tech startups and entrepreneurs, and a leadership development program for women. Kashani is also the host of an eponymously titled podcast called The Cam Kashani Show.

== Early life and education ==
Kashani was born July 12, 1981, in Tehran, Iran. She received a bachelor's degree in marketing and entrepreneurship from California State University-Northridge, and an MBA in entrepreneurship and marketing from Loyola Marymount University.

== Career ==
Kashani co-founded a start up, MedMinister.com, a web-based document delivery portal.

She was also the co-founder of Coloft, a coworking space with a focus on technology, startups and entrepreneurs, that hosted Uber LA, Instacart, Fullscreen, and Ziprecruiter. After splitting with her co-founder, Kashani left Coloft and cofounded COACCEL, a leadership development program for women.

She has spoken globally on topics including entrepreneurism, technology, and women's issues. Kashani is a speaker with the US State Department, in a program to prevent terrorism called IIP. She was a special advisor of Innovation and Entrepreneurship to the US Ambassador to Kuwait. She was on the Innovation Council for SoCal FWD.us, and Advisor for the Bixel Exchange.

Kashani is also host her own podcast..

== Personal life ==
Kashani is married and mother to twin boys.
