= Ueb =

UEB or Ueb may refer to:

- União dos Escoteiros do Brasil, the Union of Brazilian Scouts
- Unified English Braille
- The Universal edit button
- The Université européenne de Bretagne, a confederation of universities in France
- The Uganda Electricity Board (see Energy in Uganda)
- The theoretical 192nd element, unennbium (Ueb)
- The United Effort Brotherhood, a fictional group in the show Big Love
