= Host Europe Group =

1997–2017 UK-based web domain and hosting company

- Type: Subsidiary
- Industry: Communications and Media
- Founded: 1997 (as GX Networks)
- Headquarters: The Old Vinyl Factory, Hayes, United Kingdom
- Products: Website hosting
- Parent: GoDaddy
- Website: www.heg.com

Host Europe Group (formerly Pipex Communications plc and GX Networks) was an American-owned, European-located website hosting, email and domain name registrar company headquartered Hayes, West London. Founded as GX Networks in 1997, the company was renamed Pipex Communications plc following its takeover of Pipex in 2003. It reverted to the GX Networks name following its sale of Pipex in 2008 before being renamed Host Europe Group in 2009. It was acquired by American hosting company GoDaddy in 2017, and as of 2019 its name was in the process of being phased out.

== Brands ==
Through a series of acquisitions and (de)mergers GX Networks (and subsequently Webfusion) is known through various brands. Since 2009, the company has consolidated its trading under the brand names: 123-reg (The UK's largest domain name registrar, with more than 3 million names registered and 1.3 million websites hosted), Heart Internet (UK hosting), Tsohost (UK hosting), Host Europe (German hosting), Webfusion (Spanish hosting), RedCoruna (Spanish hosting), Mesh Digital and Domainbox (international domain names).

== History ==
Host Europe was founded by Cologne-based entrepreneur Uwe Braun. It began by offering internet services to corporations and began trading under the GX name in 1997. It believed that it had developed the first transatlantic IP backbone running native ATM. Webfusion originally started out with major Network Access Points in Washington and San Jose in the US, London's LINX and Stockholm in Europe.

With various changes of ownership, the company's name has changed several times, taking on the Pipex name following its takeover in 2003. Following restructuring in 2009, the company trades under the Webfusion name in the UK, as part of HEG (formerly Host Europe Group), and is based in Hayes in West London. As of 2015, HEG claimed to be Europe's largest privately owned hosting company.

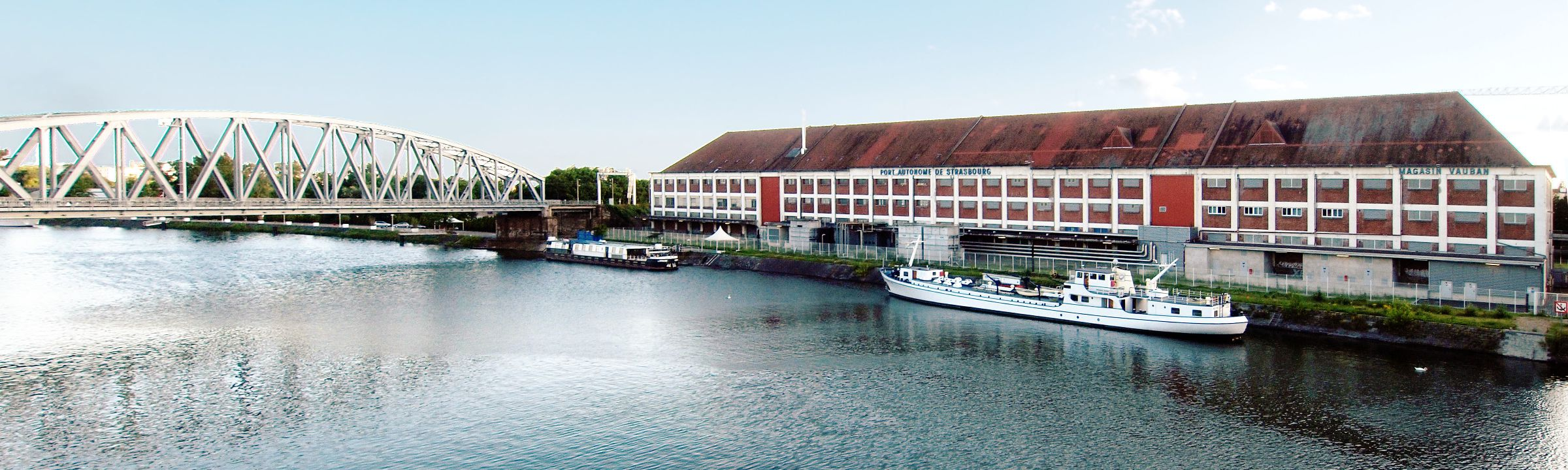
HEG data center in Strasbourg, France

=== Timeline ===
- April 1997 – Internet Technology Group (ITG) announces the acquisition of Xara Networks Limited in a deal worth £2.65 million.
- September 1997 – Xara Networks, a subsidiary of Internet Technology Group (ITG), relaunched as GX Networks.
- January 2000 – GX Networks became part of Concentric Network.
- September 2000 – Concentric Network merged with Nextlink to form XO Communications.
- 2001 – The UK arm of XO Europe was sold off to form Transigent Limited.
- September 2002 – Zipcom plc acquires Transigent Limited (formerly XO Limited), the parent company of GX Networks, in a deal worth approximately £10m.
- October 2002 – Zipcom plc acquired the entire share capital of Transigent Limited, the parent company of GX Networks.
- March 2003 – Zipcom plc changed its name to GX Networks plc.
- July 2003 – GX Networks acquires two more telecoms businesses, XTML Limited ("XTML") and Compulink Information eXchange Limited ("CIX"), which were previously part of the Telenor Business Holdings UK Limited Group ("Telenor").
- September 2003 – GX Networks buy Firstnet Ltd (owners of Liberty Broadband aka Tele2 UK)
- October 2003 – GX Networks plc became Pipex Communications plc to maintain the PIPEX brand after a buyout for £55m.
- April 2004 – Pipex Communications Plc acquires Host Europe Plc, an AIM-listed hosting solutions provider to the UK and Germany, for £31 million
- May 2005 – Pipex Communications acquires Donhost
- 2006 – Pipex Communications acquires Supanetwork, better known as SupaNames, for £2.2 million.
- March 2008 – Due to Pipex Broadband being sold to Tiscali (now Talk Talk), the company known as Pipex Communications UK Ltd reverts to GX Networks Ltd.
- October 2009 – Further internal re-structuring by Oakley Capital (Owner of GX Networks) after selling Vialtus Solutions and further consolidating the brands of GX Networks by renaming the company Host Europe Group, and the UK business after the hosting branch of the firm Webfusion Limited
- March 2010 – Host Europe Group acquires Virtualization firm Vanager
- September 2010 – Host Europe Group acquired by Montagu Private Equity
- March 2011 – Host Europe Group acquires Dynamic-net.ch AG
- August 2011 – Host Europe Group acquires Heart Internet Ltd
- January 2012 – Host Europe Group acquires Spanish web host RedCoruna
- May 2012 – Dynamic-net rebrands to Host Europe Suisse
- May 2012 – Host Europe Group acquires Mesh Digital Ltd
- July 2013 – Host Europe Group is acquired by Cinven.
- Oct 2013 – Host Europe Group acquires Telefónica Online Services
- Oct 2013 – Host Europe Group acquires domainFACTORY
- Aug 2014 – Host Europe Group acquires Sign-Up.to
- Nov 2014 – Host Europe Group becomes HEG
- Dec 2014 – HEG acquires intergenia AG (with subsidiaries Plusserver, Server4you, and Serverloft)
- Oct 2015 – HEG acquires Paragon Internet Group
- Dec 2016 – GoDaddy acquires HEG for €1.69 billion. The full list of HEG brands in 2017 can be found here.
- Apr 2024 – GoDaddy Divests Heart Internet
