= Top Level Design =

American domain name registrar

Top Level Design LLC
- Type: Private
- Founded: Florida, U.S. (2012)
- Founders: Ray King; Peter Brual
- Headquarters: U.S.
- Services: Domain name registrar
- Website: toplevel.design

Top Level Design is a company in the United States and parent company of the domain name registrar Porkbun LLC. The company was also a former domain name registry for several generic top-level domains, including .wiki, .ink, and .gay, until they were sold to GoDaddy Registry.

Ray King serves as Top Level Design's chief executive officer.

== History ==
Top Level Design was founded in 2012 by Portland entrepreneur Ray King after he stepped down as chief executive officer of AboutUs, a company he founded in 2006. King partnered with his brother-in-law and investor Peter Brual, who served as an advisor to AboutUs. Top Level Design was created to become a domain name registry for multiple generic top-level domains. In 2012, domain industry websites reported that the company had applied for ten generic top-level domains: .art, .blog, .design, .gay, .group, .ink, .llc, .photography, .style and .wiki. King later revealed that, because the company began as a family project, the generic top-level domains applied to by Top Level Design reflect both personal and business interests. Industry sources also confirmed that CentralNic would serve as Top Level Design's backend registry provider and Iron Mountain Incorporated would provide escrow services. The company's applications were further confirmed by The Oregonian and Portland Business Journal in April 2013. In an interview published by The Oregonian, King expressed his hope that Top Level Design would "help shape [the] new era" of top-level domains, saying they were "going to change the complexion of the Internet, at least the naming complexion of the Internet, quite a bit."

Top Level Design was the domain name registry for several top-level domains including .wiki, .ink and .design, until the company sold these domains to GoDaddy Registry in April 2023.

=== .wiki ===
On November 7, 2013, ICANN and Top Level Design entered into a "Registry Agreement", officially allowing the company to operate as the registry for .wiki. ICANN and Top Level Design entered into a "Registry Agreement" for the .ink domain on December 5, 2013. Both generic top-level domains were uncontested. Following the acquisitions, King told CMSWire, "You can generalize that neither [.wiki or .ink] will be one of the biggest [g]TLDs because strings like .art, .music and .blog all received multiple applications". However, he continued, many people "from within [the domain] industry tell me that .wiki is their dark horse for a successful [g]TLD," because ".wiki" describes the site format. "So, when I go to craftbeer.wiki, I can expect a vibrant site with passionate folks discussing all things relevant to brewing beer. This is not the case with craftbeer.com or craftbeer.guru, where you could be accessing a storefront, a blog, a brewery tourguide or any number of things."

In January 2014, .wiki was named one of the "Top 10 gTLDs to Watch in 2014" by ClickZ for having the "potential to provide great secure, shared workspaces for companies large and small". By mid-March, Top Level Design had signed agreements with more than 120 domain name registrars to retail .wiki names. It was announced in May that the Wikimedia Foundation, the non-profit organization which hosts Wikipedia and other projects, would use "w.wiki" as a URL shortener. The Foundation also endorsed Top Level Design's proposal to ICANN's Registry Services Evaluation Process to unblock 179 two-letter strings representing language codes (all two-character strings are blocked under ICANN's standard Registry Agreement). wiki domain registrations were available to only trademark holders until May 5; they became available to the general public on May 26, 2014. According to Domain Name Wire, more than 3,000 .wiki domains were registered on the first day of general availability.

=== .ink ===
The .ink generic top-level domain caters to the printing, publishing and tattoo industries, and individuals in involved with ink, including typographers and artists. It has been called a "niche name with multiple connotations". King has said of the extension, which he believes will also appeal to bloggers, design studios and writers: "Any of those companies or people that are using ink to put their message out in the work. It's signifying permanence. There is no reason not to get a name that more accurately describes your business, including of course ink makers." The generic top-level domain launched on June 23, 2014. King, with assistance from two heavily tattooed models, literally "pressed the launch button" to promote .ink at the ICANN 50 conference in London. In April 2015, The Domains reported that less than 50% of .ink domains were parked.

=== .design ===
In September 2014, Top Level Design outbid six other applicants in a private auction for the domain .design. It has since been transferred to GoDaddy Registry in April 2021.

=== .gay ===
The .gay generic top-level domain became available to the general public in September 2020.

=== .tattoo ===
The .tattoo generic top-level domain was originally managed by Uniregistry but was transferred to Top Level Design in May 2022.

== See also ==
- History of wikis
- List of Internet top-level domains
