= Elissa Murphy =

American software engineer

Elissa E. Murphy is an American software engineer, previously serving as the Vice President of Engineering at Google. Prior to her role at Google, she held positions as the Chief Technology Officer and Executive Vice President of Platforms at GoDaddy, and as the Vice President of Engineering at Yahoo!.

== Career ==
Murphy began her career in Product Development at Fifth-Generation Systems and Symantec. After serving as a director at Quarterdeck in 1996, she joined Microsoft in 1997, where she worked for thirteen years in various engineering management roles, including work on Windows Live.

In November 2010, Murphy transitioned to Silicon Valley, joining Yahoo! as the Vice President of Engineering in Hadoop and Cloud Services. During her time at Yahoo!, she also served as the Executive Sponsor of the Women in Technology Network.

Murphy left Yahoo! in April 2013 to join GoDaddy, where her former colleague, Blake Irving, had recently been appointed chief executive officer. At GoDaddy she served as Chief Technology Officer and Executive Vice President of Platforms, until May 2016. While there, she established the GoDaddy Women in Technology Network to promote a diverse culture.

In July 2016, Murphy joined Google as the Vice President of Engineering.

Murphy has held board positions at several technology companies. She served on the board of Inphi Corporation from 2015 to 2021, until the company's acquisition by Marvell Semiconductor. In September 2021, she was appointed to the GlobalFoundries board.

In 2018, she was named one of the "most powerful female engineers" in the United States by Business Insider.

Murphy holds several patents in the areas of distributed systems, cloud infrastructure, machine learning, and security.
