= .wiki =

Internet top-level domain

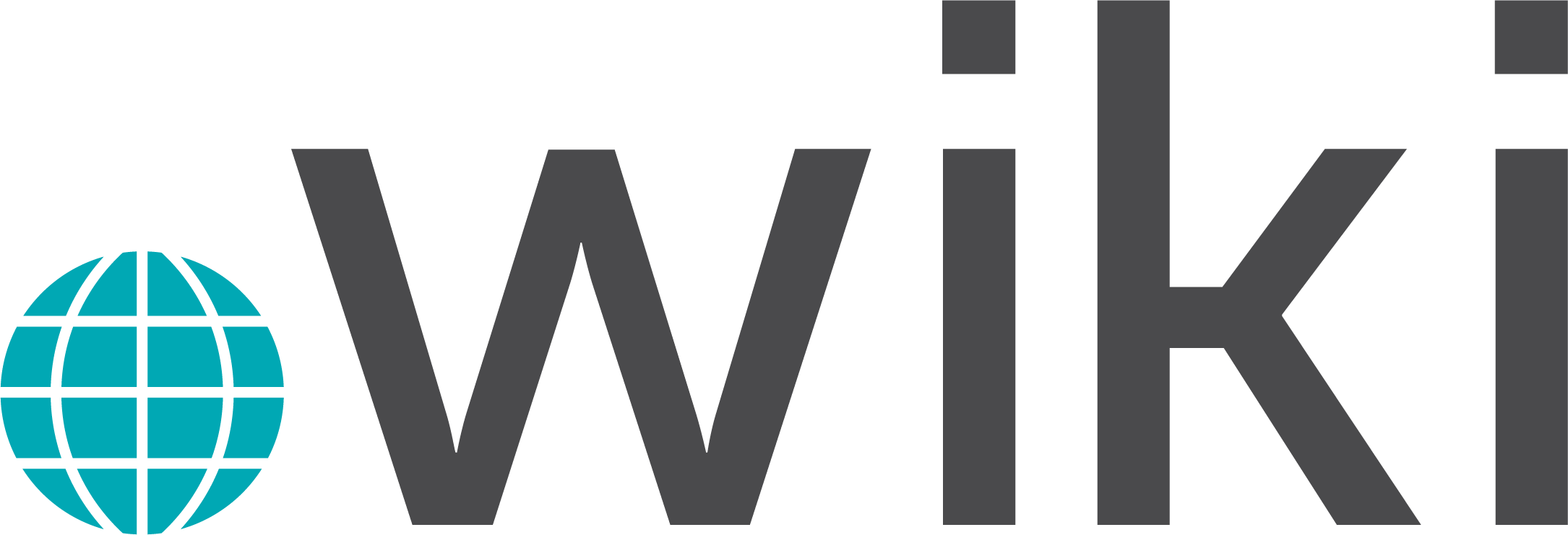
- Introduced: May 26, 2014 (general public)
- TLD type: Generic top-level domain (gTLD)
- Status: Active
- Registry: Registry Services LLC (owned by GoDaddy)
- Intended use: Wikis
- Registration restrictions: None
- Documents: ICANN registry agreement
- Registry website: domains.registry.godaddy/wiki

.wiki is a top-level domain name. Its purpose is to denote websites that are wikis. It was proposed in ICANN's New generic top-level domain (gTLD) Program, and became available to the general public on May 26, 2014. Registry Services LLC (owned by GoDaddy) is the domain name registry for the gTLD.

== History ==
In June 2012, Top Level Design submitted an application to ICANN for the .wiki gTLD. On November 7, 2013, ICANN and Top Level Design entered into a "Registry Agreement", officially allowing the company to operate as the registry for .wiki. Following the acquisition, Ray King, CEO of Top Level Design, stated many people "from within [the domain] industry tell me that .wiki is their dark horse for a successful [g]TLD," because ".wiki" describes the site format. "So, when I go to craftbeer.wiki, I can expect a vibrant site with passionate folks discussing all things relevant to brewing beer. This is not the case with craftbeer.com or craftbeer.guru, where you could be accessing a storefront, a blog, a brewery tourguide or any number of things."

In January 2014, ClickZ named .wiki one of the "Top 10 gTLDs to Watch in 2014" for having the "potential to provide great secure, shared workspaces for companies large and small". The application was delegated to the DNS root zone on February 19, 2014. By mid-March, Top Level Design had signed agreements with more than 120 domain name registrars to retail .wiki names. It was announced in May that the Wikimedia Foundation, the non-profit organization mostly known for hosting Wikipedia, would use "w.wiki" as a URL shortener. The Foundation also endorsed Top Level Design's proposal to ICANN's Registry Services Evaluation Process to unblock 179 two-letter strings representing language codes (all two-character strings are blocked under ICANN's standard Registry Agreement).

.wiki domain registrations were available to only trademark holders until May 5; they became available to the general public on May 26, 2014. According to Domain Name Wire, more than 3,000 .wiki domains were registered on the first day of general availability.

As part of the gTLD's launch, Top Level Design and YouGov released a report which concluded that nearly half of consumers in the United Kingdom and the United States have "little to no opportunity" to collaborate with their favorite brands online, and prefer brands that make online collaboration available to them. An additional fifteen percent of U.K. consumers wished they could collaborate with their favorite brands on future products. Finally, the report said nearly a quarter of U.K. and U.S. consumers want companies to solicit their ideas for future products and would contribute to a branded wiki "if they could make a difference to an organisation, brand, service or community they feel passionately about". King acknowledged his interest in promoting collaboration between companies and consumers, given the collaborative nature of wikis and Top Level Design's acquisition of the .wiki gTLD. He said of the study's findings:

Consumers and businesses alike have long recognised the power and potential that the internet has to improve the products and services businesses offer, creating a better two-way dialogue between customers and their favourite brands... In reality, this research shows that most consumers feel that the opportunity to collaborate with most companies they love still doesn't yet exist.

In July 2015, .wiki was included in a list of the "Top 20 Best New gTLDs Based on Quality", based on data gathered from more than 20,000 developed websites on new gTLD domains, as part of Globe Runner's New gTLD SEO Power Rankings Index.

In June 2023, the .wiki registry was transferred from Top Level Design to GoDaddy Registry.

== Purpose ==
In its 2012 application, Top Level Design stated that the purpose of the .wiki top-level domain would be "to create a designated Internet space for wikis. This [gTLD] will clearly identify wikis from among the millions of other websites populating the Internet, and allow Internet users to easily find wikis relevant to their interests. Wiki websites are a growing phenomenon on the Internet and an innovative, easy-to-use peer-production method of creating and presenting information. They are generally open and editable and often community-driven; furthermore, individual wikis and the wiki platform are in constant flux in much the same way that the Internet as a whole is in flux. Wikis, like the broader Internet, are repositories of information that depend on each individual user to create value; they are meeting points and revolutionary ways to share ideas and knowledge; and they are both set to be expanded through the implementation of ICANN's New gTLD Program, and a .wiki [gTLD] specifically. We believe a .wiki [gTLD] is an intuitive and necessary addition to the collection of new gTLDs to be added as a result of the New gTLD Program."

== See also ==
- .design, another top-level domain operated by Top Level Design
- List of Internet top-level domains
