= .gay =

Internet top-level domain

- Introduced: September 16, 2020 (general public)
- TLD type: Generic top-level domain (gTLD)
- Status: Active
- Registry: Registry Services LLC (owned by GoDaddy)
- Intended use: LGBT community
- Registry website: https://www.ohhey.gay/

.gay is a top-level domain name. It was proposed in ICANN's New generic top-level domain (gTLD) Program, and became available to the general public in September 2020. Top Level Design was the initial domain name registry for the string. As of 2023, Registry Services LLC (owned by GoDaddy) became the domain name registry.

== History ==
=== Creation and contention ===
By 2011, the groups Dot Gay Alliance and dotgay LLC had expressed interest in operating the generic top-level domain (gTLD), which became one of approximately 2,000 new gTLDs formally requested in 2012. The .gay gTLD was one of 84 that received applications in the "community-based category". Some officials of conservative Arab nations opposed creation of the gTLD. In 2012, the Saudi Arabian government objected to use of .gay domains, alongside the .baby, .bar, .casino, .islam, .sex., and .wine gTLDs and others. The Saudi communications authority known as the Communications and Information Technology Commission said .gay domains "would promote homosexuality and would be offensive to 'many societies and cultures'". In August, The Verge's Kimber Streams said "several organized campaigns and petitions were filed against .sex and .gay domains in attempt to communicate large numbers of opposition."

In April 2012, Top Level Design and three other applicants, including dotgay LLC, had applied to operate the gTLD. In a guest column published by the LGBTQ publication PQ Monthly in October 2013, Top Level Design's CEO Ray King said he was inspired to apply for .gay by his late gay brother-in-law Clyde and other family members. King outlined why he wanted the gTLD to remain open in order to benefit the global LGBT community, using three main concepts: "Freedom of Choice", meaning the purpose of gTLDs like .gay and .lgbt should not be defined by gatekeepers; "Freedom of Speech", or not allowing censorship of content appearing on .gay domains; and the "Freedom to Register", suggesting there should not be a barrier to authenticate oneself as LGBTQ to register a .gay domain. In the latter concept, King argued against the need for domain purchasers to become a member of an "Authentication Partner" (LGBT organizations such as the International Lesbian, Gay, Bisexual, Trans and Intersex Association or Human Rights Campaign), who would be required to create usernames and passwords for all of their members. According to King, "This means higher costs, disenfranchising many potential registrants such as youth and people in developing countries and also, forced identification, which to some may be anywhere from distasteful to outright dangerous. Further, there are many LGBTQ folks who simply do not wish to participate in formal organizations." The column concluded by asking community members to express their support or opposition of an open .gay gTLD.

In November 2013, Q Center, an LGBT community center in Portland, Oregon, US, published arguments by King on behalf of Top Level Design and Jamie Baxter on behalf of dotgay LLC; both groups expressed why they should be the registry for .gay, and were seeking community support. Slate magazine also covered the .gay contention. dotgay LLC's community application was denied by ICANN's Community Priority Evaluation committee in October 2014. The decision was appealed and denied multiple times. The main reason for the denial was that the TLD ".gay" did not match defined dotgay LLC's stated community of LGBTQIA, and that the organizations in support were not necessarily representative of the global population; "There is no single such organization recognized by the defined community as representative of the community".

In 2016, in an opinion piece published by The Wall Street Journal, L. Gordon Crovitz wrote: "[ICANN] also refuses to award the .gay domain to community groups representing gay people around the world. [ICANN's] ombudsman recently urged his group to 'put an end to this long and difficult issue' by granting the domain. [ICANN] prefers to earn larger fees by putting the .gay domain up for auction among for-profit domain companies."

=== Launch ===
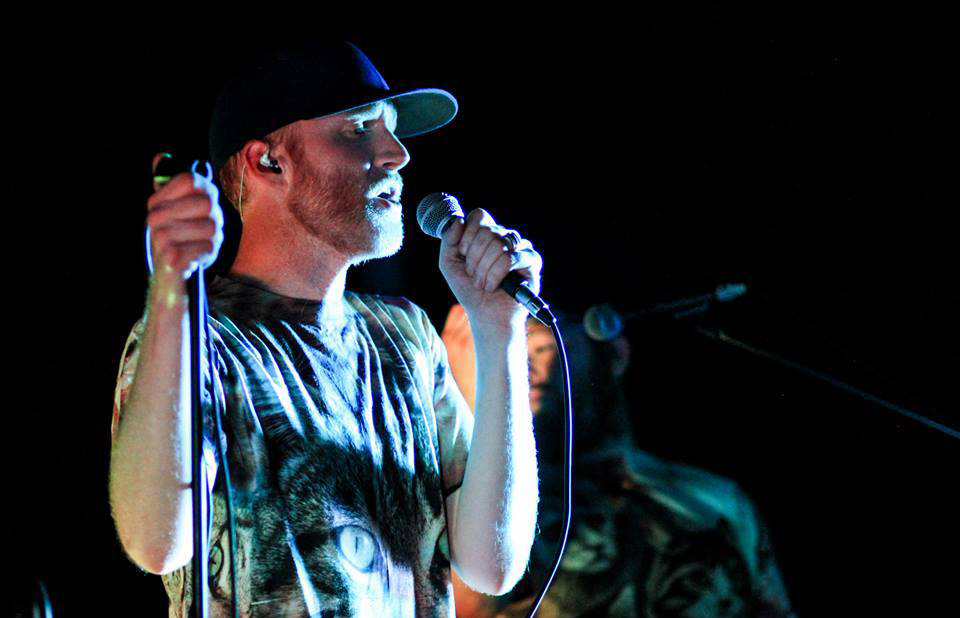
Logan Lynn (pictured performing in 2013) helped launch the gTLD .gay

Top Level Design was recognized by ICANN as the .gay registry on May 23, 2019, after competing applicants dropped their bids.

The "Sunrise II" phase for registration began on April 6, 2020. Following a delay because of the COVID-19 pandemic, during which Top Level Design offered to provide a limited number of domains to groups "working to foster digital Pride", domains became available to the general public on September 16, 2020. Twenty percent of registration revenue will benefit CenterLink and GLAAD; approximately $75,000 was raised, as of late September 2020.

The web series The Library, which explores LGBT slang and other concepts, debuted alongside the gTLD's launch. Logan Lynn, who helped with the launch, said the 2020 release commemorated 50 years since the first pride parade. Domains have been registered by Roxane Gay, Grindr, Instinct, Billie Jean King, PFLAG, and George Takei.

=== Social media campaigns ===
Since its creation, .gay has launched a number of pro-LGBTQ social media and web campaigns. During the monkeypox outbreak in summer 2022, the site highlighted resources available to members of the LGBT community. Similarly, .gay has also launched celebrations for International Transgender Day of Visibility, Pride Month, National Coming Out Day, and more. Notable people who .gay has profiled since its creation include Chris Mosier, Angelica Ross, and Sophie.

== Harassment protections ==
The gTLD offers harassment protections. According to Willamette Week's Andrew Jankowski, "The .gay rights protections policy gives users a clear guide on making sites queer-friendly, while outlining behavior that gets would-be trolls banned from misusing the extension."

== See also ==
- List of Internet top-level domains
