= .design =

Internet top-level domain used by designing companies

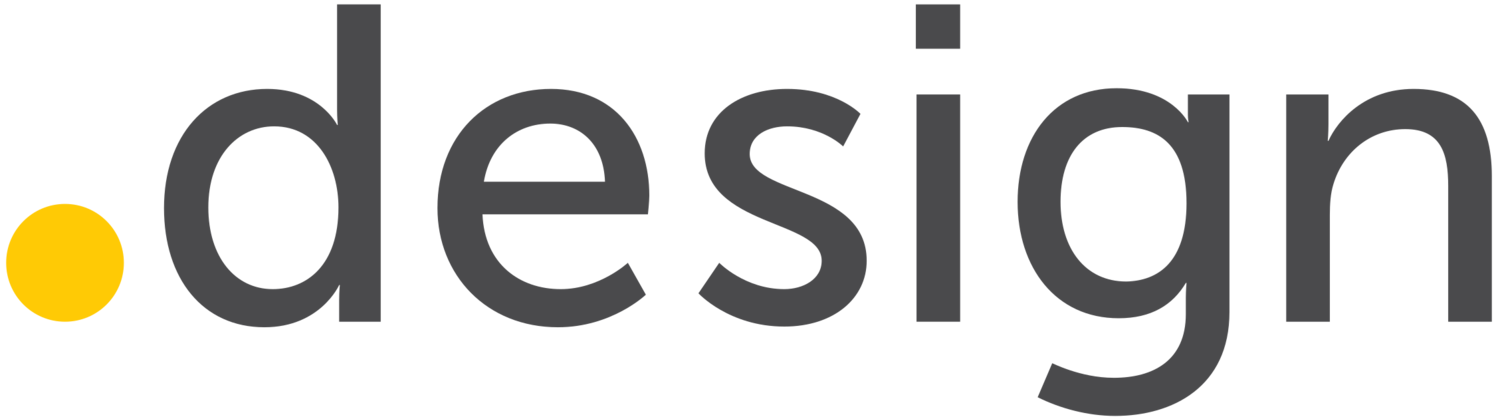
- Introduced: May 12, 2015 (general public)
- TLD type: Generic top-level domain (gTLD)
- Status: Active
- Registry: Registry Services LLC (owned by GoDaddy)
- Intended use: Designers, design-focused companies and organizations
- Registration restrictions: None
- Dispute policies: UDRP
- DNSSEC: yes
- Registry website: domains.registry.godaddy/design

.design is a generic top-level domain name in the Domain Name System of the Internet. It was proposed in ICANN's new generic top-level domain (gTLD) program, and became available to the general public on May 12, 2015. Top Level Design was the domain name registry for the string until April 2021, when it was transferred to GoDaddy Registry.

== History ==
In September 2014, Portland, Oregon-based Top Level Design (TLD) won the right to operate the .design top-level domain after beating out six other applicants in a private auction. According to TLD's CEO Ray King, winning the auction was "very important" and one of the company's top priorities, evidenced by its name. He told Domain Name Wire, "Think of all the things that require design. Design permeates all aspects of culture.". design domain registrations became available to the general public on May 12, 2015. According to The Domains, more than 5,200 .design domains were registered on the first day of general availability.

CentralNic provides backend services through an exclusive distribution agreement and shares in the global revenues from .design domain names. Ben Crawford, CentralNic's CEO, said of the top-level domain, "It has impressive commercial potential, and it will be adopted more quickly than many other TLDs as it caters, among many other groups, to one of the best-informed professions on new Internet developments – website designers".

Ahead of .design's launch, King said of the gTLD:

Design has always been fundamental to the way people, companies and products present themselves, and since the elegance of the Apple revolution there has been a conscious embrace of how design is a lot more than just how a product or service looks, but a fundamental carrier of one's message. Beyond that, design is what I call a 'horizontal-vertical', in that it is a broad term, but not generic like .web or .online. It touches on many clear vertical markets such as graphic design, interior design, lighting design, web design, fashion design and many more. These are all distinct markets whose survival depends on them being ahead of the curve and defining future trends — .design does just that.

== See also ==
- List of Internet top-level domains
- .wiki, another top-level domain previously operated by Top Level Design
