= .club =

Internet top-level domain

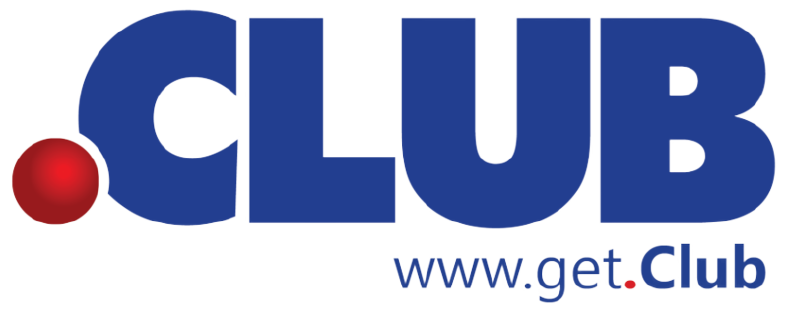
- Introduced: May 7, 2014 (general public)
- TLD type: Generic top-level domain (gTLD)
- Status: Active
- Registry: Registry Services LLC (owned by GoDaddy)
- Registry website: get.club

.club, often stylized as .CLUB and sometimes dot-club, is a top-level domain (TLD). It was proposed in ICANN's new generic top-level domain (gTLD) program, and became available to the general public on May 7, 2014. GoDaddy is the domain name registry for the string.

== Acquisition and promotion ==
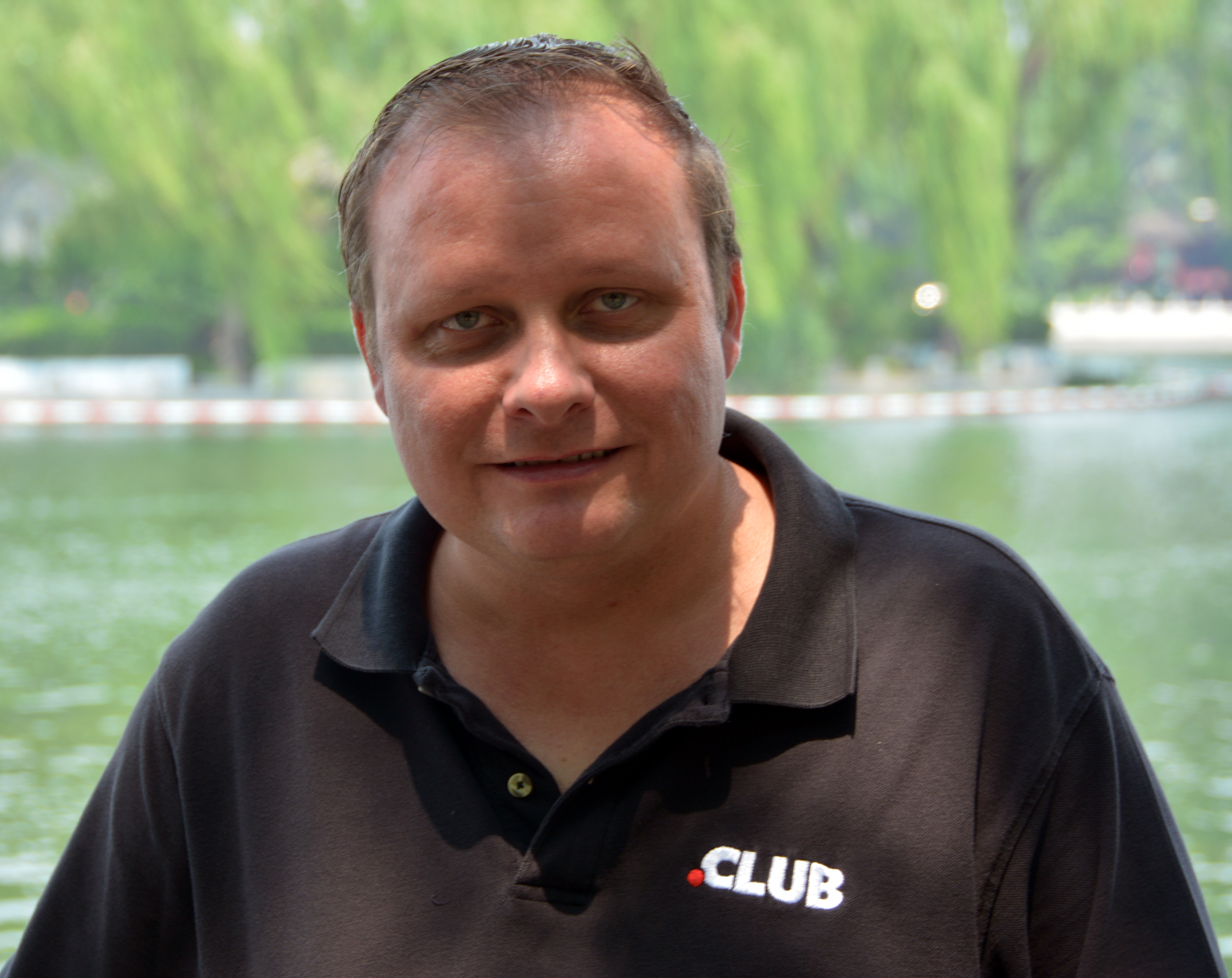
Colin Campbell, CEO of .Club Domains, LLC

In June 2013, .Club Domains, LLC acquired the .club gTLD through a private auction after raising $7 million from 27 individual investors. Colin Campbell, the company's chief executive officer, declined to reveal the final auction price, citing confidentiality agreements. club was the first new gTLD acquired via private auction. Unsuccessful applicants competing for the gTLD were Donuts and the Merchant Law Group LLP.

== Success ==
According to The Domains, "Those now using a web address ending in .club include brands, celebrities, sports figures, innovative entrepreneurs and startups, associations, and clubs around the globe... tens of thousands of clubs, business and individuals are actively using a .club address for their web presence, from Rotary Clubs, to school clubs, to passionate bloggers." Prominent individuals using the extension include rapper 50 Cent, professional basketball player Tyler Johnson, and Indian cricket star Virat Kohli.

== See also ==
- List of Internet top-level domains
