= ICANNWiki =

Wiki about ICANN and Internet Governance

- Founded: 2005; 21 years ago
- Type: 501(c)(3) organization
- Purpose: Organize information about ICANN and Internet Governance
- Headquarters: Portland, Oregon, United States
- Key people: Raymond King (founder)
- Website: icannwiki.org

ICANNWiki is a not-for-profit organization founded in 2005, dedicated to supporting the Internet community's collaborative development of wiki articles on ICANN and Internet Governance-related topics. It currently counts with over 8,500 articles, and has as its mission to provide neutral, third-party information, being an open platform governed by wiki values. ICANNWiki is not part of ICANN, being an entirely separate organization.

== History ==
ICANNWiki was originally founded by Raymond King in 2005, with help from Brandon CS Sanders and John Stanton, with the belief that a public wiki could be of benefit to the greater ICANN community. The project debuted at ICANN 24 in Vancouver, British Columbia. The wiki was rebooted in 2010, with a focus on improving articles and standards.

== Work ==
ICANNWiki is known within the Internet Governance community for innovating in its outreach, with caricatures of ICANN meeting attendants, decks of playing cards featuring community members, and recurring Edit-a-Thon events. ICANN itself has collaborated with the project in varied efforts of outreach and engagement, carried out in different regions of the world.
