= Ray King (entrepreneur) =

American entrepreneur

Raymond King
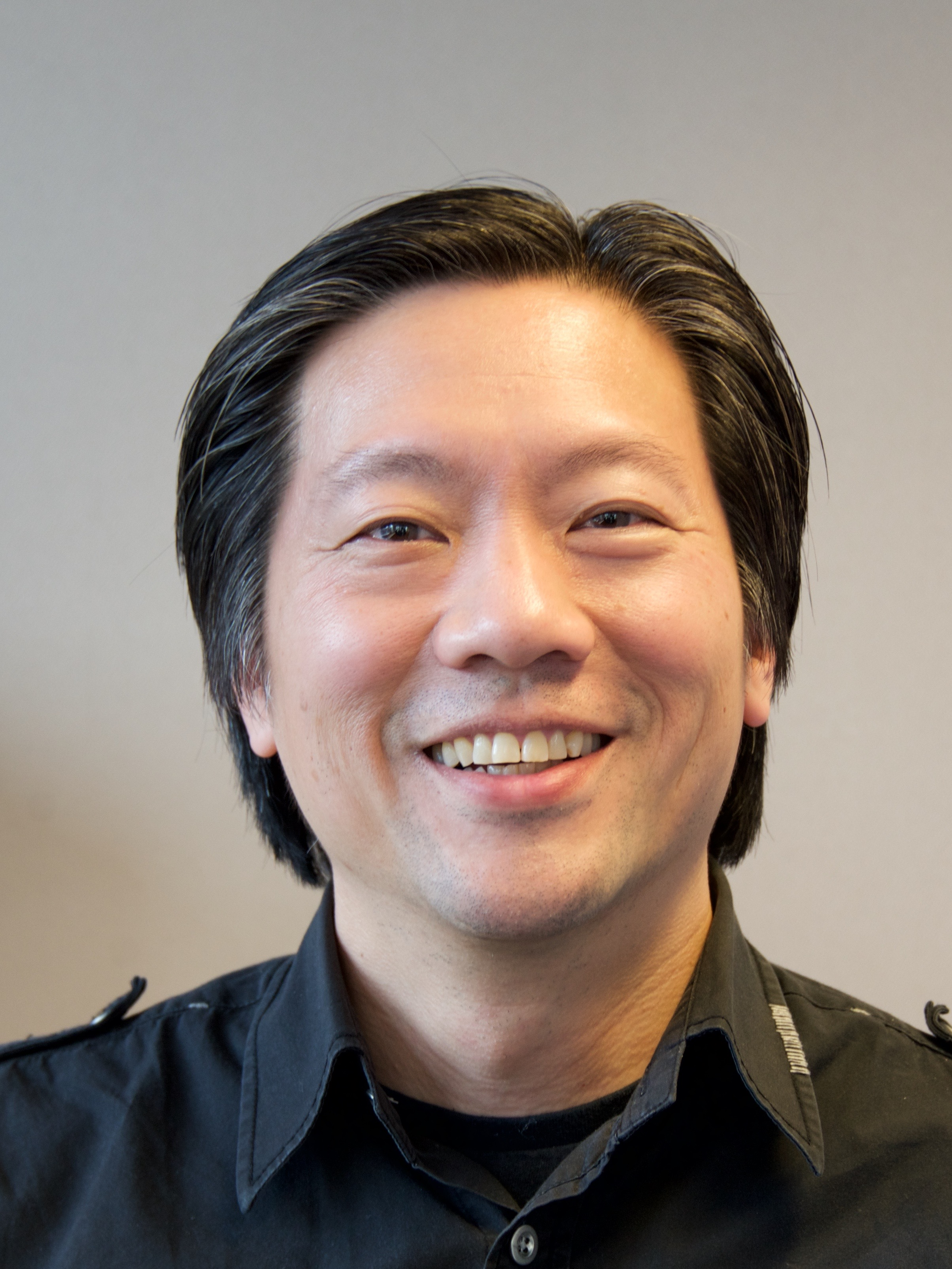
- Born: 1964 (age 61–62)
- Education: Massachusetts Institute of Technology (1982–1984)
- Occupation: Entrepreneur

Raymond "Ray" King (born 1964) is an American entrepreneur and co-founder of companies including AboutUs.org and Top Level Design, as well as the ICANNWiki project.

== Early life, education and career ==
King was born in 1964 to Kenneth, an architect, and Yien-Koo. He graduated from The Bronx High School of Science in June 1982. He began his career in technology as a teenager establishing The Computer Workshop, with 17 of his friends, which offered computing classes at his apartment and Manhattan's Grand Central Terminal. In an interview with The New York Times, King said:

We began thinking about what we wanted to do when we left school. We had taken computer courses, and we knew enough about them to know that we could develop something ... We designed a sign offering classes in basic computer language, how computers could be used for small business and the basic software, and we began putting them up on lampposts and in grocery stores near our homes.

The venture, which taught people how to use Apple II and IBM PCs, earned King $60,000. He later recalled: "We approached people at Grand Central Station and convinced them to come take our courses. We were written up in The New York Times. I made enough money to pay for one year of college at MIT." King remained enrolled at the Massachusetts Institute of Technology for eighteen months studying computer science before leaving in 1984 to start Semaphore Inc., a company that sold accounting, billing, and project management software to architecture and engineering firms. The company received $4 million in invested capital and grew to 100 employees in four offices by the time it was sold to Virginia-based DelTek Inc. in 2000 for nearly $12 million.

After relocating to Portland, Oregon to live in a city where he could bike to work, and enjoy a higher quality of living, he founded the secondary market domain name company SnapNames in 2000. The company specialized in "snapping up" expired domain names, which occurred "all the time", according to King. It took in $7.8 million in invested capital and partnered with several of the largest domain name registrars. King was appointed chief operating officer in 2001. He left SnapNames in 2005 to start his next business venture, AboutUs. By 2006, SnapNames was generating gross sales of $49 million. The company sold to California-based Oversee.net in 2007 for $30 million.

King founded AboutUs.org, a wiki Internet domain directory, in 2006. In November 2006, the company closed its initial financing round for one million dollars. In January 2009, AboutUs secured a $5 million Series A funding round from Voyager Capital, Capybara Ventures, Northwest Technology Ventures and private individuals, including angel investors Tom Holce and Irving Levin. Within three years, AboutUs employed 34 people in Portland and Lahore, Pakistan. King was chief executive officer until he stepped down in 2013.

In 2012, King co-founded Top Level Design, a domain name registry for multiple generic top-level domains, with his brother-in-law and investor Peter Brual. The registry has managed the .design, .gay, .ink, and .wiki top-level domains.

== Personal life and recognition ==
King and his wife Deneen have one daughter named Dakota and collect minimalist art. In 2000, the New York Post profiled their five-level townhouse in the West Village valued at $7.75 million. In 2009, he received the Oregon Entrepreneurs Network's annual award for individual achievement.

== Works ==
- "Online brand collaboration: turning customers into advocates". The Guardian. June 4, 2014. Archived from the original on 29 September 2015.
- "Stop, collaborate and listen: what wikis can do for brand engagement". The Wall. Haymarket Media Group. June 11, 2014. Archived from the original on 29 September 2015.
- "Google challenges GoDaddy for domain name supremacy". VentureBeat. July 4, 2014. Archived from the original on 29 September 2015.
- "The Expanding Number of Domain Names Has Benefits From .App to .Zone". Entrepreneur. Entrepreneur Media, Inc. August 21, 2014. Archived from the original on 29 September 2015.
- "Leaving .Com Behind: Using TLDs to Better Market an Online Presence". MediaPost. September 4, 2014. Archived from the original on 29 September 2015.
- "Navigating New Internet Domains". InformationWeek. UBM Tech. September 8, 2014. Archived from the original on 29 September 2015.
- "Embracing a new domain". ITProPortal. IT Pro Portal. September 8, 2014. Archived from the original on 29 September 2015.
- "Publishers Can Boost Discoverability with Newly Released Web Domains". Book Business. September 12, 2014. Archived from the original on September 14, 2014.
- "What to Do When the .Com You Want Is Taken?". Wired. Condé Nast. September 23, 2014. Archived from the original on 29 September 2015.
- "4 Reasons Why You Should Ditch '.com' for Good". Entrepreneur. May 14, 2015. Archived from the original on 29 September 2015.

== See also ==
- List of Bronx High School of Science alumni
- List of Massachusetts Institute of Technology alumni
