= 123 Reg =

British domain registrar and web hosting company

- Founded: 2000
- Headquarters: Hayes, England
- Industry: Domain Registrar; Web hosting; SSL certificates; small businesses
- Employees: 51–200 (February 2020)
- Parent: GoDaddy
- Website: www.123-reg.co.uk

123 Reg is a British domain registrar and web hosting company, founded in Britain in 2000 and now under the ultimate ownership of GoDaddy. The company claims to be the UK's largest accredited domain registrar and provides Internet services to small- and medium-sized businesses. From 2003 to 2017, 123 Reg was part of Host Europe Group (HEG). In April 2017, American hosting company GoDaddy acquired HEG for 1.69 billion euros ($1.82 billion).

== History ==
123 Reg was founded in Britain in 2000 by Jonathan and Tim Beresford-Brealey, who prior to this had also set up Webfusion Internet Solutions Ltd in 1997. In 2003, 123 Reg and Webfusion were acquired by Host Europe Group (HEG). In 2004, Host Europe Group was bought by Pipex Communications for £31.2m and 123 Reg became the UK's largest domain registrar, according to the company's parent.

In 2009, Host Europe Group organised its UK operations under the Webfusion Ltd group but kept both brands. The same year, Webfusion became the first UK web host to offer Windows Server 2008 web hosting, and the company opened a £2.5 million data centre in Leeds. Also in 2009, 123 Reg became the first UK domain registrar to have 2 million domain names on register. In 2010, Webfusion Ltd was included on The Sunday Times's list of Britain's fastest-growing private-equity backed companies, the Deloitte Buyout Track 100, and was the only hosting company on the list. In 2012, it became the first UK domain registrar to have 3 million domain names on register.

On 16 April 2016, 123 Reg admitted a major deletion of a large number of virtual private servers (VPSs) caused by an error during what should have been routine maintenance. The event deleted hundreds of websites, with users losing sites and access to data on their VPS service. By 24 April, the situation was still ongoing. During this period, 123 Reg had a further data breach, with customers being able to see the support tickets of other account holders.

In April 2017, American hosting company GoDaddy acquired 123 Reg's parent company, HEG, for 1.69 billion euros ($1.82 billion).
