= Blake Irving =

American business executive

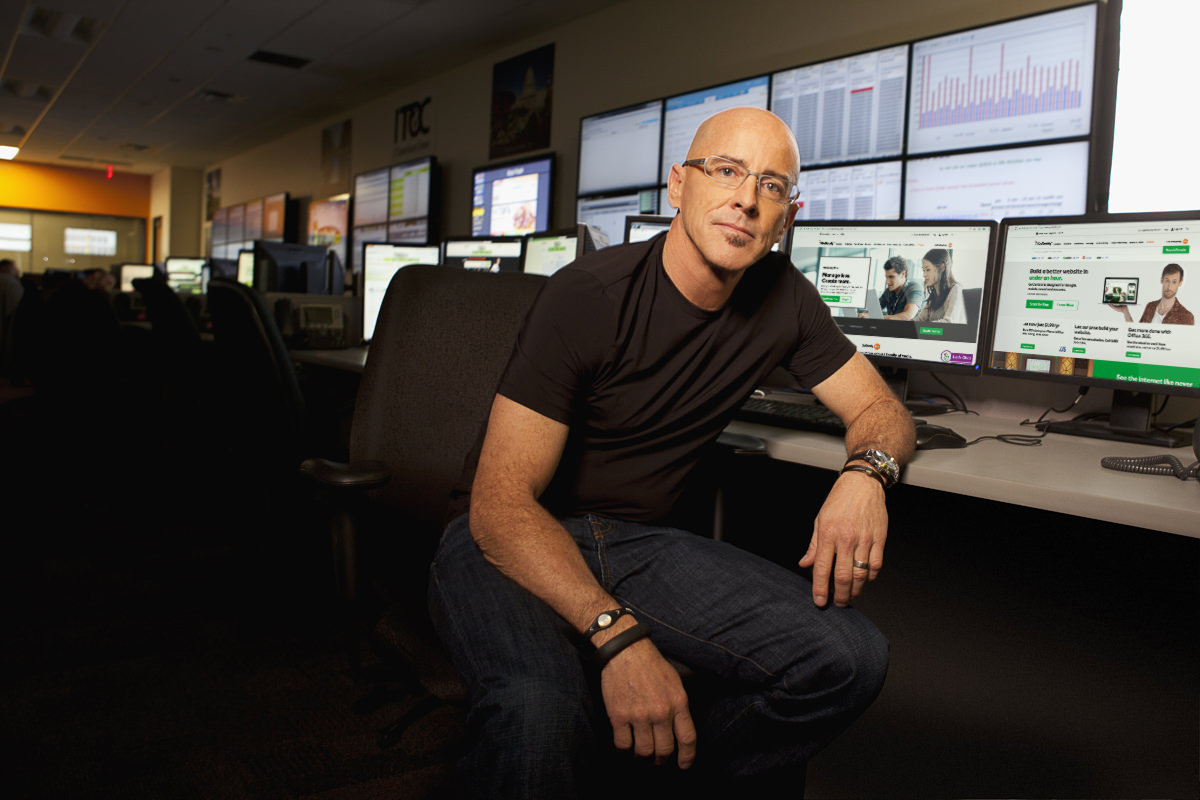
- Born: August 8, 1959 (age 67); Ohio, U.S.
- Education: MBA
- Alma mater: Pepperdine University

Blake Irving is the American former Chief Executive Officer and Board Director of GoDaddy. Before coming to GoDaddy in 2013, Blake Irving worked for Yahoo! and Microsoft where he helped develop NetMeeting, MSN Messenger, and Hotmail.

== Early life and education ==
Blake Irving was born on August 8, 1959, to James Scott Irving and Patricia Ann Irving in Ohio. Irving's father was in the FBI and consequently moved the family around the country. Irving lived with his brother, Scott, and his sisters, Lisa and Lori. Irving played the drums from the age of seven, and was an artist while attending the Newbury Park High School in Southern California. Irving is a graduate of San Diego State University and received an MBA degree from Pepperdine University. He has served as a professor at Pepperdine University Graziadio School of Business and Management, and has been named a distinguished alumnus.

== Career ==
=== Xerox ===
Irving began working at Xerox in 1981, where he provided Greek fonts for electronic typesetting. He eventually became a manager at the company's Font Support Center. Irving worked at PARC during the development of WYSIWYG technology, Irving also worked at Oki Electric Company and Compaq computer.

=== Microsoft ===
Irving was a product manager for Microsoft's telecommunications business unit in 1994, and a group manager the Personal Systems Division in 1995. In 1996, he was the group manager for the Internet Platform and Tools Division, and he would later be named Corporate Vice President. As head of the Windows Live Platform, Irving managed a $1 billion global R&D budget and oversaw development teams in the US, India, China and Europe. Irving was also Corporate Vice President of MSN Communication Services and Merchant Platforms. Irving was also a Member of Platform Group of MessageCast Inc. and was involved in overseeing other Microsoft products including NetMeeting, Outlook Express, MSN Messenger, Hotmail, Xbox Live, and other Microsoft applications.

=== Yahoo! ===
Irving worked at Yahoo! Inc. from May 2010 to April 1, 2012. He was the Chief Product Officer, and its Executive Vice President. Irving left Yahoo! during Scott Thompson's CEO-ship. While at Yahoo!, Irving was in charge of Yahoo! Mail, and specific theme-based Yahoo! sites like news, sports, and finance.

=== GoDaddy ===
Irving became Chief Executive Officer of GoDaddy in January 2013. Under Irving, the company stopped airing sexually provocative commercials it had become known for, which had fed the company's reputation for sexism. Other changes by Irving including hiring Elissa Murphy as Chief Technical Officer. Irving said he would retire from the company at the end of 2017.

=== Autodesk ===
In March 2019, Autodesk appointed Blake Irving to Board of Directors effective March 22, 2019.

=== Other activities ===
Irving was an executive producer of Code: Debugging the Gender Gap, a 2015 documentary about the lack of women and people of color in computer science.
