= RecentChangesCamp =

Unconference focused on wikis

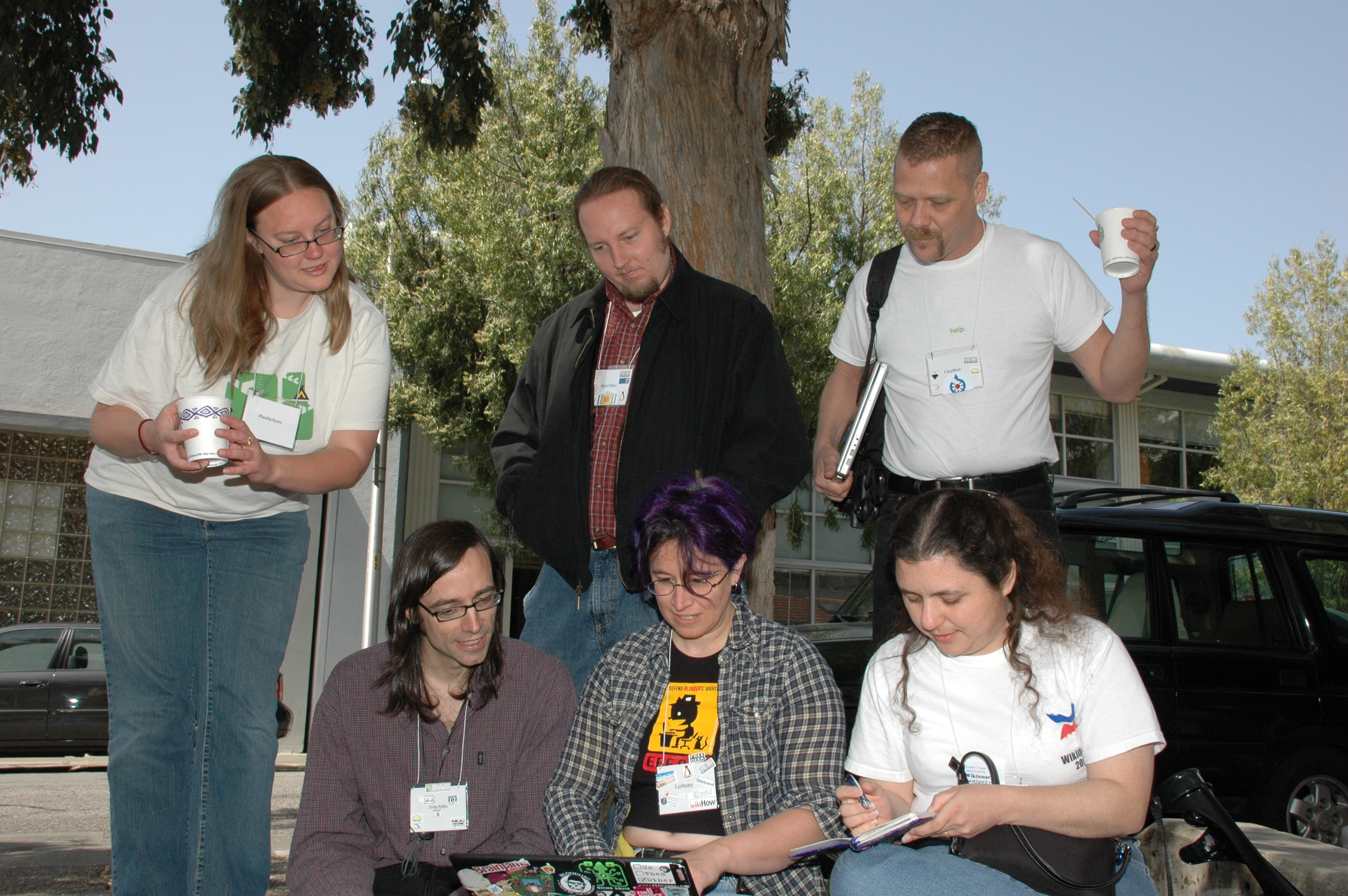
- Participants at RecentChangesCamp 2008
- Status: Defunct
- Genre: Unconference
- Frequency: Annually
- Inaugurated: February 2006
- Most recent: January 2012
- Website: recentchangescamp.org

RecentChangesCamp was an unconference focused on wikis, held from 2006 to 2012. It was named after the "recent changes" feature that is found in most wikis. RecentChangesCamp followed an Open Space model in having a program that was determined onsite by participants.

== History ==
RecentChangesCamp was conceived at WikiSym 2005 as a way to replicate online wiki collaboration in the face-to-face world, using Open Space Technology, which enables participants to create the agenda on the fly, guaranteeing that all issues that participants were willing to take responsibility for were worked on to the extent possible.

The first RecentChangesCamp was held February 3–5, 2006 in Portland, Oregon, United States, with 147 people in attendance. Participants included wiki inventor Ward Cunningham. Sponsors of the 2006 event were ICANNWiki, IBESI, OSDL, Socialtext, Atlassian and IBM.

The next RecentChangesCamp was also held in Portland, from February 2–4, 2007.

The logo of RecentChangesCamp 2007 Montreal

A few months later, another RecentChangesCamp was held in Montreal, from 18 to 20 May 2007. It was also called RoCoCoCamp, for RencOntres sur la COllaboration, la Créativité et l'autOgestion ("Meetings on Collaboration, Creativity and Self-Management"); the name was chosen to echo the "RCC" initials in "RecentChangesCamp", with more recognition of Montreal's French-speaking population. The theme of the event was "AccidentalLinking", a wiki pattern about surprising, serendipitous relationships between wiki writers and wiki pages. The event was held at the Société des Arts Technologiques (SAT) in downtown Montreal.

RecentChangesCamp 2008 took place May 9–11 in Palo Alto, California, United States, at the SocialText offices. The theme of the weekend was "Assume Good Faith", and the sponsors were AboutUs.org, Atlassian, Socialtext, Solseed, Wikia, and wikiHow.

Subsequent RecentChangesCamp events were:

- February 20–22, 2009, Portland, Oregon
- June 25–27, 2010, Montreal
- August 11, 2010, Canberra
- January 28–30, 2011, Canberra
- March 11–13, 2011, Boston
- January 20–22, 2012, Canberra

== See also ==
- Wikimania
