= ZipRecruiter =

Online employment marketplace

ZipRecruiter, Inc.
- Website type: Public
- Traded as: NYSE: ZIP
- Founded: March 14, 2010; 16 years ago
- Headquarters: Santa Monica, California
- Founders: Ian Siegel; Joe Edmonds; Ward Poulos; Will Redd
- Key people: Ian Siegel (CEO)
- Industry: Employment websites
- Revenue: ▼US$449 million (2025)
- Net income: ▼ −US$33.0 million (2025)
- Employees: 1,000
- Website: ziprecruiter.com

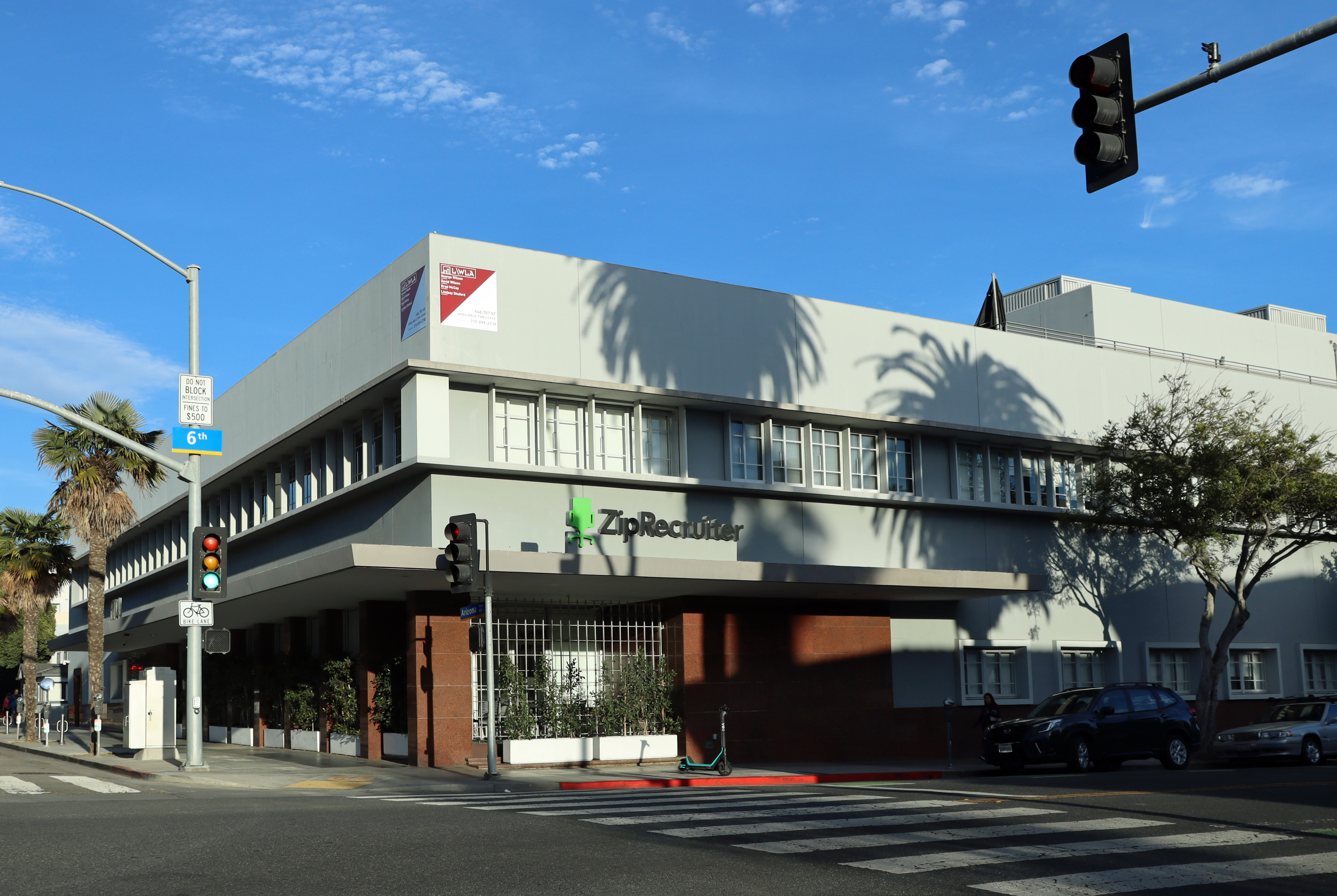
ZipRecruiter headquarters in Santa Monica

ZipRecruiter, Inc. is an American employment marketplace for job seekers and employers.

The company is headquartered in Santa Monica, California, with offices in Tempe, Arizona; London, UK, and Tel Aviv, Israel.

== History ==
ZipRecruiter was founded on March 14, 2010 by Ian Siegel, Joe Edmonds, Ward Poulos and Will Redd.

In June 2015, as the company began growing, they opened an R&D center in Israel and in 2018, claimed to have developed an artificial intelligence algorithm to increase the accuracy of job seeker/employer matches.

In 2017, Facebook also partnered with the company and integrated ZipRecruiter into its platform.

In 2018, the company reported that over 1.5 million businesses and 430 million job seekers used its platform.

In December 2018, the company's users' names and email addresses were exposed in a data breach. ZipRecruiter claimed that they were able to fix it within 90 minutes after the technical glitch was reported.

In March 2019, ZipRecruiter began operating in Canada.

In April 2021, the company filed for a direct listing. The company went public on May 26, 2021.

In September 2021, ZipRecruiter signed a one-year deal with UFC for a "low seven-figure fee".

In May 2023, ZipRecruiter announced it laying off 20% of its staff, about 270 roles.

== Funding ==
ZipRecruiter delayed raising venture capital until 2014, when the company's first round of financing of $63 million was led by IVP.

In October 2018, the company raised $156 million for its online employment marketplace, which brought its total funding to $219 million. Blake Irving, Cipora Herman, and Emilie Choi were added as new members to its board. The October 2018 raise was at a valuation of $1 billion.
