= Colin Campbell (entrepreneur) =

Canadian entrepreneur

Colin C. Campbell
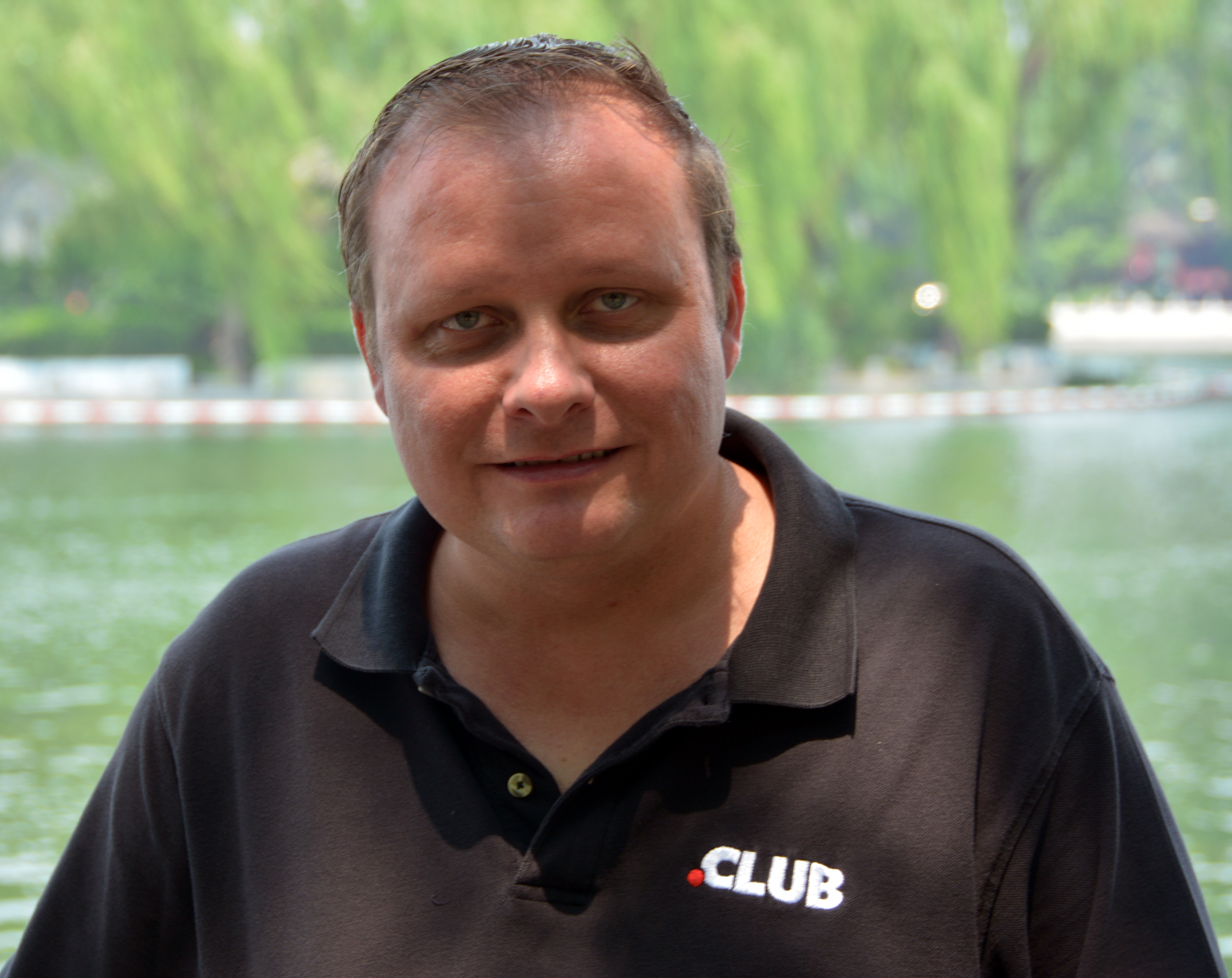
- Colin C. Campbell in May 2015
- Education: University of Toronto
- Occupations: Cofounder– Internet Direct, Hostopia, Tucows, .Club Domains, Paw.com, Startup.club
- Website: colinccampbell.com; startup.club

Colin C. Campbell is a Canadian entrepreneur and author who has co-founded several Internet and technology startup companies, including Internet Direct, Tucows, Hostopia, Paw.com, GeeksforLess.com, .Club Domains LLC, the operator of .club, and Startup Club.

== Career ==
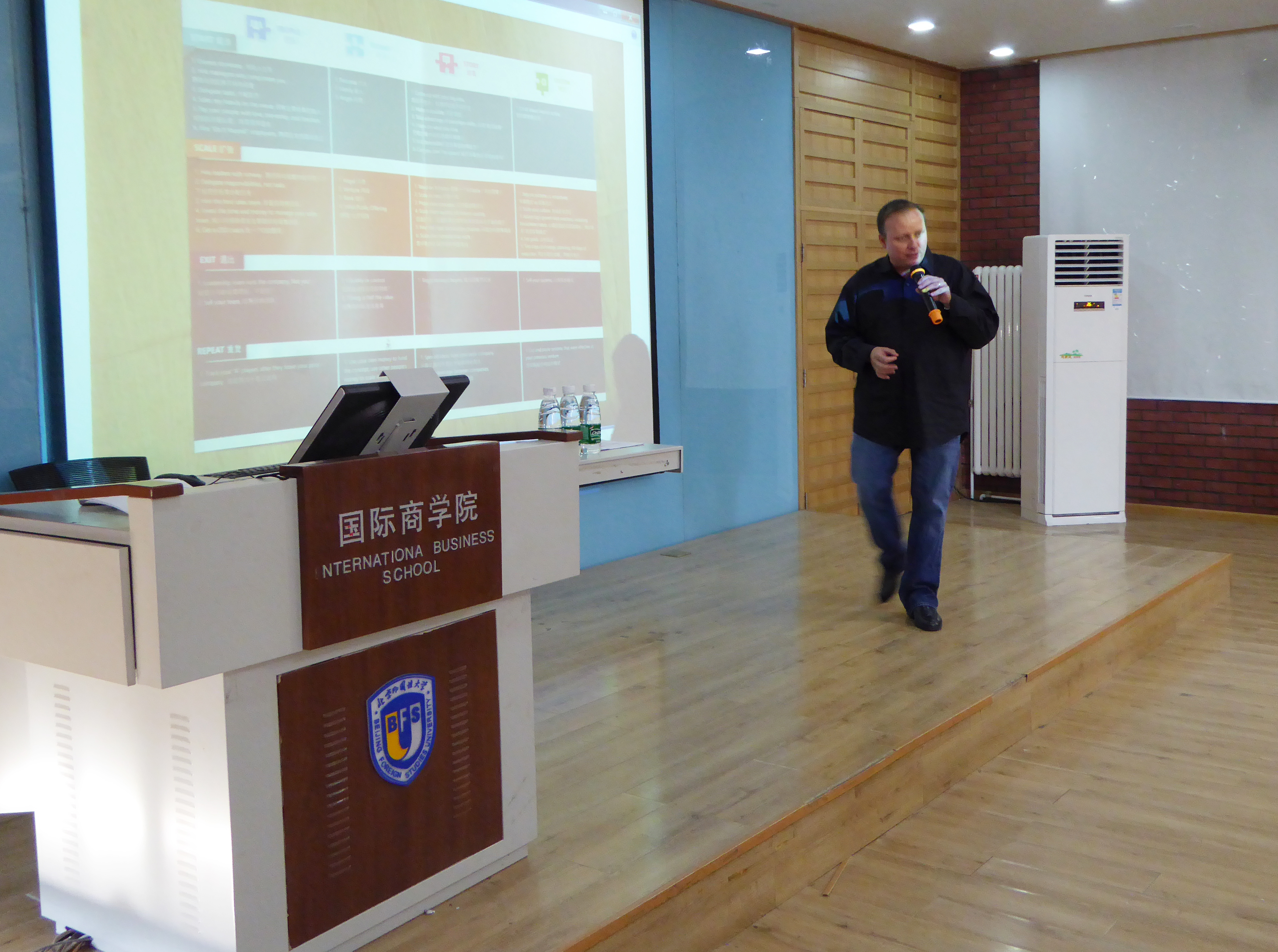
Campbell giving a lecture on entrepreneurship in Beijing in 2015

Campbell has co-founded several Internet and technology companies, including Internet Direct, the domain registrar Tucows, and Hostopia, a website hosting and service provider sold to Deluxe. Campbell is a founding member of .CA, the Canadian Internet Registration Authority (CIRA) and served on its board of directors from June 2001 to January 2003.

Campbell was the founder and CEO of the domain name registry .Club Domains LLC, which operates the new generic top-level domain (gTLD) string .club. and sold the company to GoDaddy Registry in 2021. He formed .Club Domains with idea that the .club domain extension could appeal to commercial and social uses. After being invited to Massachusetts Institute of Technology (MIT) as a guest speaker on the topic of entrepreneurship, Campbell received $100,000 in investments funding for .club from an investor who witnessed his speech. In May 2015, Campbell was invited to give the keynote speech on entrepreneurship in China at Solbridge International School of Business at the Beijing Foreign Studies University.

In 2023, Forbes Books published Cambell's book Start. Scale. Exit. Repeat.

The book earned a 2024 Silver International Book Publishers Award, 2024 Best New NonFiction at International Book Awards, and won in the Business: Entrepreneurship & Small Business category at the American Legacy Book Awards 2024.

== Personal life and recognition ==
Originally from Toronto, Campbell graduated from the University of Toronto with a Bachelor of Arts in commerce; he later moved to Fort Lauderdale, Florida, United States. His work has been recognized by Profit magazine, which named his companies the seventh-, third– and first-fastest growing in Canada in 1997, 1998, and 2005, respectively.
