= Jonathan D. Teubner =

- Born: Stillwater, Oklahoma, U.S.
- Occupations: Researcher, writer

Academic background
- Education: Oklahoma State University; Yale University; University of Cambridge

Academic work
- Discipline: Philosophy
- Sub-discipline: Theology, Cultural sociology

Jonathan D. Teubner is an American researcher and writer. He is a research associate at Harvard University's Human Flourishing Program. Teubner is known for his work in the history of philosophy, theology, and cultural sociology.

== Early life and education ==
Teubner grew up in Stillwater, Oklahoma. Teubner earned a BS in economics from Oklahoma State University in 2006. He later completed an MA in philosophy of religion at Yale University in 2010. Teubner studied Arabic and religious studies at the University of Tubingen from 2007 to 2008. He completed a PhD in intellectual history at the University of Cambridge in 2013.

== Career ==
After completing his doctorate, he held a Fernand Braudel postdoctoral fellowship at Paris-Sorbonne University from 2014 to 2015. He later worked at the University of Virginia from 2015 to 2019 as associate director of the university's research program on Religion, Politics and Conflict. From 2019 to 2022, Teubner was a Research Fellow at Humboldt University of Berlin.

In 2021, he joined Harvard University as a research associate and program lead with the Human Flourishing Program. In the same year he co-founded of FilterLabs.AI, a data analytics company that analyzes public sentiment using online and social media content.

Teubner's research has focused on history of philosophy, theology, and cultural sociology. His work also includes research on the relationship between artificial intelligence and human flourishing. He has published books on St. Augustine of Hippo and the development of the Latin theological tradition, including Prayer after Augustine: A Study in the Development of the Latin Tradition (2018), which won the Manfred Lautenschlaeger Award for Theological Promise in 2019, and Charity after Augustine: Solidarity, Conflict, and the Practices of Charity (2024).
