= XO Communications =

American telecommunications company

XO Communications, LLC
- Trade name: XO
- Type: Subsidiary
- Industry: Telecommunications
- Predecessors: Nextlink Communications; Concentric Network Corporation; Allegiance Telecom, Inc.
- Founded: July 4, 1996; 30 years ago in Bellevue, Washington
- Fate: Replaced by Verizon
- Successor: Verizon Communications
- Headquarters: Herndon, Virginia, U.S.
- Areas served: Primarily the United States, South America, Europe, Middle East, Asia and Oceania
- Key people: Chris Ancell, CEO; Amador Lucero, COO
- Products: VoIP services, Network Services, Hosted Services, Carrier / Wholesale
- Website: www.xo.com

XO Communications, LLC, previously Nextlink Communications, Concentric Network Corporation and Allegiance Telecom, Inc., was an American telecommunications company. It was purchased and replaced by Verizon Communications.

== Services ==
XO provided managed and converged Internet Protocol (IP) network services for small and medium-sized enterprises. XO delivered services through a mix of fiber-based Ethernet and Ethernet over Copper (EoC). In addition, the company had external network-to-network interface (E-NNI) agreements with traditional carriers and cable companies.

== Acquisition ==
In a news release dated February 22, 2016, Verizon announced plans to acquire XO Communications' "fiber-optic network business". In 2017, Verizon completed its $1.8 billion acquisition of XO Communications. As of summer 2020 all XO services have been migrated to Verizon.
