= AboutUs.com =

Wiki Internet domain directory

AboutUs
- Company type: Privately held company
- Website type: Wiki; Web directory
- Available in: Multilingual
- Founded: 2006; 20 years ago
- Headquarters: Denver, Colorado, U.S.
- Owners: Omkarasana, LLC
- Founders: Ray King; Jay Westerdal
- Website: aboutus.com
- Advertising: Google AdSense
- Registration: Optional
- Launched: May 9, 2006; 20 years ago
- Current status: Online, without activity

AboutUs.com is an inactive internet domain directory wiki. It lists websites along with information about their content. As a wiki, AboutUs allows Internet users to add entries or modify information. AboutUs.com has since become a wiki for more than just websites. The site allows pages to be created for people, places, and almost anything else.

Ray King, Jay Westerdal, and Paul Stahura founded AboutUs in 2005. Later in 2006 a small staff of five people in Portland, Oregon, United States developed out the site. The staff expanded to more than thirty people and two continents with an office in Lahore, Pakistan. From May 2007 to early 2011, Ward Cunningham, developer of the first wiki, was the chief technology officer of AboutUs.

AboutUs attracted at least 1.4 million U.S. visitors in July 2008. They used to use the domain name "AboutUs.org", but moved to new site under "AboutUs.com" in May 2010. Traffic and revenue started declining sharply and in 2013 AboutUs.com and its assets were sold to Omkarasana LLC, a Colorado Limited Liability Company located in Denver. The new company has since redesigned the website, migrated its infrastructure over to Amazon Web Services, and attempted to increase visitors and revenue.

== Website contents ==
There were more than ten million entries on AboutUs.com as of March 2008, with about 25,000 pages being added a day during that period. Most entries were created by a web robot (bot); web searches by users direct the bot to create a page for a web domain. In many cases the content is simply a republication of the contents of the "About us", "About me", or similar page on the website. Such pages typically describe the entity that owns the site, and may include self-promotional information, which AboutUs.com does not restrict. In many other cases the content of an entry consists of the whois data for the website. As of February 2014, there were more than 20 million entries.

=== Data use ===
Some websites that analyze domains and traffic link to AboutUs.com as a point of additional reference. Notably, the "Whois" site DomainTools referenced the Aboutus.com listing along with standard server information, domain ownership and history, and additional data. AboutUs also referenced whois data content from the registrars Network Solutions and Register.com.

=== Malware domains ===
To prevent users from visiting malware domains, editors worked with McAfee SiteAdvisor and PHSDL to identify such domains. Once a malware domain is identified, an AboutUs MalwareSite template was placed to warn users.

== Funding ==
In November 2006, AboutUs closed its initial financing round for one million dollars. In January 2009, AboutUs secured a $5 million funding round from Voyager Capital.

== See also ==
- DMOZ
- Alexa Internet
- List of companies based in Oregon
