= Jay Westerdal =

American domainer and entrepreneur

- Born: Jay Westerdal; 1978 (age 46–47); Seattle, Washington, U.S.
- Known for: Founder of DomainTools.com
- Spouse: Icy Westerdal (m. 2010)
- Website: www.jaywesterdal.com

Jay Westerdal (born 1978) is an American domainer and entrepreneur, best known for his work creating DomainTools.com, a web service that looks up historical ownership of a website. The whois service was integrated into Google's onebox in May 2008. He later sold the company in 2008 for a reported $16–$18 million. He is a technology blogger.

== Career ==
Westerdal started Name Intelligence/DomainTools in 2002 in his parents' garage. In May 2005, Jay started the domain conference "Domain RoundTable". He later sold DomainTools in 2008 to Thought Convergence, Inc. The following year, after being acquired, he left TCI.

== Writing ==
Westerdal's personal blog covers a wide range of topics, focusing mainly on technology, his mobile lifestyle, and search engine optimization from a personal perspective, in contrast to the DomainTools blog, where he wrote in an official capacity. He contributed to the EPP Protocol RFC 4930.
