= Lamparello v. Falwell =

2005 American legal case

- Court: United States Court of Appeals for the Fourth Circuit
- Full case name: Christopher Lamparello v. Jerry Falwell; Jerry Falwell Ministries
- Argued: 2005-05-26 2005
- Decided: 2005-08-24 2005
- Citations: 420 F.3d 309 (4th Cir. 2005), Nos. 04-2122, 04-2011

Case history
- Prior history: Claude M. Hilton ruled for plaintiff Falwell in 360 F.Supp.2d 768 (E.D. VA. 2004)

Holding
- The 4th Circuit holds that Lamparello's gripe site does not infringe on Falwell's trademarks.

Court membership
- Judges sitting: Diana Gribbon Motz, M. Blane Michael, Robert Bruce King

Case opinions
- Majority: Diana Gribbon Motz, joined by M. Blane Michael, Robert Bruce King

Lamparello v. Falwell, 420 F.3d 309 (4th Cir. 2005), was a legal case heard by the United States Court of Appeals for the Fourth Circuit concerning allegations of cybersquatting and trademark infringement. The dispute centered on the right to use the domain name fallwell.com, and provides discussion on cybersquatting as it applies to criticism of a trademark.

In 1999, Christopher Lamparello created a website to respond to and criticize the anti-homosexual statements by the American Christian evangelical preacher Jerry Falwell. Lamparello's website was located at fallwell.com (note the misspelling). Believing that there was confusing similarity between the domain name and Falwell's own name, domain name, and other trademarks, Falwell and his ministries attempted to legally block Lamparello from using the mark "fallwell" and transfer the ownership of the domain name to Falwell.

The initial decisions (ruled by the National Arbitration Forum in 2003 and the United States District Court for the Eastern District of Virginia in 2004) decided in favor of Falwell, granting Falwell's claims of federal trademark infringement, false designation of origin, unfair competition, and cybersquatting.

On appeal in 2005, the United States Court of Appeals for the Fourth Circuit reversed the earlier decisions, ruling that there was not a "likelihood of confusion" between Lamparello's and Falwell's official site; that there was no trademark infringement based on "initial interest confusion" for sites that were non-commercial and critical of the trademark holder; and since Lamparello's site was non-commercial, there was no "bad faith intent to profit" and it was not cybersquatting.

== Background ==
In 1999, Christopher Lamparello registered the domain name fallwell.com and used the affiliated website as a gripe site to express his negative opinions about the Fundamentalist Christian preacher Jerry Falwell's public statements against homosexuality.

Lamparello's site was plainly critical of Falwell and had very little viewership. The website offered no goods or services for sale, though the website contained a link to a separate Amazon.com webpage selling a book supporting his views, but Lamparello did not stand to financially gain from the sales of the book. Lamparello's website also contained prominent statements declaring that it was not affiliated with Falwell and his ministry, and provided a hyperlink to redirect viewers to Falwell's official website. Lamparello claimed that the domain name was chosen as a parody of Falwell's name, combining "fall" and "well".

Falwell had a registered trademark in the name "Listen America with Jerry Falwell". At the time, Falwell did not have any registered trademarks in the names "Falwell" or "Fallwell", but was in the process of registering the name "Jerry Falwell". Falwell had an official website at the domain name falwell.com, where he also sold goods.

Believing in a confusing similarity between the two domain names, Falwell sent Lamparello letters in 2001 and 2003 demanding that Lamparello cease and desist from using fallwell.com or any variation of Falwell's name as a domain name. Lamparello did not comply.

== Prior history ==
=== UDRP complaint ===
In October 2003, Falwell submitted a complaint to the National Arbitration Forum (NAF), in accordance with ICANN's Uniform Domain Name Dispute Resolution Policy (UDRP), requesting that the domain name be transferred from Lamparello to Falwell.

Under the UDRP, the complainant must show that the registered domain name is identical or confusingly similar to their trademark, that the registrant has no legitimate interest in the domain name, and that the domain name is being used in bad faith.

The NAF panel decided 2-1 on November 20, 2003 to transfer the domain name to Falwell's ministries, Liberty Alliance.

The dissenting panelist, David E. Sorkin, argued that the domain name was not used in bad faith, and that this dispute was not one to be resolved under the UDRP or by the NAF.

==== Related case: jerryfalwell.com ====
A contemporaneous case was one concerning Gary Cohn and the domain names jerryfalwell.com and jerryfallwell.com. Falwell sued Cohn for "reverse domain name hijacking", but the World Intellectual Property Organization (WIPO) in Geneva, Switzerland did not accept the case since Falwell did not have a trademark on his own name. After Falwell threatened to sue in Virginia, U.S. in 2003, Cohn surrendered both domain names.

=== District Court ===
Following the NAF decision, Lamparello filed an action against Falwell in federal district court, seeking declaratory judgment of non-infringement. Lamparello was represented by Paul Alan Levy of Public Citizen Litigation Group. The ACLU also provided an amicus brief, arguing that the domain name in question was protected by the First Amendment.

Falwell filed a counterclaim, alleging trademark infringement under 15 U.S.C. § 1114 (2000), false designation origin under 15 U.S.C. § 1125(a), unfair competition under 15 U.S.C. § 1126 and the common law of the state of Virginia, and cybersquatting under 15 U.S.C. § 1125(d).

The District Court granted summary judgment for Falwell, blocking Lamparello from using the domain name and ordered the transfer of the website to Falwell. The court denied Falwell's request for statutory damages and attorney fees.

== Opinion of the Court ==
Lamparello appealed the District Court's order and Falwell cross-appealed the denial of statutory damages and attorney fees.

The U.S. Court of Appeals for the Fourth Circuit unanimously reversed the District Court's decision, ruling that Lamparello could continue maintaining the gripe website at fallwell.com. The court reasoned as follows:

Likelihood of Confusion
The Court used the 4th Circuit's seven part test for likelihood of confusion: "(a) the strength or distinctiveness of the mark; (b) the similarity of the two marks; (c) the similarity of the goods/services the marks identify; (d) the similarity of the facilities the two parties use in their businesses; (e) the similarity of the advertising used by the two parties; (f) the defendant’s intent; (g) actual confusion."

In applying this test, the Appeals Court found that there was only a similarity in the online marks, but nothing else was applicable, and that "Lamparello clearly created his website intending only to provide a forum to criticize ideas, not to steal customers."

The Court of Appeals stressed that there was no confusion that Lamparello's site was not affiliated with Falwell or his ministries.

After even a quick glance at the content of the website at www.fallwell.com, no one seeking Reverend Falwell’s guidance would be misled by the domain name — www.fallwell.com — into believing Reverend Falwell authorized the content of that website. No one would believe that Reverend Falwell sponsored a site criticizing himself, his positions, and his interpretations of the Bible.

Initial Interest Confusion
This argument is roughly a typosquatting argument, wherein legitimate potential customers seeking Falwell's website might misspell his official domain name and instead go to fallwell.com, giving Lamparello an "unearned audience". The Appeals Court states that there must be a financial profit from the initial interest confusion, and in the case of noncommercial gripe sites, there is no way to financially profit from the confusion. "This critical element — use of another firm’s mark to capture the markholder’s customers and profits — simply does not exist when the alleged infringer establishes a gripe site that criticizes the markholder."

Cybersquatting
In order to win a cybersquatting claim, Falwell would have to show bad faith intent to profit from using the fallwell.com domain name, and prove that the domain name is "identical or confusingly similar to, or dilutive of, the distinctive and famous mark". In addition to the already established lack of confusion, the Appeals Court found that Lamparello did not have a bad faith intent to profit due to the lack of income from the site, that Lamparello had not attempted to sell the domain name, and that Lamparello had not purchased a large quantity of domain names. (Note: Referencing the ACPA, the Appeals Court also stressed that the ACPA does not limit domain names used for the purposes of noncommercial commentary. From the 4th Circuit Opinion: "Factor IV of the ACPA, 15 U.S.C. § 1125(d)(1) (B)(i)(IV), counsels against finding a bad faith intent to profit in such circumstances because "use of a domain name for purposes of . . . comment, [and] criticism," H.R. Rep. No. 106-412, 1999 WL 970519, at *11, constitutes a "bona fide noncommercial or fair use" under the statute, 15 U.S.C. § 1125(d)(1)(B)(i)(IV).")

Finally, agreeing with prior cases in the Fifth and Sixth Circuits, "the use of a mark in a domain name for a gripe site criticizing the markholder does not constitute cybersquatting."

== Subsequent developments ==
On April 17, 2006, the U.S. Supreme Court declined to hear an appeal from Falwell regarding the 4th Circuit opinion, giving no reasons for declining.

As of August 2018, the website is no longer functioning. The last archival snapshot of the site was taken in February 2012, implying that it went down later that year.

== Significance ==
In contrast to the Court of Appeals' 2001 opinion in People for the Ethical Treatment of Animals v. Doughney, where the Court affirmed the District Court's judgment against the defendant, this case supported the defendant, ruling against one gripe site and for the other. In PETA, the parody website's content was not conveyed simultaneously with the message that the site was peta.org. In short, the Fourth Circuit backtracked on its decision in PETA, justifying the different opinions as a distinction between parody and consumer confusion. Additionally, in both PETA and Lamparello, the website in question had links to items for sale. The distinction between the two cases may have been that in PETA, the defendant registered numerous other websites for cybersquatting purposes. The utilization of the bad-faith factors of the ACPA has been criticized by some scholars for leading to counterintuitive results when applied to cases that are not clear-cut cybersquatting.

Perhaps the Court of Appeals has created a lesson here for counsel representing parties who might assert cyber squatting claims. Before filing suit, initiate bad faith settlement negotiations, for the purpose of obtaining a statement from the cyber squatter that he might be willing to settle. Then, file suit under the ACPA, asserting that your opponent's willingness to engage in your bad faith settlement negotiations demonstrates a bad faith intent to profit on his part.

This opinion is important when considering typosquatting and gripe sites as it upheld Fifth and Sixth Circuit decisions that "the use of a mark in a domain name for a gripe site criticizing the markholder does not constitute cybersquatting." This opinion contained direct analysis of application of the Initial Interest Confusion doctrine, but leaves questions regarding the IIC unanswered.

== See also ==
- Anticybersquatting Consumer Protection Act

== Related cases ==
- People for the Ethical Treatment of Animals v. Doughney, 263 F.3d 359 (4th Cir. 2001).
- Hustler Magazine v. Falwell, 485 U.S. 46 (1988).
- Bosley Med. Ins., Inc. v. Kremer, 403 F.3d 672, 674 (9th Cir. 2005).
- TMI, Inc. v. Maxwell, 368 F.3d 433, 434-35 (5th Cir. 2004).
- Lucas Nursery & Landscaping v. Grosse, 359 F.3d 810 (6th Cir. 2004).
- Planned Parenthood Federation of America, Inc. v. Bucci, 42 U.S.P.Q.2d 1430 (S.D.N.Y. 1997).
