= Joe Cartoon =

Animated web cartoon series

- Genre: Animation
- Created by: Joseph C. Shields
- Written by: Joseph C. Shields
- Voices of: Joseph C. Shields
- Original language: English

Production
- Animator: Joseph C. Shields

Original release
- Release: 1 December 1998 – present

Joe Cartoon is an Flash animated series created by Joseph C. Shields and later animated by Mondo Media. Starting as an independent website, Joe Cartoon was later affiliated with Atom Films, before becoming independent again in 2006, then being bought in 2007 by Endemol.

Noted for their crude humor and tongue-in-cheek violence, Joe Cartoons were among the first widely distributed web-based productions of their kind. Produced in Macromedia's (Adobe's) Flash format, a number of the cartoons are interactive, such as "Gerbil in a Microwave" and "Frog in a Blender". "Frog in a Blender" has been downloaded at least 110 million times. Before the dotcom crash, the site was said to be making $25,000 per month from banner advertising. Shields won $80,000 in compensation from John Zuccarini in 2001 under the Anticybersquatting Consumer Protection Act after Zuccarini cybersquatted domain names.

The cartoons were broadcast on G4 as part of their Happy Tree Friends & Friends evening, and Joe Cartoon was in the top 10 on iTunes for several months. In April 2006, a collection of 40 Joe Cartoon creations was released on DVD in North America, with some DVD-specific content created for the release. Joecartoon was taken down in 2010 and the content was moved over to YouTube; however, the website returned in May 2012.

== Characters ==
The Gerbil

The Gerbil is one of the most well-known characters from the website, next to Superfly. His first appearance was in the 1999 cartoon Gerbil in a Microwave, when the user presses various speeds on a microwave in order for the gerbil to explode from too much heat. He has appeared in most of the cartoons, where he always gets into dangerous situations which results in death. Examples include getting stabbed by a pencil shot from the man in Numbah 2 Pencil III, being devoured by piranhas in Joefish, getting shot by a gun in Gerbill, and even getting run over by a Hummer along with his army of other gerbils while storming to find Joecartoon, who they claim is responsible for the gratuitous violence against gerbils in Gerbil Genocide.

However, in Donkey Bong (Long version), the gerbil laments about people "Kicking his ass, for what? A couple of laughs?" and that he is sick of being in dangerous situations that resulted in death from past films.

Lump the No-Legged Dog

Lump is a big dog without any legs, who made his debut in the 1999 self-titled cartoon which shows him doing a variety of tricks, even though he does not have legs. In 2002, he has made a cameo appearance in Goanna Humpa during the 'technical difficulties'. Lump has been shown in the Greenfields series, when Jebidiah tries to find a solution to end destruction of a city by spray-painting him and calling him 'Super Cow', but he does not have any special powers due to his lack of legs. Lump has recently appeared in Numbah 2 Pencil part 3 trying to pull a parachute string, but he cannot due to his lack of arms. However, he pulls the string after all which makes his bag pop out confetti.

Thuh Greenfields

The Greenfields are a family of pot farming/performance artists who face weird events. Jebidiah is the husband and Gertrude is the wife. They debuted in 2004 with the 15-part series 'Thuh Greenfields'. In it, Jebidiah produces a dominatrix porn video for sale on the Internet which involves him and his wife 'spanking', facing the city destroyed by a giant kid named Gummo, who shortly dies after playing with a spaceship, which explodes.

The Greenfields made a cameo appearance in Joemomma's 10-Pump BB gun. Jebidiah however made an appearance in Joemomma's Psychotherapy, while talking to Joemomma about his problems with Gertrude drinking cider, which almost killed him due to the fact that she farted during sex while he was "lookin' around with his lighter". They have also appeared in the music video for 'I'm a Little Catfish', and even in a small short holiday film in which Gertrude gave a stripper pole to Jebidiah as a Christmas gift and coerces him to "start dancin'" by wielding a rifle she bought for herself.

They recently appeared in a cartoon called 'Possum Whistle', a fake infomercial that describes a device used to lure possums into being crushed by Jebidiah's 4X4 vehicle.

Superfly

Superfly, or Supahfly, is another well-known character from the site. He is a fly who gets himself in certain situations, mostly involving alcohol or drug use. He made his debut in 2000 in '3 Drunk Flies' when he played pranks on a frog while hanging out on top of a man's beer can with two other flies. It quickly became successful and another short was created the same year with Supahfly II, which the fly faced a man typing on his computer and the man inadvertently 'sucked' the fly after being insulted, who spits the fly on the computer screen, then the fly immediately attacks the man through martial arts. Later in 2000, the fly starred in the other cartoon 'Stoneflies', which the fly and his 2 buddies face a man smoking weed and the man kills the other 2 flies. A sequel came out in 2001 with Stoneflies II, which shows a frog flying out of an airplane and being wiped by a sloth mistaking it for toilet paper. It then lands on the man, who dies after licking it on the fly's orders.

Supahfly made another appearance in the 2002 holiday short 'Supahfly Doll Commercial' in which he sees Santa and gets shooed away, but plotted revenge by firing a huge candy-cane pole, which impales Santa. After a 4-year hiatus, Supahfly returned in Supahfly 6, and then later on in 2008 in Bongzai and Thongzai, pts. 1 & 2, along with a small appearance in Numbah 2 Pencil III. He also did a cover of the Greenfields' song 'I'm a Little Catfish.' Superfly was seen recently in the cartoon 'Possum Whistle', when he watches the Greenfields' infomercial along with a man on the couch and a possum witnesses the infomercial and jumps against the screen, but gets blown up back to the wall and dies. He has many catchphrases, such as 'Oh, my freakin' head, I'm so wasted!' to 'Hey man, you pissed off SUPAHFLY!!'

Joemomma

Joemomma is a hyperactive bratty little kid who irritates and annoys everybody he sees, especially penguins. He made his first appearance in the 2003 cartoon 'Joemomma' in which he gets kicked out by his cigarette smoking mother, who Joemomma annoys about not taking care of him and himself being sent away to Social Services while everyone is going to hate the mother for the rest of her life until she dies. Then he sees a penguin and insults it due to its weight and its inability to do anything except walking, but the penguin immediately attacks, which knocks the kid out cold. At the end [after a short cameo by the Gerbil (in the second appearance, he yells that there is no part of his contract about "getting slammed up against the aquarium every two seconds" and goes on a strike)], he is found in a cabinet, making viewers realize that it was all a dream, but then Joemomma gives the finger.

In 2006, Joemomma appeared in Joemomma's 10-Pump BB Gun, which he is putting the gun at many different speeds to shoot the Gerbil. The first projectile misses the gerbil, both his eyes get poked out by the next 2 BBs and the remaining 6 gets shot at various humans and creatures, until he gets 'snake eyes', which make him see again. About to shoot the last projectile, then gets shot by a hunter, who then shoots the Gerbil after being hit by a paint thinner bottle thrown by the Gerbil. Joemomma then congratulates the hunter, a political spoof of Vice President Dick Cheney's hunting accident, and thinking it could be his 'dad', but the hunter is not.

Joemomma made another appearance in 2006's Joemomma Psychotherapy and he is shown recently at the end of the Supahfly short, Thongzai 2: The Legend of El Condom, in which he sings and runs around the house while the mother watches.

== Cartoons ==
The cartoons available from the website are broken into several categories, structured to highlight and provide easy access to the most popular series or collections.

Press n' Splode

The header of this category on the website is actually Press n 'Splode as most of these seventeen cartoons involve one or more characters exploding at some point. Each of these cartoons require varying degrees of interaction from the user. Some as simple as clicking a button to move on to the next section, with others having various branching paths depending on the users selections. This is where to find two of Joe's most famous works, Gerbil in a Microwave and Frog in a Blender.

Superfly

This collection focuses on the ubiquitous character Superfly (aka Supahfly), arguably the most well known character from any of the Joe Cartoons. Each of these places Superfly in a different situation, most involving drinking or drug use. Superfly's catch phrase of "Oh, my freakin' head, I'm so wasted!" often comes into play.

Thuh Greenfields

Thuh Greenfields is a series of cartoons centered on Jebidiah and Gertrude Greenfield. The characters are portrayed as small-scale cannabis farmers and performance artists who become involved in a series of unusual and often surreal events, including interactions with a legless dog named Lump and a large character referred to as Gummo.

In A Blender

This category focuses on interactive cartoons where the user presses the buttons on the blender.

Everything Else

This final category groups together other Joe Cartoon offerings, illustrating a wide range of topics and art styles that have been explored since the website was first created.

== Transition to YouTube ==
In 2010, the Joe Cartoon website was shut down and moved to YouTube according to a statement on YouTube by Joe Cartoon:

"We have now found a new home and it is YouTube. In order to keep the content serving up free, beer flowing and fishing rod wet we have decided to move the site completely over to YouTube—so consider this the official home of JoeCartoon. We hope that all our active fans will find sanctuary in our new spot and keep it active and alive."

On 17 May 2012 Joe announced that his website had returned, the announcement was made on YouTube as well with a video titled: Joe Cartoon - Peace Love.
