= Nissan Motors v. Nissan Computer =

2004 American trademark case

- Court: United States Court of Appeals for the Ninth Circuit
- Full case name: Nissan Motor Co., a Japanese corporation; Nissan North America, Inc., a California corporation, Plaintiffs-Appellants, v. Nissan Computer Corporation, a North Carolina corporation; The Internet Center Inc., a North Carolina corporation, Defendants-Appellees.
- Decided: 6 August 2004

Court membership
- Judges sitting: Stephen S. Trott; Pamela Ann Rymer; Sidney Runyan Thomas

Nissan Motors v. Nissan Computer was a lengthy court case between the two parties over the use of the name Nissan and the domain name nissan.com. The case has received national attention in the U.S.

== Background ==
=== Nissan Motor Company ===
The Japanese automotive manufacturer and business group Nissan has used the name since 1928. In the late 1970s, American Datsun began progressively fitting its cars with small "Nissan" and "Datsun by Nissan" badges. The company eventually changed its branding at 1,100 Datsun dealerships. In autumn 1981, Datsun announced that its name would be changed in the United States. Between 1982 and 1986, the company transitioned from its "Datsun, We Are Driven!" to its "The Name is Nissan" campaign. Five years after the name change program was over, cars in some export markets continued to display badges bearing both names, and Datsun remained more familiar than Nissan.

=== Uzi Nissan ===
Uzi Nissan was born on August 18, 1951. In 1980, Uzi Nissan founded Nissan Foreign Car, an automobile service, in Raleigh, North Carolina. In 1987, Uzi Nissan founded Nissan International, Ltd, an import/export company that traded primarily in heavy equipment and computers. On 14 May 1991, Uzi Nissan founded Nissan Computer Corporation, which provides sales and service of personal computers, servers, and computer parts, as well as internet hosting and development. Nissan Computer registered nissan.com for its use on 4 June 1994, five years before Nissan Motor Corporation's interest in the domain.

On July 17, 2020, Uzi Nissan died of complications from COVID-19. Following his death, unknown person(s) stole Uzi Nissan's domains. They have since been returned.

== Case ==
Nissan Computer registered the domain nissan.com in 1994, at first advertising its computer-related services. In 1999, Nissan Computer began selling advertising on nissan.com, including car-related advertising. Nissan Motors first offered to buy the domain from Nissan Computer, then filed suit, alleging trademark dilution, trademark infringement, and cyber squatting.

The 9th Circuit refused to order the transfer of the domain name.

Following the case outcome, Nissan Motors uses nissanusa.com for its U.S. website.

== See also ==
- Microsoft v. MikeRoweSoft
- Microsoft Corp. v. Shah
- Apple Corps v Apple Computer
