= Taubman Sucks =

- Directed by: Theo Lipfert
- Written by: Theo Lipfert
- Music by: Stefan Hakenberg
- Release date: June 19, 2004

Taubman Sucks is a short documentary about a precedent-setting intellectual property lawsuit.

The documentary was written and directed by filmmaker Theo Lipfert, an associate professor in the School of Film and Photography at Montana State University in Bozeman, Montana. An original score was created for the documentary by composer Stefan Hakenberg of Juneau, Alaska.

The six-minute film explores Taubman v. WebFeats, a lawsuit that involved the complex relationships between domain names, trademarks, and free speech. As the first "sucks.com" case to reach the level of the United States Court of Appeals, the decision in Taubman v. WebFeats established precedents concerning the non-commercial use of trademarks in domain names.

== Screening history ==
Taubman Sucks premiered at the Seattle Art Museum on June 19, 2004. It subsequently has been screened at more than 30 film festivals and has appeared on television several times. It was one of ten short films selected for the "Best of the Northwest Film & Video Festival Tour" sponsored by the Northwest FilmCenter in 2005.
