= Microsoft Corp. v. Shah =

Court case in the United States

Microsoft Corp. v. Shah et al.
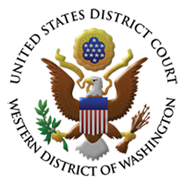
- Court: United States District Court for the Western District of Washington
- Full case name: Microsoft Corporation v. Amish P. Shah, Jose A. Rivera, Digispace Solutions LLC, YMultimedia LLC, and DOES 1-50
- Decided: July 11, 2011
- Citation: Case No. C10-0653 RSM
- Transcript: On Recap

Holding
- Motion to dismiss denied; case settled out of court

Court membership
- Judge sitting: Ricardo S. Martinez

Microsoft Corp. v. Shah was an Anticybersquatting Consumer Protection Act (ACPA) case heard before the United States District Court for the Western District of Washington. Microsoft sued the defendants, Amish Shah and others, for, among other charges, contributory cybersquatting for encouraging others, through videos and software, to infringe on Microsoft's trademarks. The case was settled out of court in July 2011 after judge Ricardo S. Martinez denied Shah's motion for dismissal. Legal observers suggested that, if upheld, the case would prove notable for the court's expansion of the ACPA liability to include contributory cybersquatting.

== Background ==
Amish Shah, with help from the other defendants, registered domain names containing Microsoft trademarks, and induced others to register similar domains. Some of these domains used possible misspellings of trademarked Microsoft names. Consumers seeking Microsoft products could mistakenly end up at the defendants' website and be tricked into downloading the defendants' products. In addition to cybersquatting, the defendants also produced instructions (including a video) on how to use Microsoft's marks in a misleading manner to maximize traffic to the website. Shah also offered a software system that enabled buyers to easily create websites incorporating Microsoft's marks.

On the basis of the latter, Microsoft made claims for contributory cybersquatting and contributory trademark dilution, in addition to cybersquatting, trademark dilution, and trademark infringement. Defendants moved to dismiss the claims for contributory cybersquatting and contributory dilution, arguing that such causes of action are not recognized under law. The ACPA created liability only for registering, trafficking, or using a domain name that is identical or confusingly similar to a protected mark. Additionally, the ACPA required proof that the defendant acted with "bad faith with intent to profit from the mark."

== Opinion of the Court ==
Judge Ricardo Martinez decided against dismissal on January 12, 2011, affirming that Microsoft had a possible case against Shah. The court first noted that while contributory trademark infringement is well established, the ACPA, unlike trademark law, required a showing of "bad faith intent." Previous courts, notably in Ford Motor Co. v. Greatdomains.com, reasoned that a higher standard was required for claims of contributory cybersquatting.

The court noted that the decision of the Ford court indicated that the court had recognized a cause of action under contributory cybersquatting, but found in favor of GreatDomains.com since Ford failed to show the requisite bad faith by GreatDomains.com. The Judge noted that in this particular case, the facts clearly demonstrated bad faith with an intent to profit, and as such denied the defendants' motion to dismiss. While the ACPA does not explicitly address causes of action under contributory liability, the court noted that action under the ACPA is a tort-like cause of action, and traditional principles of tort law impose liability on those who assist or contribute in the infringement.

== Impact ==
The court's decision notably expanded liability under the ACPA to include contributory damages, basing its decision on traditional principles of liability of tort law. Several scholars noted that the court's decision provides a precedent for expanding ACPA liability, beyond actions explicitly prohibited by the text of the law. This was particularly notable since Microsoft did not have to prove that the defendant actually sold any domain names to third parties or helped third parties acquire domain names.

An attempt was made in 2009 to sue GoDaddy, a domain registrar, under a different charge of "contributory cybersquatting". In this case, the Northern District Court of California ruled in favor of GoDaddy in January 2012.

== See also ==
- Anticybersquatting Consumer Protection Act
- Cybersquatting
- Domain Name System
- Microsoft v. MikeRoweSoft
