= People for the Ethical Treatment of Animals v. Doughney =

2001 lawsuit over cybersquatting

- Court: United States Court of Appeals for the Fourth Circuit
- Full case name: People for the Ethical Treatment of Animals v. Doughney
- Argued: May 7, 2001
- Decided: August 23, 2001
- Citation: 113 F. Supp. 2d 915, 2000 U.S. Dist. LEXIS 13421, 263 F.3d 359

Holding
- Using a trademarked name in the URL for an unaffiliated website, even for parody purposes, is a violation of the Anticybersquatting Consumer Protection Act.

Court membership
- Judges sitting: Roger Gregory, M. Blane Michael, Benson Everett Legg

Case opinions
- Majority: Roger Gregory, joined by M. Blane Michael, Benson Everett Legg

Laws applied
- 15 U.S.C.§1114, 15 U.S.C. §1125(a), 15 U.S.C. §1125(d)

People for the Ethical Treatment of Animals v. Doughney, 263 F.3d 359 (4th Cir. 2001), was an Internet domain trademark infringement decision by the United States Court of Appeals for the Fourth Circuit. The ruling became an early precedent on the nature of domain names as both trademarked intellectual property and free speech.

== Background ==
In 1995, Michael Doughney registered the domain name peta.org for his website titled "People Eating Tasty Animals". The website contained links to over 30 sites including some that promoted the sale of leather goods and meats. At the bottom of the page, the website inquired "Feeling lost? Offended? Perhaps you should, like, exit immediately" and provided a link to the official People for the Ethical Treatment of Animals (PETA) website, which due to Doughney's action had to use a less intuitive domain name.

In 1996, PETA requested that Doughney voluntarily transfer the domain name, because it owned the trademark for "PETA" though it had not yet used the acronym as a domain name. Doughney refused to do so, leading to the lawsuit, in which PETA alleged that Doughney had committed trademark infringement, trademark dilution, unfair competition, and cybersquatting. The case was first heard at the District Court for the Eastern District of Virginia.

Initially, PETA did not seek compensation other than enjoining Doughney from using the peta.org domain and seeking an order for him to transfer peta.org to PETA. Meanwhile, Doughney claimed that his website was a parody, which was an act of free speech and which should absolve him of the trademark infringement allegation.

The District Court for the Eastern District of Virginia ruled in favor of PETA and ordered Doughney to stop using the peta.org domain and to hand it over to the organization. Doughney appealed this decision to the Fourth Circuit. The district court did not honor PETA's request for Doughney to pay its legal fees, so the organization cross-appealed that decision.

== Circuit court opinion ==
=== Accusation of trademark infringement ===
The acronym "PETA" was a registered trademark that belonged to People for the Ethical Treatment of Animals. Thus the trademark infringement claim centered on whether the "defendant used the mark 'in connection with the sale, offering for sale, distribution, or advertising' of goods or services." The circuit court concluded that because the website may have confused users who wanted to buy items from or make donations to the true PETA organization, it was "connected" to commerce even though Doughney did not sell any goods or services.

Doughney claimed that his peta.org website was a parody of the PETA organization, and was free speech permissible under the First Amendment. The court relied on Cliffs Notes, Inc. v. Bantam Doubleday Dell Publishing Group, Inc. to rule that, in order to constitute a parody, Doughney's peta.org site should simultaneously convey that (1) the site was not the official PETA site, and (2) that it was merely a parody.

The court held that the domain name "peta.org" implied ownership by the organization, and thus did not qualify as a parody. The court found it unnecessary to review the content of Doughney's site and only considered his use of the domain name. Thus, while the court alluded to Doughney's First Amendment right to create a parody, it ruled that doing so in the form of a website with a domain name that infringed on the target's trademark was not allowable due to the possible confusion for viewers of the site over its ownership.

=== Accusation of cybersquatting ===
PETA also alleged that Doughney's use of its trademarked acronym in the domain name for his website, before they had the chance to do the same, was an act of cybersquatting that violated the Anticybersquatting Consumer Protection Act (ACPA). Before and during the litigation, Doughney made statements suggesting that PETA should "settle" with him and "make him an offer" for the domain name. This was seen by the court as his attempt to profit from the peta.org domain name. Because of this and the fact that the domain name is identical to the distinctive PETA trademark, the court ruled that Doughney had violated the ACPA. However, the court also held that PETA was not entitled to monetary damages because Doughney registered and used the domain name prior to the enactment of the statute. Instead, Doughney was merely required to surrender the domain name. This was soon completed and peta.org now leads to the official website for People for the Ethical Treatment of Animals.

=== Request for compensation ===
The court ruled that PETA was ineligible for an award of attorney's fees because Doughney did not maliciously infringe on the trademark, believing at the time that he could create a parody website that would be protected by the First Amendment.

== Subsequent events ==
In the Doughney ruling, the Fourth Circuit found it unnecessary to consider a website's content when determining whether it qualifies as a parody. The Fourth Circuit later modified this stance in Lamparello v. Falwell (2005). While discussing the Doughney precedent, the court wrote, "To determine whether a likelihood of confusion exists, a court should not [only] consider how closely a fragment of a given use duplicates the trademark, but must instead consider whether the use in its entirety creates a likelihood of confusion."

== See also ==
- Planned Parenthood Federation of America, Inc. v. Bucci
