= Planned Parenthood Federation of America, Inc. v. Bucci =

1997 American legal case

- Court: United States District Court for the Southern District of New York
- Decided: Mar. 19, 1997
- Citation: 1997 WL 133313

Case history
- Subsequent actions: Planned Parenthood Federation of America, Inc. v. Bucci, 152 F. 3d 920 (2nd Cir. 1998) (affirming district court by summary order).

Holding
- Using the name of an organization in the domain name of a website that criticizes that organization is a violation of trademark law.

Court membership
- Judge sitting: Kimba M. Wood

Keywords
- Cybersquatting, Lanham Act, United States trademark law

Planned Parenthood Federation of America, Inc. v. Bucci, 1997 WL 133313 (S.D.N.Y. 1997), was a court ruling at the United States District Court for the Southern District of New York. The ruling was an important early precedent on the trademark value of a domain name on the World Wide Web, and established the theory that hosting a site under a domain name that reflected the registered trademark of a different party constituted trademark infringement.

== Background ==
The American Birth Control League was founded in 1921, and changed its name to Planned Parenthood in 1942. That name was trademarked in 1955. Richard Bucci was an anti-abortion activist who operated a daily Catholic radio program in Syracuse, New York. In 1996, Bucci registered the domain name www.plannedparenthood.com before the organization had the chance to do so.

Bucci used the domain name for his own website, the homepage of which stated "Welcome to the PLANNED PARENTHOOD HOME PAGE!" The page included some anti-abortion and anti-birth control content, a scanned cover of the book The Cost of Abortion by Lawrence Roberge, and various links that led to more information about the book. The district court later described Roberge's book as anti-abortion as well.

Planned Parenthood filed suit in the District Court for the Southern District of New York, seeking an injunction to prevent Bucci from using the domain name, and claiming trademark infringement and trademark dilution per the Lanham Act.

== Opinion of the court ==
Bucci argued that his website was intended as a parody of the true Planned Parenthood organization and its beliefs, so his use of the domain name constituted free speech that was protected under the First Amendment. The court found that due to the confusion likely to be caused by his use of "plannedparenthood" in the domain name, his free speech defense was untenable. The court held that because Planned Parenthood wanted only to restrain Bucci's usage of their trademark as a domain name, and not his actual speech, he was still free to criticize the organization in any website with a less misleading domain name.

=== Trademark infringement ===
Per the Lanham Act, American trademark law makes it a violation for a party to "use in commerce any reproduction, counterfeit, copy, or colorable imitation of a registered mark in connection with the sale, offering for sale, distribution, or advertising of any goods or services on or in connection with which such use is likely to cause confusion, or to cause mistake, or to deceive."

The court interpreted that provision broadly. Accordingly, even though Bucci was not selling anything on his website, the court held that he was in violation of the Lanham Act because he was helping Roberge "plug" his book. Second, by promoting anti-birth control information, Bucci was providing a "service" to viewers of his site. Third, because Bucci was using "plannedparenthood" in the site's domain name, people looking for that organization's services could become confused upon reaching Bucci's site; this in turn interfered with Planned Parenthood's established services.

=== Trademark dilution ===
Federal trademark law also allows the owner of a registered trademark to enjoin a party's "use in commerce of a mark or trade name, if such use begins after the mark has become famous and causes dilution of the distinctive quality of the mark." Thus, the court ruled that Bucci's domain name diluted the trademark value enjoyed by the legitimate organization, with evidence that Bucci's actions were designed to do commercial harm to Planned Parenthood.

Furthermore, with his use of the obvious name "plannedparenthood" in his site's domain name, users could mistakenly conclude that the organization was the site's owner. Under Federal trademark law, a party infringes a trademark if the use "is likely to cause confusion, or to cause mistake, or to deceive as to the affiliation, connection, or association of such person with another person, or as to the origin, sponsorship, or approval of his or her goods, services, or commercial activities by another person." A business name that was likely to cause confusion among consumers with a different business was ruled to be a violation of trademark law in Polaroid Corp. v. Polarad Electronics Corp. at the Second Circuit Court of Appeals in 1961.

=== Ruling ===
Due to evidence that Bucci's domain name constituted both infringement and dilution of Planned Parenthood's trademark, the district court honored the organization's request for an injunction that prevented Bucci from using the domain name.

Bucci appealed to the United States Court of Appeals for the Second Circuit. In a brief summary order, the circuit court affirmed the district court's reasoning and upheld the injunction. Bucci then appealed that ruling to the Supreme Court of the United States, but certiorari was denied. Following this loss, Bucci transferred the "plannedparenthood.com" domain name to Planned Parenthood in 1999.

== See also ==
- People for the Ethical Treatment of Animals v. Doughney
