= MikeRoweSoft.com =

Legal dispute

MikeRoweSoft.com was a domain name registered by 17-year-old Canadian Belmont High School student Mike Rowe. The domain was the subject of a 2004 legal dispute between Rowe and Microsoft, who argued that their trademark had been infringed because of the phonetic resemblance between "Microsoft" and "MikeRoweSoft".

The case received international press attention following Microsoft's perceived heavy-handed approach to a 12th grade student's part-time web design business and the subsequent support that Rowe received from the online community. A settlement was eventually reached, with Rowe granting ownership of the domain to Microsoft in exchange for an Xbox; an all-expenses-paid trip to Redmond, Washington with his family; and additional Microsoft products and services.

== Background ==
Since my name is Mike Rowe, I thought it would be funny to add "soft" to the end of it.

— Mike Rowe

The domain name MikeRoweSoft.com was initially registered by Canadian student Mike Rowe on August 5, 2003. Rowe set up the site as a part-time web design business, choosing the domain because of the phonetic pun by adding the word "soft" to the end of his name. Microsoft saw the name as trademark infringement because of its phonetic resemblance to their trademarked corporate name and demanded that he give up the domain. After receiving a letter from Microsoft's Canadian legal representatives Smart & Biggar on January 14, 2004, Rowe replied asking to be compensated for giving up the domain.

Microsoft offered to pay Rowe's out-of-pocket expenses of $10, the original cost of registering the domain name. Rowe countered asking instead for $10,000, later claiming that he did this because he was "mad at" Microsoft for their initial $10 offer. Microsoft declined the offer and sent a cease and desist letter spanning 25 pages. Microsoft accused Rowe of setting up the site in order to try to force them into a large financial settlement, a practice known as cybersquatting.

== Press coverage and settlement ==
Rowe went to the press, creating publicity for the case and garnering support for his cause, including donations of over $6,000 and an offer of free advice from a lawyer. At one point Rowe was forced to take down his site after it was overwhelmed by around 250,000 page views over a period of twelve hours, only managing to get the site back up after changing to a service provider with a higher capacity. The case, portrayed as a David versus Goliath struggle by the media, characterized Microsoft in a negative light. The resulting bad publicity was later described as a "public-relations mess". The public showing of support that Rowe received was credited with "softening Microsoft's stance", leading to an eventual settlement.

In late January 2004, it was revealed that the two parties had come to an out-of-court settlement, with Microsoft taking control of the domain. In return Microsoft agreed to pay all of the expenses that Rowe had incurred, including setting up a new site at and redirecting traffic to MikeRoweforums.com, a now defunct website. Additionally, Microsoft provided Rowe with a subscription to the Microsoft Developer Network, an all-expenses-paid trip for him and his family to the Microsoft Research Tech Fest at their headquarters in Redmond, Washington, training for Microsoft certification and an Xbox with a selection of games. Following an online poll, Rowe donated most of his legal defense fund to Canuck Place, a hospice for terminally ill children, and used the remaining money for his future university education.

== Further developments ==
We take our trademark seriously, but in this case maybe a little too seriously.

— Microsoft spokesman Jim Desler

After settling the dispute with Microsoft, Rowe attempted to auction off the documentation he had received on the on-line auction site eBay, describing it as "a piece of Internet history". The materials included one copy of the original 25-page cease and desist letter, as well as an inch-thick WIPO book containing copies of trademarks, web pages and e-mails between him and Microsoft. The auction received more than half a million page views and bidding rose to more than $200,000. The high bids turned out to be fraudulent, and the auction was restricted to pre-approved bidders. After restarting from the reserve price of $500, the documents eventually sold for $1,037.

Microsoft later admitted that they may have been too aggressive in their defense of the "Microsoft" trademark. Following the case, it was suggested by Out-Law.com editor Struan Robertson that Microsoft had little choice but to pursue the issue once it had come to light, or they would have risked weakening their trademark. This view was also espoused by ZDNet, which noted that had Microsoft knowingly ignored Rowe's site, the company would have risked losing the right to fight future trademark infringements. Robertson opined that, had legal proceedings ensued, Rowe would have made a strong argument for keeping his domain, as he was using his real name and was not claiming to be affiliated with Microsoft.

== See also ==
- Apple Corps v. Apple Computer
- Microsoft Corp. v. Shah
- Nissan Motors v. Nissan Computer
