= Moseley v. V Secret Catalogue, Inc. =

- Supreme Court of the United States

Argued November 12, 2002 Decided March 4, 2003
- Full case name: Victor Moseley and Cathy Moseley, dba Victor's Little Secret, v. V Secret Catalogue, Inc., et al.
- Docket no.: 01-1015
- Citations: 537 U.S. 418 (more) 123 S. Ct. 1115; 155 L. Ed. 2d 1; 2003 U.S. LEXIS 1945; 65 U.S.P.Q.2d 1801

Case history
- Prior: V Secret Catalogue v. Moseley, 54 U.S.P.Q.2d 1092 (W.D. Ky. 2000); affirmed, 259 F.3d 464 (6th Cir. 2001); cert. granted, 535 U.S. 985 (2002).
- Subsequent: 558 F. Supp. 2d 734 (W.D. Ky. 2008) (judgment for V Secret, Supreme Court decision superseded by statute); aff'd 605 F.3d 382 (6th Cir. 2010); cert. denied, 562 U.S. 1179 (2011); rehearing denied, 562 U.S. 1280 (2011).

Holding
- A claim of trademark dilution requires evidence of actual dilution, not merely a likelihood of dilution

Court membership
- Chief Justice William Rehnquist Associate Justices John P. Stevens · Sandra Day O'Connor; Antonin Scalia · Anthony Kennedy; David Souter · Clarence Thomas; Ruth Bader Ginsburg · Stephen Breyer

Case opinions
- Majority: Stevens, joined by unanimous
- Concurrence: Kennedy

Laws applied
- Federal Trademark Dilution Act, 15 U.S.C. § 1125, 1127
- Superseded by
- Trademark Dilution Revision Act

Moseley v. V Secret Catalogue, Inc., 537 U.S. 418 (2003), is a decision by the Supreme Court of the United States holding that, under the Federal Trademark Dilution Act, a claim of trademark dilution requires proof of actual dilution, not merely a likelihood of dilution. This decision was later superseded by the Trademark Dilution Revision Act of 2006 (TDRA).

== Background ==
Trademark law in the United States was adopted from the common law of England and is part of the law of unfair competition. In 1925, an influential law review article described the dilution of trademarks through blurring where a product uses a name that is similar to a trademark and causes an erosion of its uniqueness. Starting in 1946, various states began to adopt anti-dilution provisions in their trademark statutes. The federal government followed suit in 1995 with the Federal Trademark Dilution Act (FTDA). This federal legislation applied to famous marks and made a party liable if it used a similar mark that diluted a famous mark's distinctiveness. However, the legislation did not define terms to establish what constituted a famous mark or articulate a clear standard for determining liability. As a result, as trademark cases were litigated in federal courts, a split developed between the different federal circuit appellate courts regarding issues such as what is a famous mark, whether a regional mark could be a famous mark, and whether a dilution claim required proof of economic harm to the trademark holder.

Victoria's Secret, a registered trademark owned by V Secret Catalogue, Inc., was found in 1988 to market moderately priced high quality lingerie in stores designed to look like a woman's bedroom. By 1998 the company spent $55 million in advertising its brand, operated 750 Victoria's Secret stores, including two in Louisville, Kentucky, and distributed 400 million copies of its catalogue.

In 1998 a weekly publication distributed to residents at Fort Knox, Kentucky, contained an ad for the grand opening of a store called Victor's Secret that was owned by Victor and Cathy Moseley which sold lingerie and adult novelties and gifts. An army colonel who saw the ad was offended by what he perceived to be an attempt to use a reputable company's trademark to sell "unwholesome, tawdry merchandise" and contacted Victoria's Secret, which then requested the Moseleys to immediately discontinue the use of the name Victor's Secret and "any variations thereof." In response the Moseleys changed the name of the store to Victor's Little Secret. Unsatisfied with this name change, Victoria's Secret filed suit in the District Court for the Western District of Kentucky alleging, among other claims, a violation of the FTDA. The district court, noting that Moseleys did not dispute that the trademark was famous, found in an unpublished opinion that the two names were sufficiently similar to cause dilution and that the Victor's Secret mark diluted the Victoria's Secret mark through its tarnishing effect. The court prohibited the Moseleys from using the Victor's Little Secret name because it tarnished the Victoria's Secret trademark.

The Sixth Circuit Circuit Court of Appeals affirmed the lower court decision, but noted that after the district court's decision the circuit court had adopted standards for determining dilution under the FTDA based on a test accepted in a Second Circuit case. Under this test, the Sixth Circuit Court determined that it was not necessary to establish that any economic harm had occurred as a result of the dilution. The Sixth Circuit Court in its opinion considered and rejected a Fourth Circuit case which held that proof of actual economic damages was necessary for a trademark dilution claim to prevail under the FTDA. Because of the difference between the circuits on this issue, the Supreme Court granted certiorari to resolve the legal conflict.

== Opinion ==
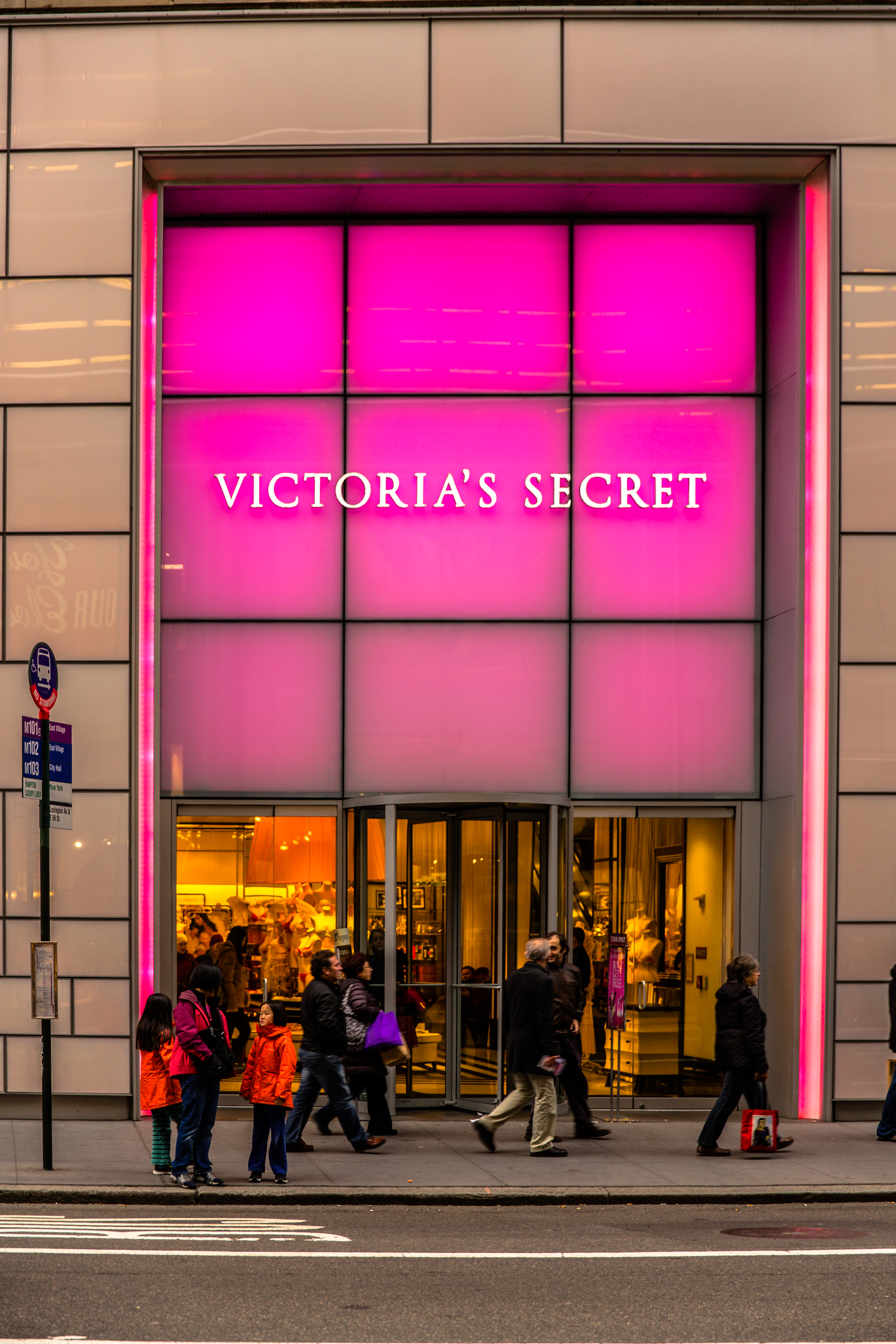
A store showing the Victoria's Secret trademark. The Supreme Court held that a claim of trademark dilution requires evidence of actual dilution.

The opinion by Justice Stevens noted that under the FTDA the owner of a trademark may obtain an injunction if another person's commercial use of a mark or trade name "causes dilution of the distinctive quality" of the famous mark. As the definition of dilution in the FTDA is described as the "lessening of the capacity of the famous mark" and "likelihood of confusion, mistake, or deception," the Court held that the FTDA requires proof of actual dilution. However, this proof did not necessarily include actual loss of sales or profit, as the Fourth Circuit had held. Instead, the owner of the trademark could use surveys or other circumstantial evidence of dilution. As Victoria's Secret did not provide evidence of actual dilution, the judgment of the circuit court was reversed.

Justice Scalia joined the majority opinion with the exception of one section which discussed the interpretation of the FTDA.

Justice Kennedy filed a concurring opinion which noted that Victoria's Secret was not foreclosed from obtaining injunctive relief on remand of the case.

== Subsequent events ==
Following the remand of the case to district court, Congress in 2006 passed the Trademark Dilution Revision Act, which essentially overturned the Supreme Court's Moseley decision. The district court applied the new law and granted summary judgment in favor of Victoria's Secret and issued an injunction against the use of the name Victor's Little Secret. This decision was appealed up to the Supreme Court again, but was not granted certiorari. After an injunction in 2000, the name of the store was changed to Cathy's Little Secret and maintained that name.

== See also ==
- List of United States Supreme Court cases, volume 537
- List of trademark case law
