= Zuccarini =

Zuccarini is a surname. Notable people with the surname include:

- John Zuccarini (born 1947), American businessman convicted of violating the Truth in Domain Names Act
- Joseph Gerhard Zuccarini (1797–1848), German botanist
- Oliviero Zuccarini (1883–1971), Italian journalist, politician, and activist
