= TDRA =

TDRA may represent:

- Telecommunications and Digital Government Regulatory Authority
- Trademark Dilution Revision Act
- Transitional Darfur Regional Authority
- Theory of dual radiation action
