= Anticybersquatting Consumer Protection Act =

1999 American law

The Anticybersquatting Consumer Protection Act (ACPA), 15 U.S.C. § 1125(d), (passed as part of Pub. L. 106–113 (text) (PDF)) is a U.S. law enacted in 1999 that established a cause of action for registering, trafficking in, or using a domain name confusingly similar to, or dilutive of, a trademark or personal name. The law was designed to thwart "cybersquatters" who register Internet domain names containing trademarks with no intention of creating a legitimate web site, but instead plan to sell the domain name to the trademark owner or a third party. Critics of the ACPA complain about the non-global scope of the Act and its potential to restrict free speech, while others dispute these complaints. Before the ACPA was enacted, trademark owners relied heavily on the Federal Trademark Dilution Act (FTDA) to sue domain name registrants. The FTDA was enacted in 1995 in part with the intent to curb domain name abuses. The legislative history of the FTDA specifically mentions that trademark dilution in domain names was a matter of Congressional concern motivating the Act. Senator Leahy stated that "it is my hope that this anti-dilution statute can help stem the use of deceptive Internet addresses taken by those who are choosing marks that are associated with the products and reputations of others".

For example, in Panavision Int'l L.P. v. Toeppen, 141 F.3d 1316 (9th Cir. 1998), Dennis Toeppen registered the domain name Panavision.com. Panavision, the trademark owner, learned that Toeppen had registered its trademark when it attempted to register the trademark "Panavision" as a domain name. Toeppen was using the domain panavision.com to display photographs of Pana, Illinois, and, when asked to cease, he offered to sell the domain name to Panavision for $13,000. After Panavision refused to buy the domain name from Toeppen, he registered its other trademark, Panaflex, as a domain name. The Court held that the FTDA could be violated without the traditional tarnishing or blurring the courts had required. Rulings like this extended the FTDA substantially.

== Overview ==
Under the ACPA, a trademark owner may bring a cause of action against a domain name registrant who:

- Has a bad faith intent to profit from the mark
- Registers, traffics in, or uses a domain name that is
  - Identical or confusingly similar to a distinctive mark
  - Identical or confusingly similar to or dilutive of a famous mark
  - Is a trademark protected by 18 U.S.C. § 706 (marks involving the Red Cross) or 36 U.S.C. § 220506 (marks related to the "Olympics")

A trademark is famous if the owner can prove that the mark "is widely recognized by the general consuming public of the United States as a designation of source of the goods or services of the mark's owner".

"Trafficking" in the context of domain names includes, but is not limited to "sales, purchases, loans, pledges, licenses, exchanges of currency, and any other transfer for consideration or receipt in exchange for consideration". The ACPA also requires that the mark be distinctive or famous at the time of registration.

In determining whether the domain name registrant has a bad faith intent to profit, a court may consider many factors, including nine that are outlined in the statute:

1. Registrant's trademark or other intellectual property rights in the domain name;
2. Whether the domain name contains the registrant's legal or common name;
3. Registrant's prior use of the domain name in connection with the bona fide offering of goods or services;
4. Registrant's bona fide noncommercial or fair use of the mark in a site accessible by the domain name;
5. Registrant's intent to divert customers from the mark owner's online location that could harm the goodwill represented by the mark, for commercial gain or with the intent to tarnish or disparage the mark;
6. Registrant's offer to transfer, sell, or otherwise assign the domain name to the mark owner or a third party for financial gain, without having used the mark in a legitimate site;
7. Registrant's providing misleading false contact information when applying for registration of the domain name;
8. Registrant's registration or acquisition of multiple domain names that are identical or confusingly similar to marks of others; and
9. Extent to which the mark in the domain is distinctive or famous.

The ACPA does not prevent the fair use of trademarks or any use protected by the First Amendment, which includes gripe sites. In Mayflower Transit, L.L.C. v. Prince, 314 F. Supp. 2d 362 (D.N.J 2004), the court found that the first two prongs of Mayflower's ACPA claim were easily met because (1) their registered trademark was distinctive and (2) Defendant's "mayflowervanline.com" was confusingly similar to Plaintiff's Mayflower trademark. However, when the court was examining the third prong of Plaintiff's ACPA claim, whether Defendant registered its domain name with the bad faith intent to profit from Plaintiff, the court found Defendant had a bona fide noncommercial use of the mark, therefore, the ACPA claim failed. "Defendant's motive for registering the disputed domain names was to express his customer dissatisfaction through the medium of the Internet."

The domain name registrar or registry or other domain name authority is not liable for injunctive or monetary relief except in the case of bad faith or reckless disregard.

While § 1125 protects trademark owners, 15 U.S.C. § 1129 protects any living person from having their personal name included in a domain name, but only when the domain name is registered for profitable resale.

The Ninth Circuit Court of Appeals caused a stir in 2013 when it held, in Petroliam Nasional Berhad (Petronas) v. GoDaddy.com, 737 F.3d 546 (9th Cir. 2013), petition for cert. denied 135 S.Ct. 55 (2014), that there is no cause of action for contributory cybersquatting, i.e. secondary liability under the ACPA. It so held notwithstanding the extensive body of case law permitting such liability where a registrar is shown to have acted outside the normal ministerial bounds of domain registration. It also relied on Central Bank of Denver v. First Interstate Bank of Denver and premised on the Circuit Court's determination that the ACPA is not part of the Lanham Act and therefore not included in the rule permitting secondary liability for trademark infringement enunciated in Inwood Labs v. Ives Labs, 456 U.S. 844 (1982).

== In rem jurisdiction ==
The ACPA also provides that the trademark owner can file an in rem action against the domain name in the judicial district where the domain name registrar, domain name registry, or other domain name authority registered or assigned the domain name is located if:

- (1) the domain name violates any right of the trademark owner and
- (2) the court finds that the owner
  - (a) is not able to obtain in personam jurisdiction over the person who would have been a defendant under 15 U.S.C. § 1125(d)(1); or
  - (b) through due diligence was not able to find a person who would have been a defendant under 15 U.S.C. § 1125(d)(1) by sending a notice of the alleged violation and publishing notice of the action.

This provision is rarely used, however, because many trademark owners can achieve the same results through a Uniform Domain-Name Dispute-Resolution Policy (UDRP) proceeding.

== ACPA v. UDRP ==
Instead of suing in federal court under the ACPA, a trademark owner can choose to pursue an administrative proceeding under ICANN's Uniform Domain Name Dispute Resolution Policy (UDRP). The UDRP allows a trademark owner to challenge domain name registrations in expedited administrative proceedings.

A UDRP proceeding can be faster and cheaper for trademark owners than an ACPA lawsuit. Also, UDRP outcomes tend to be pro-plaintiff because many UDRP arbitrators are trademark lawyers. However, some trademark owners prefer to bring ACPA claims because they offer more remedies than the cancellation or transfer of the domain name (the only remedies available under UDRP proceedings) and a court ruling can lead to a final resolution of the matter. Also, a suit under the ACPA may deter future cybersquatters more effectively than a UDRP proceeding.

== Domaining and the ACPA ==
While the ACPA contemplated the purchase of domain names for resale to trademark owners, it did not contemplate the more modern practice of domaining. Domaining is the business of registering a domain name and parking it or placing pay-per-click ads on it. Domainers rely on type-in traffic, which is when Internet surfers type in the domain name rather than using a search engine. Domainers can make a lot of money by buying and selling domain names.

Some domainers relied on domain tasting, which involves placing pay-per-click ads on the domain for five days (or less) to determine whether the ads will make more than the annual cost of the domain. If the domain is dropped within the five-day grace period, no fee is incurred. An industry has grown up out of this business with domainers taking part in these mass registrations. This practice was largely eliminated by 2009, when ICANN began raising fees to registrars with excessive domain tasting.

In Verizon California, Inc. v. Navigation Catalyst Systems, 568 F. Supp. 2d 1088 (C.D. Cal. 2008), the domainer lost under the ACPA. One of the defendants, Basic Fusion, Inc. argued that they were not cybersquatters, but as an Internet registrar accredited by ICANN they could register domain names on behalf of its customers and it specialized in "bulk registration". Navigation Catalyst Systems, another defendant and a customer of Basic Fusion, used their "proprietary automated tool" to find domain names that were not already registered and then registered them using Basic Fusion. Navigation used the five days following the registration (the "advertisement grace period") to put advertisements on the websites making money from the advertisements even when they dropped the domain name registration before the five-day window closed. Plaintiff Verizon argued that defendants "registered" 1,392 domain names that were confusingly similar to plaintiff's trademarks. The Court found that defendants used the confusingly similar domain names with a bad faith intent to profit.

== See also ==
- Microsoft Corp. v. Shah
