= Michael Rowe =

Mike or Michael Rowe may refer to:

- Michael Rowe (screenwriter), television writer for Futurama
- Michael Rowe (actor), Canadian actor
- Michael Rowe (director) (born 1971), Australian Mexican film director
- Mike Rowe (born 1962), host of the Discovery Channel show Dirty Jobs
- Mike Rowe (ice hockey) (born 1965), Canadian retired ice hockey player
- Mike Rowe, defendant in the case of Microsoft v. MikeRoweSoft
- Michael Rowe (journalist) (born 1962), author
- Mike Rowe (racing driver), American racing driver
- Mike Rowe, keyboard player in Noel Gallagher's High Flying Birds

== See also ==
- Michael Roe (disambiguation)
