= Navigation Catalyst Systems =

Navigation Catalyst Systems, previously known as Vendare, First Look, and qsrch.net, was a pay-per-click advertising company that specialized in monetizing parked domain names and registrars' wildcard DNS records. Navigation Catalyst Systems was a subsidiary of New.net and an affiliate of the ICANN-accredited registrar Basic Fusion.

== Lawsuit ==
In 2007, Navigation Catalyst Systems, along with its affiliate registrar Basic Fusion, was sued by Verizon for the registration and domain tasting of 1,392 domain names incorporating Verizon's trademarks (Verizon California, Inc. v. Navigation Catalyst Systems, Inc., 2008 WL 2651163 (C.D. Cal. June 30, 2008). Navigation argued that it did not register the domain names in bad faith because it had used a proprietary software tool that, through both manual and automatic means, "scrubbed" its registered domains for registered trademarks. It claimed that it was merely "reserving" the domain names by taking advantage of Basic Fusion's Add Grace Period. Basic Fusion attempted to argue that it was not the same legal entity as Navigation Catalyst Systems, but the court stated that they were the same for the purposes of a preliminary injunction motion.

Navigation further asserted an unclean hands defense, arguing that Verizon used a similar pay-per-click program to monetize its wildcard DNS records. The court rejected both arguments and ultimately granted a preliminary injunction against Navigation Catalyst Systems. In so doing, the court held that Navigation Catalyst Systems had intended to profit in bad faith from the typographical errors of Internet users that mistyped Verizon's trademarks in the URL bar of their web browsers:

It is clear that their intent was to profit from the poor typing abilities of consumers trying to reach Plaintiffs' sites: what other value could there be in a name like ve3rizon.com? Further, the sites associated with these names often contained links to products directly competitive with Plaintiffs' cellphone and internet businesses, potentially diverting consumers who would otherwise have purchased goods or services from Plaintiffs away from Plaintiffs.
