= NUANS =

NUANS is a computerized search service in Canada for comparison of proposed corporate names or trademarks. In order to federally incorporate a company in Canada, a business owner must ensure that their proposed corporate name or trademark does not infringe on other intellectual property holders. A NUANS report is required for listing existing company names that closely match a proposed company name to identify potential name confusion.
