= Federal Trademark Dilution Act =

Federal Trademark Dilution Act of 1995
- Long title: An Act to amend the Trademark Act of 1946 to make certain revisions relating to the protection of famous marks.
- Enacted by: the 104th United States Congress

Citations
- Public law: Pub. L. 104-98
- Statutes at Large: 109 Stat. 985

Legislative history
- Introduced in the House as H.R. 1295 by Carlos Moorhead on March 22, 1995; Signed into law by President Bill Clinton on January 16, 1996

The Federal Trademark Dilution Act of 1995 (Pub. L. 104–98 (text) (PDF)) is a United States federal law which protects famous trademarks from uses that dilute their distinctiveness, even in the absence of any likelihood of confusion or competition. It went into effect on January 16, 1996. This act has been largely supplanted by the Trademark Dilution Revision Act of 2006 (TDRA), signed into law on October 6, 2006.

== Summary ==
Trademark dilution occurs when a use of a trademark by someone other than its owner impairs the mark's distinctiveness, whether or not the mark is used on a competing product or in a way that is likely to cause customer confusion.

A distinction is made between trademark dilution and trademark infringement. Infringement occurs when someone other than a trademark's owner uses the mark in a way that is likely to cause customer confusion. For example, if someone other than the Kodak corporation started marketing film under the mark KODAK, customers would probably be confused, because customers have come to associate KODAK film with a specific source and would probably believe that any KODAK film they see comes from that source.

If however, another company started marketing KODAK brand pianos, there might be little or no customer confusion, because customers would probably recognize that Kodak is unlikely to branch into the piano business or to use its film brand name on pianos. So customers would probably recognize that the KODAK pianos come from a different source. However, the KODAK pianos might still harm Kodak, because it would lessen the strong association, which the company has spent billions of dollars creating, between the word KODAK and film. Some customers, upon seeing the mark KODAK, would no longer instantly think of film—some would think of pianos instead. This lessening of the association between "KODAK" and "film" is trademark dilution.

Many states have long had statutory protection against trademark dilution. Until 1996, federal law protected only against trademark infringement. In that year, the FTDA took effect and provided federal protection against trademark dilution.

Until 2006, the FTDA was distinguished from most state trademark dilution laws in several ways: (1) The FTDA protects only "famous" trademarks; most state statutes do not explicitly require trademarks to be "famous" to be protected against dilution. (2) The FTDA, as interpreted by the Supreme Court, protected only against "actual" dilution of a trademark, whereas most state statutes provided trademark owners with a remedy whenever they could show a "likelihood" of dilution. (3) The Supreme Court suggested (although it did not have occasion to hold) that the FTDA protected only against dilution by "blurring" and not against dilution by "tarnishment" (see below).

Amendments to the FTDA took effect on October 6, 2006. The Act still protects only famous marks. However, Congress amended the act so that it expressly provides protection against a use of a mark that is "likely" to cause dilution. The new statute thus eliminates the requirement of proving "actual dilution."

In addition, the amended statute specifically protects against dilution by "blurring" and dilution by "tarnishment." Dilution by "tarnishment" occurs when association arising from the similarity between a mark or trade name and a famous mark harms the reputation of the famous mark.

== Definition of dilution ==
The new act defines the term "dilution" as "the lessening of the capacity of a famous mark to identify and distinguish goods or services, regardless of the presence or absence of

(1) competition between the owner of the famous mark and other parties, or
(2) likelihood of confusion, mistake, or deception."

Courts have previously found that dilution can occur as a result of either "blurring" or "tarnishment". "Blurring" typically refers to the "whittling away" of distinctiveness caused by the unauthorized use of a mark on dissimilar products; while "tarnishment" involves an unauthorized use of a mark which links it to products that are of poor quality or which is portrayed in an unwholesome or unsavory context that is likely to reflect adversely upon the owner's product. The legislative history suggests that both of these concepts are encompassed within the new law. In addition, the legislative history cites, as examples of the uses which would fall within the new law, the mark DUPONT for shoes, BUICK for aspirin and KODAK for pianos.

== Remedy - Injunctive Relief ==
Ordinarily, only injunctive relief is available under the new law. However, if the defendant willfully intended to trade on the owner's reputation or to cause dilution of the famous mark, the owner of that mark may also be entitled to other remedies available under the United States Trademark Act, including defendant's profits, damages, attorneys' fees, and destruction of the infringing goods. The availability of monetary relief is a striking departure from state dilution laws, which have typically provided only for injunctive relief. The new law also provides that the ownership of a valid federal registration is a complete bar to the assertion of a dilution claim under state law, thereby effectively pre-empting state dilution claims against registered marks.

== First Amendment concerns ==
In response to First Amendment concerns, the new law expressly exempts certain uses of a famous mark, in particular:

(1) "fair use" of a mark in the context of comparative commercial advertising or promotion;
(2) non-commercial uses, such as parody, satire and editorial commentary; and
(3) all forms of news reporting and news commentary.

== Conclusions ==
Although approximately 25 states have already enacted laws that prohibit trademark dilution, this new federal law is intended to provide uniform and nationwide protection for famous marks. Thus, the new law renders academic the unsettled question of whether a state dilution claim can support injunctive relief against use in another state in which there is no dilution statute. Nevertheless, what constitutes a "famous" mark is likely to generate controversy in the courts and in the Trademark Office and may well slow the trademark clearance and registration process, as parties seek to settle what constitutes a "famous" mark. In addition, courts have traditionally dismissed state dilution claims unless there is also a finding of infringement or unfair competition based upon a likelihood of confusion. It remains to be seen how courts and the Trademark Office will interpret this new federal law, which has potentially far-reaching applications.
