= Michael Roe (disambiguation) =

Michael Roe (born 1954) is an American musician.

Michael Roe may also refer to:

- Michael Roe (historian) (born 1931), Australian historian and academic
- Michael Roe (racing driver) (born 1955), Irish former racing driver
- Michael Roe (badminton) (born 1995), English badminton player

== See also ==
- Michael Roes (born 1960), German writer
- Michael Rowe (disambiguation)
