= Taubman Co. v. Webfeats =

The Taubman Company v. Webfeats
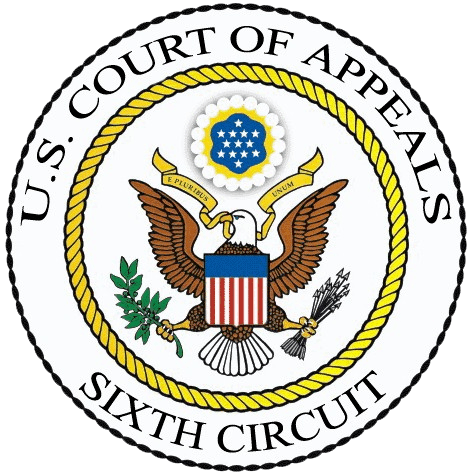
- Court: United States Court of Appeals for the Sixth Circuit
- Full case name: The Taubman Company v. Webfeats and Henry Mishkoff
- Argued: October 16 2002
- Decided: February 7 2003
- Citation: 319 F.3d 770

Holding
- Held that, in the context of an injunction application, speech critical of plaintiff's business was protected by the First Amendment, and could not be blocked by the Lanham Act.

Court membership
- Judges sitting: Danny Julian Boggs, Richard Fred Suhrheinrich, and Eric L. Clay

Laws applied
- U.S. Const. amend. I, Lanham Act

Taubman Co. v. Webfeats, 319 F.3d 770, 778 (6th Cir. 2003) was a United States Court of Appeals for the Sixth Circuit case concerning trademark infringement under the Lanham Act due to the unauthorized use of a domain name and website. The appellate court held that Taubman's trademark infringement claim did not have a likelihood of success and that the use of the company's mark in the domain name was an exhibition of free speech.

Taubman Co. v. Webfeats became the first federal appellate court case that addressed the phenomenon of "cybergriping". The legal battle also evolved into a civil liberties case, attracting the attention of organizations such as the American Civil Liberties Union (ACLU) and the nonprofit advocacy group Public Citizen.

== Facts ==
Taubman Company Limited Partnership announced that it was building a shopping mall called The Shops at Willow Bend at Plano, Texas. When Henry Mishkoff heard of the construction, which was near his home, he created a website using a domain called shopsatwillowbend.com. It featured information about the mall, including maps directing visitors to its shops. Taubman Company immediately filed a lawsuit before the U.S. District Court for the Eastern District of Michigan and sent Mishkoff a cease-and-desist letter after learning of the website. Mishkoff, who is a web developer, responded to the legal maneuver by registering new websites with derogatory domain names such as theshopatwillowbendsucks.com and taubmansucks.com. The plaintiff also asked the court to stop Mishkoff from using the web names attached to sucks.com. It is considered as a "complaint name" and the process is also known as "cybergriping", a phenomenon described as an Internet buzzword for a website that criticizes organizations, individuals, products, and services.

The federal district court granted the plaintiff's petition for preliminary injunction and ordered the defendant to cease and desist from using the shopsatwillowbend.com domain and website as well as the other registered gripe domains. Mishkoff secured representation from Paul Alan Levy at Public Citizen and appealed the case to the U.S. Court of Appeals for the 6th Circuit.

== Ruling ==
According to the Court of Appeals, Mishkoff erred in claiming two assignments of error: that the U.S. District Court did not have jurisdiction over him; and, that the plaintiff's trademark claim will not succeed because it cannot demonstrate customer confusion regarding the origin of Taubman and Mishkoff's products. However, the court dissolved the lower court's injunctions. It ruled that Taubman's mark in Mishkoff's website is purely an exhibition of Free Speech and not a violation cited in the Lanham Act. The court acknowledged that defendant's websites might lead to economic damage but his right to do so is protected by the First Amendment, particularly since it falls under critical commentary without any confusion as to the source. A detailed account of the litigation appears at taubmansucks.com.
