= Stefan Hakenberg =

- Born: Wuppertal, Germany
- Education: Hochschule für Musik Köln
- Alma mater: Harvard University (Ph.D.)
- Occupation: Composer
- Known for: Integration of non-Western classical performers; founder of CrossSound
- Notable work: Klanott and the Land Otter People
- Spouse: Jocelyn Clark
- Awards: ASCAP–Chamber Music America Award for Adventurous Programming; NEA Creativity Grant

Stefan Hakenberg is a composer. He was born in Wuppertal, Germany, and currently lives in Juneau, Alaska. Reviewers have praised his music as "highly original," "dramatic and memorable," "creating strong musical expressions in a densely contrapuntal style." The integration of players of non-Western classical background has particularly shaped Hakenberg's creative thought. His work is an ongoing reflection on musical styles of today that he finds along an international career path that has taken him from Cologne in the 80s to Boston in the 90s to Seoul at the turn of the millennium.

Stefan Hakenberg counts Hans Werner Henze, Bernard Rands, Mario Davidovsky and Oliver Knussen amongst his teachers. He studied at the Hochschule für Musik Köln and received his Ph.D. from Harvard University.

Stefan Hakenberg, together with his wife, kayagum player Jocelyn Clark, founded the Alaskan contemporary music organization "CrossSound," which won an ASCAP-Chamber Music America Award for Adventurous Programming, and received an NEA Creativity Grant for a program including Hakenberg's pansori "Klanott and the Land Otter People."

== Works ==
- Klanott and the Land Otter People a Southeast Alaskan p'ansori, in a prologue and five scenes after a story by Brett Dillingham, text by Chan Eung Park for P'ansori-singer, 3 violins, clarinet, bass clarinet, horn, drum, and Zheng (2005)
- Ein Gesang der Loreley for violin, alto flute and clarinet (in A) - (2004)
- It Lightens, It Brightens . . . for bass recorder, kayagûm, bass-koto and cello (2003)
- Der Nachmittag eines Gärtners for erhu, cello, recorder, accordion, kayagûm and marimba (2002)
- Small Craft for flute, violin, viola and euphonium (2001)
- Wild Landscape and Underbrush for wind quintet (2000)
- Sir Donald for cello, kayagûm, and changgu (1999)
- Three Zithers and a Pair of Scissors five montages for Koto, Kayagûm, changgu and zheng (1998)
- Bug Snatches Spider for violin, viola, cello, contrabass, flute, clarinet/bass clarinet, horn, percussion, and piano (1997)
- Cube for bass clarinet, drums, and cello (1996)
- Drei Stücke for brass quintet (1994)
- Emergence for bass clarinet and percussion (1993)

== Recordings ==
- 2008: S. Hakenberg: The Egg Musher - S. Taglietti: Memoirs of Elagabalus El Cimarrón Ensemble VDM Records
