= Trademark law of Oman =

Registered trademarks in Oman are governed by the Industrial Property Law issued by Royal Decree No 67/2008 which was later amended by Royal Decree No 131/2008.

== History of Trademark Law in Oman ==
The first trademark law in Oman was issued in the year 1987 and was the very first intellectual property law to be passed in the country. This law was replaced by the Law of Trademarks, Trade Data, Trade Secrets, and The Protection Against Unfair Competition in the year 2000 which was issued as part of the process of Oman's accession to the WTO. This law was later repealed by the current comprehensive Industrial Property Law issued in 2008 as part of Oman's prerequisites for the entry into force of the Free Trade Agreement signed with the USA.

== Trademark Protection ==
=== Definition of a Trademark ===
Article one of the Industrial Property Law states that a mark is any mark capable of graphical representation in a definite manner and capable of distinguishing the goods and services offered by an establishment from those of offered by another. The law explicitly provides that the mark may be made up of words, drawings, letters, colors, collections of colors, numbers, product shape or the shape of its content, geographical indications, sounds, scents, flavors, and slogans if not long enough to be protected by copyright.

=== Requirements for Registration ===
A mark has to be capable of distinguishing the goods and services it is applied to from those made by another establishment. Marks which are incapable of being distinguished will not be registered. If the attribute that makes the mark distinguishable is an attribute derived from the normal formation of the good (such as its smell or taste), that attribute will not be sufficient for satisfying this requirement. However, the court may decide that a mark has acquired a secondary meaning sufficient to make the mark capable of distinguishing the goods or services through the continuous use of that mark in the market. Words which are commonly used by the public to refer to the type of good or service, and words of a technical nature used to describe the good or service, cannot satisfy the requirement for a mark to be capable of distinguishing the good or service from those of another establishment.

=== Marks Banned From Registration ===
The Omani Industrial Property Law bans the registration of the following kind of marks:

- Marks that are scandalous or immoral.
- Marks that may confuse or mislead the public.
- Marks that are identical to an official emblem or logo adopted by any government or international organization.

=== Duration of Protection ===
Trademark registration lasts for an initial period of 10 years which may be renewed indefinitely.

=== Rights of the Trademark Owner ===
The owner of a trademark has the following rights:

1. The right to stop others from applying a similar or identical mark to goods or service related to those for which the mark has been registered, if there is a chance for confusion in relation to that use.
2. The right to take legal action against anybody using the trademark without his permission or takes any action that may lead to the violation of his trademark.

== Collective Marks ==
The Omani law defines collective marks as any mark for a groups such as cooperative groups, associations, or industrial, producers, or trade unions. The same rules that apply to regular trademarks apply to collective marks. The application for a collective mark must provide the conditions for using the mark if such conditions exist.

== Certification Marks ==
The Omani law defines certification marks as any mark or group of marks that disclose a unique attribute such as the type, origin, or production method used by others under the supervisions of the owner of the mark. The same rules that apply to regular trademarks apply to certification marks. Any person who satisfies the conditions and technical standards for using the certification mark has the right to use that mark.
