= Out-Law.com =

Legal news and information site

Out-Law.com is a legal news and information site developed by international law firm Pinsent Masons. It publishes daily news and plain-English guides covering developments in business law.

Established in 2000, as a resource for technology companies, it re-launched in 2011 covering all aspects of business law. It offers over 15,000 pages of news and guidance and is believed to attract more traffic than the website of any other law firm and is more widely used than many more traditional legal news sources.

In 2008, Out-Law.com won a Webby Award for the "Best Law Website", the first law firm’s website to win such an award.

Out-Law.com is produced by a team of journalists and is freely accessible. Its news is delivered by the website, by RSS feeds, by Twitter feeds and it publishes over 500 legal guides, plus an archive of podcast Out-Law Radio, which is on hiatus.
