= Trademark Dilution Revision Act =

2006 United States law

The Trademark Dilution Revision Act of 2006 (H.R. 683, Pub. L. 109–312 (text) (PDF)) was a law passed in the United States covering trademark law, and specifically dealt with trademark dilution.

The act amended the Trademark Act of 1946 and the later Federal Trademark Dilution Act, and was passed through the United States House of Representatives on April 19, followed by the Senate (who amended it) on March 8. It was signed into law by the then-President George W. Bush on October 6, 2006. It was primarily designed to overturn the U.S. Supreme Court decision in Moseley v. V Secret Catalogue, Inc., which had specified a need to show actual trademark dilution, rather than the likelihood of dilution. It also amended U.S. law in this area in a few other ways. It limited protection from trademark dilution to those recognized by a member of the general public, rather than one in a niche market, for example an area relevant to either or both products. It also amended the fair use defense, and added an express defense for noncommercial use.
