= John Zuccarini =

American businessman (born 1947)

John Zuccarini (born September 20, 1947) is an American businessman who served time in federal prison for violating the Truth in Domain Names Act. Zuccarini operated a domain name speculation business. He is reported as owning 5500 domains before his arrest.

== Domain name speculation ==
A domain investor registers or buys generic domain names that have the predicted potential to be sought after by another person or receive type in traffic by people expecting to find keyword related content. Zuccarini, however, registered thousands of domains that were close misspellings or "typos" of popular sites such as Cartoon Network and Homestar Runner or even acquired domains identical to well-known brands such as Hot Wheels, which is the modality of a cybersquatter as opposed to a domain investor.

== Prosecution ==
Companies holding brands misrepresented by Zuccarini have taken overwhelming action against him through dozens of arbitration cases pursuant to the UDRP and state and federal lawsuits.

The Federal Trade Commission in October 2001 charged Zuccarini's business practices violated federal law and sought an injunction. A federal court granted an injunction that "permanently bars the defendant from: redirecting or obstructing consumers on the Internet in connection with the advertising, promoting, offering for sale, selling, or providing any goods or services on the Internet, the World Wide Web or any Web page or Web site; and launching the Web sites of others without their permission", and ordered Zuccarini to relinquish nearly $1.9 million in gains. After this decision, Zuccarini fled the U.S. for the Bahamas.

In 2003, the Truth in Domain Names Act was passed to address concerns created by Zuccarini. The law makes it a federal crime for "whoever knowingly uses a misleading domain name on the Internet with the intent to deceive a person into viewing material constituting obscenity" and "whoever knowingly uses a misleading domain name on the Internet with the intent to deceive a minor into viewing material that is harmful to minors on the Internet". On September 3, 2003, Zuccarini was arrested in Room 448 of a Holiday Inn in Hollywood, Florida, where he had been living for 10 months. It had been assumed that Zuccarini remained in the Bahamas. Zuccarini became the first man prosecuted under the new legislation. On December 10, 2003, John Zuccarini pleaded guilty and was sentenced to 2½ years in prison on February 26, 2004. Zuccarini was released on November 4, 2005.
