= Gripe site =

Website dedicated to critique and or mockery

A gripe site is a type of website that is dedicated to critique or complaint about a specific subject. The subject could be a person, place, politician, corporation, institution, or something else. A gripe site may aim to offer constructive criticism to the subject (like an open letter), or may simply lampoon the subject.

Some websites "position themselves as places where consumers can post complaints", providing coverage of "a wide range of consumer markets". In addition to providing a forum for the posting of complaints, such sites may also "offer general guidelines about where to complain and how to do it", and "provide links, snail-mail addresses and even names for places and people" to whom complaints can be directed. Other gripe sites may be dedicated to a single business, and "some major suppliers do monitor gripe sites", albeit not for the benefit of those who are complaining.

A 2021 report found that some companies advertising reputation management services to remove slanderous information from gripe sites were actually working in collaboration with those sites. Companies with such a relationship, the report speculated, would charge a substantial amount to get information removed from one gripe site while facilitating the appearance of that information on another gripe site, in order to continue charging for further removals.

== See also ==
- royaldutchshellplc.com
