= Trademark dilution =

Act that weakens a trademark's uniqueness

Trademark dilution is a trademark law concept giving the owner of a famous trademark standing to forbid others from using that mark in a way that would lessen its uniqueness. In most cases, trademark dilution involves an unauthorized use of another's trademark on products that do not compete with, and have little connection with, those of the trademark owner. For example, a famous trademark used by one company to refer to hair care products might be diluted if another company began using a similar mark to refer to breakfast cereals or spark plugs.

Dilution is a basis of trademark infringement that applies only to famous marks. With a non-famous mark, the owner of the mark must show that the allegedly infringing use creates a likelihood of confusion as to the source of the product or service being identified by the allegedly infringing use: it is highly unlikely a likelihood of confusion will be found if the products or services are in unrelated markets. With a famous mark, any other use has the potential for confusion, since consumers may assume affiliation with the owner of the mark regardless of the product or service.

== Background ==
Trademark law traditionally concerned itself with situations where an unauthorized party sold goods that are directly competitive with or at least related to those sold by the trademark owner. A trademark is diluted when the use of similar or identical trademarks in other non-competing markets means that the trademark in and of itself will lose its capacity to signify a single source. In other words, unlike ordinary trademark law, dilution protection extends to trademark uses that do not confuse consumers regarding who has made a product. Instead, dilution protection law aims to protect sufficiently strong trademarks from losing their singular association in the public mind with a particular product, perhaps imagined if the trademark were to be encountered independently of any product (e.g., just the word Pepsi spoken, or on a billboard).

== Requirements for protection ==
The strength required for a trademark to deserve dilution protection differs among jurisdictions, though it generally includes the requirement that it must be distinctive, famous, or even unique. Such trademarks would include instantly recognizable brand names, such as Coca-Cola, Kleenex, Kool-Aid, or Sony, and unique terms that were invented (such as Exxon) rather than surnames (such as Ford or Zamboni) or ordinary words in language. Some jurisdictions require additional registration of these trademarks as defensive marks in order to qualify for dilution protection.

Another way of describing the necessary strength of a trademark may establish some basis for dilution protection from a consumer-confusion standpoint. Truly famous trademarks are likely to be seen in many different contexts due to branching out or simple sponsorship, to the extent that there may be very few markets, if any, that a consumer would be surprised to see that famous trademark involved in. A prime example may be the past involvement of Coca-Cola in clothing lines.

One further use of the protection of trademark dilution is for controversial images, including the Cleveland Guardians' former mascot and logo, Chief Wahoo, while the team was known as the Cleveland Indians at the time along with the Washington Commanders, formerly known as the Redskins. In those cases, a limited selection of merchandise is distributed solely in their physical team stores of their former controversial Native American logos, both to maintain the trademarks and prevent others from usurping them, and to null the further use of those logos in public.

== Blurring and tarnishment ==
Dilution is sometimes divided into two related concepts: blurring, or essentially basic dilution, which "blurs" a mark from association with only one product to signify other products in other markets (such as "Kodak shoes"); and tarnishment, which is the weakening of a mark through unsavory or unflattering associations. Not all dilution protection laws recognize tarnishment as an included concept.

== Laws by country ==
=== Canada ===
In Canada, the legal basis can be found in s. 22 of the Trade-marks Act:

22. (1) no person shall use a trade mark registered by another person in a manner that is likely to have the effect of depreciating the value of the goodwill attaching thereto. (2) In any action in respect of a use of a trade mark contrary to subsection (1), the court may decline to order the recovery of damages or profits and may permit the defendant to continue to sell wares marked with the trade-mark that were in his possession or under his control at the time notice was given to him that the owner of the registered trade-mark complained of the use of the trade-mark.

It is commonly acknowledged that goodwill is constituted by the reputation of a trade mark and its persuasive effect.

==== Application of Section 22 by Canadian Courts ====
In the Clairol case, the court stated that goodwill can be depreciated through "reduction of the esteem in which the mark itself is held or through the direct persuasion and enticing of customers who could otherwise be expected to buy or continue to buy goods bearing the trade mark". The court added that the test of confusion is irrelevant here and that the "test is the likelihood of depreciating the value of the goodwill attaching to the trade mark" and that this result could be obtained without actual deception/confusion.

S. 22 thus steps where confusion fails to tread. Even if there is no actual risk that the consumer might be confused between the two products, the trade mark owner will still be able to prevent another person from using his/her trade mark if that use is likely to depreciate the value of the trade mark.

In the Veuve Clicquot case, the trade mark of the famous French champagne was used by a small chain of women's clothing store that was trading in eastern Quebec and Ottawa. According to the court, s. 22 applies even where a defendant's wares or services do not compete with the plaintiff's and their mark are not identical. The marks were not identical ("Cliquot" and "Veuve clicquot") and the risk of confusing the champagne brand and a clothing store was low. However the court ruled that the only element needed was the ability of an average consumer to recognize the first distinctive character. Even if the trade mark is not that well known, the fact that a significant goodwill is attached to it might be enough for the court to find the use by another person unlawful. However, in that particular case, the court claimed that the plaintiff Veuve Clicquot failed to prove that the linkage between champagne and clothing was likely to cause depreciation.

In the Perrier case, the plaintiff, a French company, was the bottler and distributor of spring water. It sought an injunction to restrain another company base in Ontario from advertising and distributing bottled water in association with the name "Pierre eh!" claiming that the value of the goodwill attached to the French trade mark would likely be depreciated. The plaintiff succeeded on section 22 to stop the use of "Pierre Eh!" on bottled water.

==== Proving depreciation of goodwill ====
The plaintiff has to prove the elements of section 22, particularly that the use would likely depreciate the value of the goodwill of the claimant's mark. A precision has been made by Vaver, that the fact "that the use could well cause depreciation is not enough. The use must actually have caused depreciation".

==== Limits to the use of Section 22 ====
The use of Section 22 was restricted in the Clairol case to the use "in the technical trade-mark sense". For example, unions are allowed to use the trade mark to caricature because caricature or criticism is not a trade mark infringement, nor event a use of the trade mark, if it occurs outside "the normal course of trade". (see also The Michelin v CAW case. In that case, the court rejected the trade mark infringement argument because no one was planning on using the trade mark to sell a product).

=== Jordan ===
Trademark dilution is explained in Sections 8(12) and 25(1)(b) of the Jordanian Trade Mark Law.

=== United States ===
Prior to specifically targeted laws being adopted, dilution protection was used in some U.S. jurisdictions to attack domain name infringement of trademarks (see Cybersquatting). For example, in the 1998 case of Panavision International v. Toeppen, defendant Dennis Toeppen registered the domain name www.panavision.com, and posted aerial views of the city of Pana, Illinois, on the site. The Ninth Circuit Court of Appeals found that trademark dilution occurred when potential customers of Panavision could not find its web site at panavision.com, and instead were forced to search through other (less obvious) domain names. The fact that potential customers might be discouraged from locating Panavision's legitimate website, coupled with evidence that Toeppen was in the business of registering domain names for profit, led the court to find that Toeppen's conduct "diminished the capacity of the Panavision marks to identify and distinguish Panavision's goods and services on the Internet", and thus constituted dilution.

Lately, the Trademark Dilution Revision Act of 2006 (H.R. 683), was signed into law, which overturned Moseley v. V Secret Catalogue, Inc., 537 U.S. 418 (2003). Moseley held the plaintiff needed to prove actual dilution under the Federal Trademark Dilution Act ("FTDA"). The new law revises the FTDA, requiring the plaintiff to show only that the defendant's mark is likely to cause dilution. However, the revision also reduced the universe of marks falling under its protection, requiring that marks be nationally well known to qualify for protection from dilution.

For example, when Wolfe's Borough Coffee, Inc., a New Hampshire-based coffee company, sold its coffee under the trademarks that included the words "Charbucks Blend" and "Mr. Charbucks," Starbucks Corporation sued, claiming that the use of the word "Charbucks" diluted the "Starbucks" mark by both blurring and tarnishment. The Second Circuit Court of Appeals decided that marks need not be "substantially similar" under the FTDA for dilution to occur when other factors supporting a finding of dilution, such as the distinctiveness of the famous mark and the degree of its recognition, were present. In its decision, the court found that these other factors may be sufficient to support a dilution claim and remanded the case to the district court in order to determine whether dilution had in fact occurred. The district court ruled that sales of Charbucks did not violate the trademark and could continue.

=== China ===
Chinese statutes have not systematically provided for dilution, but enough elements are present in its administrative regulations to allow bringing anti-dilution claims through the well-known mark regulations. Under China rules, finding of well-known mark status can be made at a party’s request for specific cases, wherein the claimant must provide proof of use over five years. In the litigation Hunan Yong He Food Co. and Beijing ByteDance Technology Co. Ltd, well-known mark regulations rules in themselves provided basis to apply anti-dilution protection despite the absence of a statutory dilution cause of action and no requirement to prove likelihood of confusion.

== See also ==
- Generic trademark
- Disparagement
- Counteraction principle
