= Trademark =

Trade identifier of products or services

A trademark (also written trade mark or trade-mark) is a type of intellectual property that consists of a word, phrase, symbol, design, or combination thereof that identifies a product or service from a particular source and distinguishes it from others. Trademarks also extend to non-traditional marks like drawings, symbols, 3D shapes like product designs or packaging, sounds, scents, or specific colors used to create a unique identity. For example, Pepsi is a registered trademark associated with soft drinks, and the distinctive shape of the Coca-Cola bottle is a registered trademark protecting Coca-Cola's packaging design.

The primary function of a trademark is to identify the source of goods or services and prevent consumers from confusing them with those from other sources. Legal protection for trademarks is typically secured through registration with governmental agencies, such as the United States Patent and Trademark Office (USPTO) or the European Union Intellectual Property Office (EUIPO). Registration provides the owner certain exclusive rights and provides legal remedies against unauthorised use by others.

Trademark laws vary by jurisdiction but generally allow owners to enforce their rights against infringement, dilution, or unfair competition. International agreements, such as the Paris Convention and the Madrid Protocol, simplify the registration and protection of trademarks across multiple countries. Additionally, the TRIPS Agreement sets minimum standards for trademark protection and enforcement that all member countries must follow.

== Terminology ==
=== Trademarks ===
The term trademark can also be spelled trade mark in regions such as the EU, UK, and Australia, and as trade-mark in Canada. Despite the different spellings, all three terms denote the same concept.

In the United States, the Lanham Act defines a trademark as any word, phrase, symbol, design, or combination of these things used to identify goods or services. Trademarks help consumers recognise a brand in the marketplace and distinguish it from competitors. A service mark, also covered under the Lanham Act, is a type of trademark used to identify services rather than goods. The term trademark is used to refer to both trademarks and service marks.

Similarly, the World Intellectual Property Organization (WIPO) defines a trademark as a sign capable of distinguishing the goods or services of one enterprise from those of other enterprises. WIPO administers the Madrid Protocol, which allows trademark owners worldwide to file one application to register their trademark in multiple countries.

Approximate representation of Burberry check pattern. The pattern is a registered trademark of Burberry Ltd.

Almost anything that identifies the source of goods or services can serve as a trademark. In addition to words, slogans, designs, or combinations of these, trademarks can also include non-traditional marks like sounds, scents, or colours. Under the broad heading of trademarks, there are several specific types commonly encountered, such as trade dress, collective marks, and certification marks:

- Trade dress: the design and packaging of a product. For example, the distinctive decor of the Hard Rock Cafe restaurant chain is considered trade dress. The Lanham Act protects trade dress when it serves as a source identifier, similar to a trademark.
- Collective mark: A type of trademark used by members of a collective organisation to indicate that the goods or services originate from members who meet the organisation's admission standards. For instance, the collective mark BEST WESTERN is used by its members for hotel services.
- Certification mark: A type of trademark used by authorised individuals or businesses to indicate to consumers that specific goods or services, or their providers, meet the quality standards set by a certifying organisation. For example, the ENERGY STAR certification mark is used by authorised users to show that their products meet the energy efficiency standards established by the U.S. Environmental Protection Agency.

The ENERGY STAR certification mark is displayed on products, homes, buildings, and plants that have been verified as meeting the program's energy-efficiency standards.

To maintain distinctiveness, trademarks should function as adjectives, not as nouns or verbs, and be paired with a generic product or service name. They should also stand out from the surrounding text using capital letters, bold type, italics, colour, underlining, quotation marks, or a unique stylised format. For example, say "LEGO® toy blocks" instead of "Lego's."

=== Trademark symbols ===
A trademark may be designated by the following symbols:

- ™: For unregistered trademarks related to goods.
- ℠: For unregistered service marks connected to services.
- ®: Reserved for registered trademarks.

Registered trademark symbol

Trademark symbol

While ™ and ℠ apply to unregistered marks (™ for goods and ℠ for services), the ® symbol indicates official registration with the relevant national authority. Using the ® symbol for unregistered trademarks is misleading and can be treated as an unfair business practice. It may also result in civil or criminal penalties.

=== Brand vs. trademark ===
A brand is a marketing concept that reflects how consumers perceive a product or service. It has a much wider meaning and refers to the proprietary visual, emotional, rational, and cultural image that customers associate with a company or product.

A trademark, by contrast, offers legal protection for a brand with enforceable rights over the brand's identity and distinguishing elements.

== Fundamental concepts ==
=== Public policy ===
Trademark law is designed to fulfill the public policy objective of consumer protection, by preventing the public from being misled as to the origin or quality of a product or service. By identifying the commercial source of products and services, trademarks facilitate the identification of products and services which meet the expectations of consumers as to the quality and other characteristics.

Trademarks may also serve as an incentive for manufacturers, providers, or suppliers to consistently provide quality products or services to maintain their business reputation. Furthermore, if a trademark owner does not maintain quality control and adequate supervision about the manufacture and provision of products or services supplied by a licensee, such "naked licensing" will eventually adversely affect the owner's rights in the trademark. For US law see, ex. Eva's Bridal Ltd. v. Halanick Enterprises, Inc. 639 F.3d 788 (7th Cir. 2011). This proposition has, however, been watered down by the judgement of the House of Lords in the case of Scandecor Development AB v. Scandecor Marketing AB et al. [2001] UKHL 21; wherein it has been held that the mere fact that a bare licence (the equivalent of the United States concept of a naked licence) has been granted did not automatically mean that a trademark was liable to mislead.

By the same token, trademark holders must be cautious in the sale of their mark for similar reasons as apply to licensing. When assigning an interest in a trademark, if the associated product or service is not transferred with it, then this may be an "assignment-in-gross" and could lead to a loss of rights in the trademark. It is still possible to make significant changes to the underlying goods or services during a sale without jeopardising the trademark, but companies will often contract with the sellers to help transition the mark and goods or services to the new owners to ensure continuity of the trademark.

=== Comparison with patent and copyright ===
Trademarks are often confused with patents and copyrights. Although all three laws protect forms of intangible property, collectively known as intellectual property (IP), they each have different purposes and objectives:

Trademark, patent, or copyright
	Trademark	Patent	Copyright
Forms	A word, phrase, design, or a combination that identifies and distinguishes each party's goods or services from those of others and indicates their sources.	Technical inventions, such as chemical compositions like pharmaceutical drugs, mechanical processes like complex machinery, or machine designs that are new, unique, and usable in some type of industry.	Artistic, literary, or intellectually created works, such as novels, music, movies, software code, photographs, and paintings that are original and exist in a tangible medium, such as paper, canvas, film, or digital format.
Example	Coca-Cola® for soft drinks, Eat Bulaga!® for television shows	A new type of hybrid engine	Song lyrics to "Let It Go" from Frozen, Any segments on It's Showtime
Protects	Protects brands against unauthorised registration by other parties and helps prevent others from using similar trademarks with related goods or services.	Safeguards inventions and processes against duplication, manufacturing, usage, or sale by other parties without the inventor's consent.	Protects the exclusive right to reproduce, distribute, and perform or display the created work, and prevents other people from copying or exploiting the creation without the copyright holder's permission.

Among these types of IP, only trademark law offers the possibility of perpetual rights, provided the trademark is continuously used and renewed. However, if a trademark is no longer in use, its registration may be subject to cancellation. Trademarks can also lose protection through genericide, a process where a trademark becomes so widely used to refer to a category of goods or services that it loses its distinctiveness and legal protection. A well-known example is "escalator," which was once a trademark.

In contrast, patents have a fixed term, typically lasting 20 years from the filing date, after which the invention enters the public domain. Copyrights generally last for the life of the author plus an additional 50 to 70 years (depending on the jurisdiction), after which the protected work enters the public domain.

Although intellectual property laws such as these are theoretically distinct, more than one type may afford protection to the same article. For example, the particular design of a bottle may qualify for copyright protection as a non-utilitarian [sculpture], or trademark protection based on its shape, or the 'trade dress' appearance of the bottle as a whole may be protectable. Titles and character names from books or movies may also be protectable as trademarks while the works from which they are drawn may qualify for copyright protection as a whole. Trademark protection does not apply to utilitarian features of a product such as the plastic interlocking studs on Lego bricks.

== History ==
=== Early origins ===
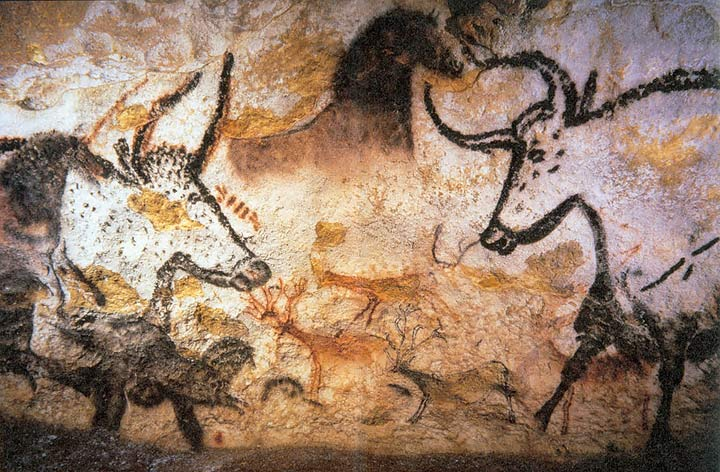
Prehistoric Lascaux cave paintings

The earliest examples of use of markings date back to around 15,000 years ago in prehistory. Similar to branding practices, the Lascaux cave paintings in France, for instance, depict bulls with marks, which experts believe may have served as personal marks to indicate livestock ownership.

Around 6,000 years ago, Egyptian masonry featured quarry marks and stonecutters' signs to identify the stone's origin and the workers responsible. Wine amphorae marked with seals were also found in the tomb of Pharaoh Tutankhamun, who ruled ancient Egypt more than 3,000 years ago.

Over 2,000 years ago, Chinese manufacturers sold goods marked with identifying symbols in the Mediterranean region. Trademarks have also been discovered on pottery, porcelain, and swords produced by merchants in ancient Greece and the Roman Empire.

Other notable trademarks that have been used for a long time include Stella Artois, which claims use of its mark since 1366, and Löwenbräu, which claims use of its lion mark since 1383.

=== National trademarks ===
The first trademark legislation was passed by the Parliament of England under the reign of King Henry III in 1266, which required all bakers to use a distinctive mark for the bread they sold.

The first modern trademark laws emerged in the late 19th century. In France, the first comprehensive trademark system in the world was passed into law in 1857 with the "Manufacture and Goods Mark Act". In Britain, the Merchandise Marks Act 1862 made it a criminal offence to imitate another's trade mark 'with intent to defraud or to enable another to defraud'. The passing of the Trade Marks Registration Act 1875 allowed formal registration of trademarks at the UK Patent Office for the first time. Registration was considered to comprise prima facie evidence of ownership of a trademark and registration of marks began on 1 January 1876. The 1875 Act defined a registrable trade mark as a device or mark, or name of an individual or firm printed in some particular and distinctive manner; or a written signature or copy of a written signature of an individual or firm; or a distinctive label or ticket'.

In the United States, Congress first attempted to establish a federal trademark regime in 1870. This statute purported to be an exercise of Congress' Copyright Clause powers. However, the Supreme Court struck down the 1870 statute in the Trade-Mark Cases later on in the decade. In 1881, Congress passed a new trademark act, this time according to its Commerce Clause powers. Congress revised the Trademark Act in 1905. The Lanham Act of 1946 updated the law and has served, with several amendments, as the primary federal law on trademarks.

The Trade Marks Act 1938 in the United Kingdom set up the first registration system based on the "intent-to-use" principle. The Act also established an application publishing procedure and expanded the rights of the trademark holder to include the barring of trademark use even in cases where confusion remained unlikely. This Act served as a model for similar legislation elsewhere.

=== Oldest registered trademarks ===
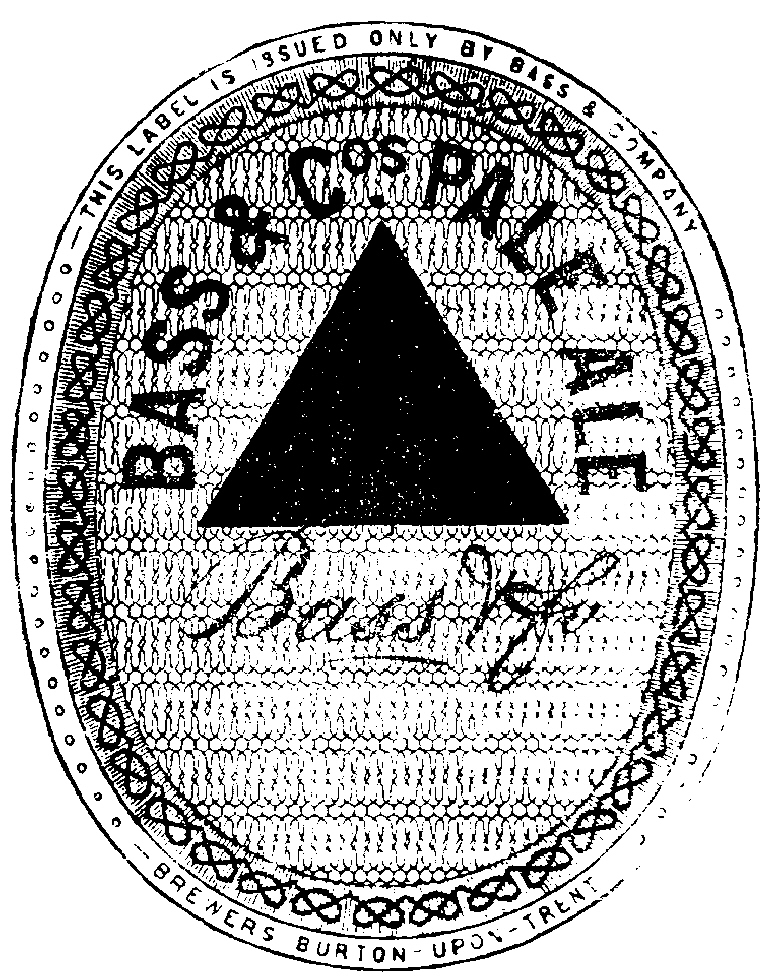
Bass Brewery's logo became the first image to be registered as a trademark in the UK, in 1876.

The oldest registered trademark has various claimants, enumerated below:

- Australia: Most significant companies were already using trademarks in the mid-nineteenth century and while Australia based its patent law on the British law system, the then province of South Australia (1863), and colonies Queensland and Tasmania (1864), New South Wales (1895) Victoria (1876) and Western Australia (in 1885) had enacted laws to protect trademarks well before Britain did. Thus the Bank of New South Wales had registered its coat of arms in c. 1850 and firms such as Tasmanian Jam and Preserved Fruit Co. had a trademark in 1878, when, after the Federation of Australia, the Commonwealth Trademarks Register was introduced on 2 July 1906 and the Trade Marks Office opened in Melbourne, on which date more than 750 applications were lodged. A product for treatment for coughs colds and bronchitis, PEPS, 'a wonderful breathing medicine in soluble tablet form', was the first of these federal trademarks, registered by Charles Edward Fulford; a rounded rectangle designed for the top of a tin. The shape contained the word 'PEPs' along with a descriptive blurb that read 'for coughs, colds & bronchitis.'
- United Kingdom: 1876 – The Bass Brewery's label incorporating its triangle logo for ale was the first trademark to be registered under the Trade Mark Registration Act 1875.
- United States: there are at least two claims:
  - A design mark with an eagle and a ribbon and the words "Economical, Beautiful, and Durable" was the first registered trademark, filed by the Averill Chemical Paint Company on 30 August 1870 under the Trademark Act of 1870. However, in the Trade-Mark Cases, 100 U.S. 82 (1879), the U.S. Supreme Court held the 1870 Act to be unconstitutional.
  - The oldest U.S. registered trademark still in use is trademark reg. no 11210, a depiction of the Biblical figure Samson wrestling a lion, registered in the United States on 27 May 1884 by the J.P. Tolman Company (now Samson Rope Technologies, Inc.), a rope-making company.
- Germany: 1875 – The Krupp steel company registered three seamless train wheel tires, which are put on top of each other, as its label in 1875, under the German Trade Mark Protection Law of 1874. The seamless train wheel tire did not break, unlike iron tires with seams, and was patented by Krupp in Prussia in 1853.

== Establishing rights ==
=== First-to-file and first-to-use ===
Trademark protection can be acquired through registration and/or, in certain countries, through use.

Globally, the most common method for establishing trademark rights is registration. Most countries operate under a "first-to-file" system, which grants rights to the first entity to register the mark. However, well-known trademarks are an exception, as they may receive protection even without registration.

In contrast, a few countries, like the United States, Canada, and Australia, follow a "first-to-use" or hybrid system, where using the mark in commerce can establish certain rights, even without registration. However, registration in these countries still provides stronger legal protection and enforcement.

The COCA-COLA® trademark has been registered with the U.S. Patent and Trademark Office since 1893.

For example, in the United States, trademark rights are established either (1) through first use of the mark in commerce, creating common law rights limited to the geographic areas of use, or (2) through federal registration with the U.S. Patent and Trademark Office (USPTO), with use in commerce required to maintain the registration. Federal registration with the USPTO provides additional benefits, such as:

- The registered trademark is added to the USPTO's database, which provides public notice to anyone searching for similar trademarks.
- Federal registration establishes a legal presumption of ownership and exclusive rights to use the mark. The registration certificate can serve as evidence of ownership in legal proceedings.
- A U.S. trademark registration can be a basis for filing for trademark protection in other countries.
- Registered trademarks can display the ® symbol to designate federal registration and discourage unauthorised use.
- Trademark owners can file infringement claims in federal court and may also record their registered trademarks with U.S. Customs and Border Protection (CBP) to help prevent the importation of counterfeit or trademark infringing goods.

=== Distinctiveness ===
Trademark law grants legal protection to "distinctive" trademarks, which are marks that allow consumers to easily associate them with specific products or services. A strong trademark is inherently distinctive (able to identify and distinguish a single source of goods or services), often falling into categories such as suggestive, fanciful, or arbitrary, and is therefore registerable. In contrast, weak trademarks tend to be either descriptive or generic and may not be registerable.

==== Acceptable trademarks ====
- Fanciful: Invented words that have meaning only in relation to their goods or services. For example, Exxon® for petroleum and Pepsi® for soft drinks.
- Arbitrary: Actual words that have no association with the underlying goods or services. For example, Apple® for computers.
- Suggestive: Words that suggest some quality of the goods or services, but do not state that quality of the goods or services outright. For example, Coppertone® for sun-tanning products.

==== Unacceptable trademarks ====
- Descriptive: Words that describe some aspect of the goods or services without identifying or distinguishing the source of those goods or services. Descriptive trademarks may become federally registerable if they acquire distinctiveness through long-term use in commerce.
- Generic: Common names for the goods or services and cannot function as trademarks because they fail to indicate a specific source. Generic trademarks are not federally registrable. For example, "Bicycle" for bicycles.

=== Clearance search ===
The registration process typically begins with a trademark clearance search to identify potential conflicts that could prevent the registration of the trademark. A comprehensive clearance search can help avoid costly and time-consuming issues, such as refusal to register, opposition or cancellation proceedings, or a trademark infringement lawsuit.

In the United States, the USPTO maintains a publicly accessible database of registered trademarks. This database can be searched using the Trademark Search system, which replaced the Trademark Electronic Search System (TESS) in 2023. A comprehensive clearance search involves checking the USPTO database for federally registered and applied-for trademarks, state trademark databases, and the internet to see if someone else has already registered that trademark or a similar one. The search should also include looking at both words and designs. To search for similar designs in the USPTO database, design search codes must be used.

In Canada, a NUANS search is necessary before registering a trademark, or corporate name.

For European Union trademarks, searches may be conducted online using the EUIPO's eSearch plus tool.

WIPO's Global Brand Database provides international access to trademarks and emblems.

=== National registration ===
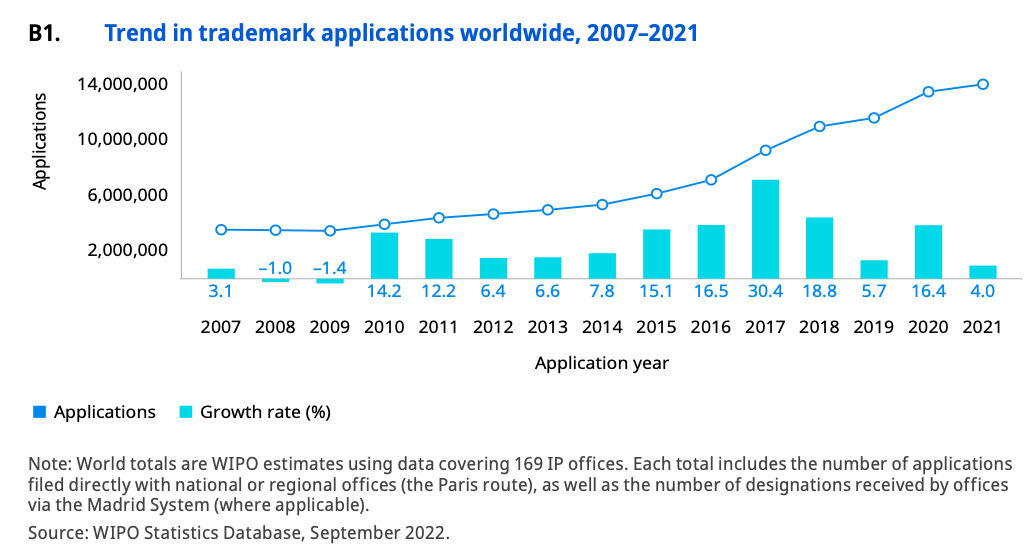
An estimated 13.9 million trademark applications were filed worldwide in 2021. This represents an increase of 4% compared to 2020. This was the twelfth consecutive year of growth following the end of the 2008 financial crisis.

Trademark owners can either maintain protection at the national level or expand internationally through the Madrid System by building on their national registration. To pursue international protection, a national registration or pending application is required to act as the "basic mark."

In the international application, the trademark owner can designate one or more Madrid System Member countries for protection. Each designated country's trademark office will review the Madrid application under its local laws to grant or refuse protection.

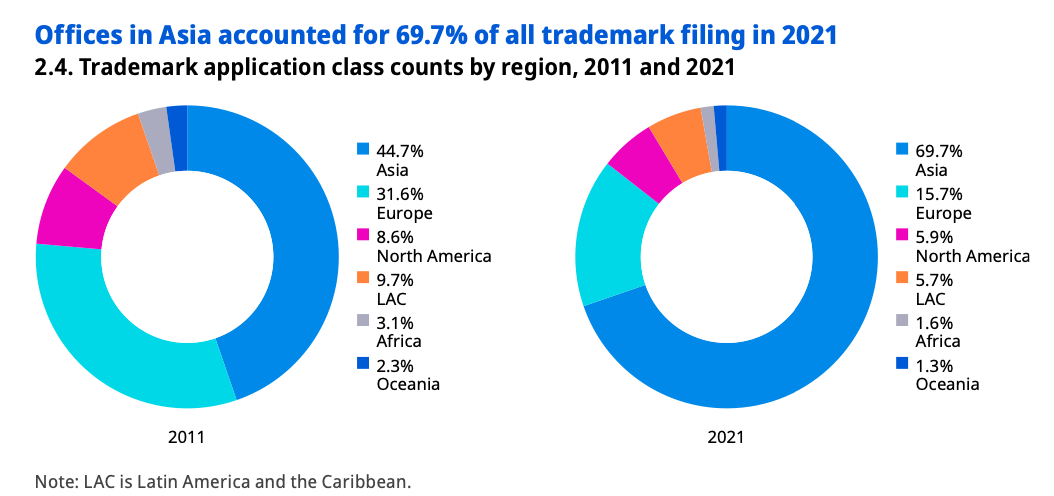
Offices in Asia accounted for 69.7% of all trademark filing in 2021.

In the United States, for example, a trademark must first be registered or pending with the U.S. Patent and Trademark Office (USPTO) to serve as the "basic mark" necessary for Madrid filings. The trademark registration process with the USPTO generally follows these steps:

1. Application: A trademark application is filed after completing a clearance search to identify any potentially conflicting marks.
2. Examination: An examining attorney reviews the application to ensure it meets legal requirements and that the trademark is registrable. The applicant may need to respond to any refusals or objections.
3. Publication: If approved, the trademark is published in the Trademark Official Gazette for a 30-day period, allowing the public to raise any objections.
4. Registration: If no opposition is filed, a registration certificate is issued, but ongoing maintenance is required to keep the registration active.

=== Madrid System ===
Trademark owners seeking protection in multiple jurisdictions have two options: the Paris route, under the Paris Convention, or the Madrid System, which is administered by WIPO.

The Paris route, covering 180 countries and also known as the "direct route," requires filing separate applications with each country's IP office. In contrast, the Madrid System streamlines the process by allowing a single Madrid application, built on an existing or applied-for national or regional registration (the "basic mark"), to extend protection to up to 131 countries.

Top Madrid applicants, 2024
Applicant	Origin	2024	2023	2022	2021
L'Oreal	France	244	199	170	189
Novartis	Germany	193	110	131	94
Euro Games Technology	Bulgaria	141	118	120	93
Shiseido	Japan	124	103	98	93
Boehringer Ingelheim International GmbH	Germany	106	110	54	60
Egis Gyógyszergyár Zrt.	Hungary	103	49	30	
Amorepacific Corporation	South Korea	96	31	47	
Huawei	China	86	78	80	106
O'Reilly Automotive Stores, Inc.	United States	77	1		
BYD Company Limited	China	73	13	21	

=== Maintaining registration ===
Unlike patents and copyrights, which have fixed expiration dates, trademark registrations typically have an initial term of 10 years and can be renewed indefinitely, as long as the mark remains in continuous use in commerce.

If the trademark owner stops using the mark for too long (typically three to five years, depending on the jurisdiction), the trademark rights may be lost. For example, in the United States, trademark rights are based on use in commerce. If a mark is not used for three consecutive years, it is presumed abandoned and becomes vulnerable to challenges. Similarly, the European Union requires "genuine use" of the mark within a continuous five-year period following registration to maintain the trademark, with non-use potentially resulting in revocation.

== Enforcing rights ==
The trademark owner must enforce their rights to preserve the trademark's distinctiveness, prevent trademark infringement, and avoid dilution. Enforcement after registration generally involves:

1. Border measures: Record registered trademarks with customs authorities, such as US CBP's e-Recordation or the EU's Application For Action, to help prevent the importation of counterfeit goods.
2. Monitoring: Track new trademark applications to identify potentially infringing marks.
3. Opposition proceeding: To prevent the registration of conflicting marks during the review period.
4. Cancellation proceeding: To revoke third-party trademark registrations that infringe or dilute a registered mark.
5. Cease-and-desist letters: Demand that infringers stop unauthorised use.
6. Litigation for infringement or dilution: Pursue lawsuits for injunctions and damages.

=== Trademark infringement ===
Trademark infringement occurs when a competitor uses the same or a confusingly similar trademark for the same or similar products in a jurisdiction where the trademark is protected. This concept is recognised in many jurisdictions, including the United States, the European Union, and other countries, though specific legal standards may vary. To establish trademark infringement in court, the plaintiff generally must show:

- Ownership of a valid mark.
- Priority of rights (plaintiff's mark is "senior" to the defendant's in registration or use).
- A likelihood of confusion regarding the source or sponsorship of the goods or services due to the similarity.

==== Limits and defences to claims of infringement ====
Trademark is subject to various defences, such as abandonment, limitations on geographic scope, and fair use. In the United States, the fair use defence protects many of the interests in free expression related to those protected by the First Amendment.

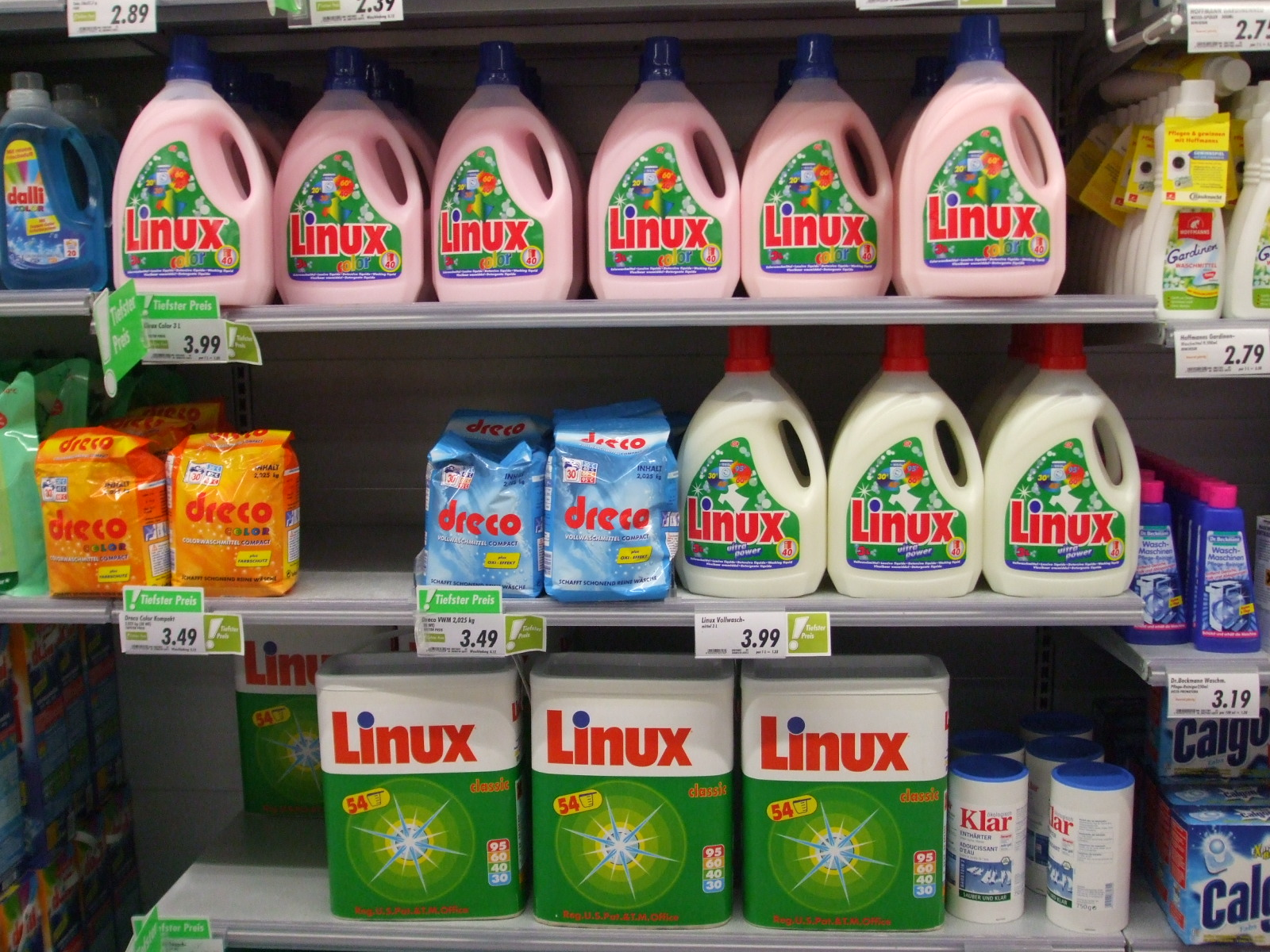
A product bearing "Linux" name, but not infringing the trademark owned by Linus Torvalds, because it falls into a different category

Fair use may be asserted on two grounds, either that the alleged infringer is using the mark to describe accurately an aspect of its products, or that the alleged infringer is using the mark to identify the mark owner. One of the most visible proofs that trademarks provide a limited right in the U.S. comes from the comparative advertising that is seen throughout U.S. media.

An example of the first type is that although Maytag owns the trademark "Whisper Quiet" for its dishwashers, makers of other products may describe their goods as being "whisper quiet" so long as these products do not fall under the same category of goods the trademark is protected under.

An example of the second type is that Audi can run advertisements saying that a trade publication has rated an Audi model higher than a BMW model since they are only using "BMW" to identify the competitor. In a related sense, an auto mechanic can truthfully advertise that he services Volkswagens, and a former Playboy Playmate of the Year can identify herself as such on her website.

==== Wrongful or groundless threats of infringement ====
Various jurisdictions have laws that are designed to prevent trademark owners from making wrongful threats of a trademark infringement action against other parties. These laws are intended to prevent large or powerful companies from intimidating or harassing smaller companies.

Where one party makes a threat to sue another for trademark infringement, but does not have a genuine basis or intention to carry out that threat, or does not carry out the threat at all within a certain period, the threat may itself become a basis for legal action. In this situation, the party receiving such a threat may seek from the Court a declaratory judgement; also known as a declaratory ruling.

=== Dilution ===
Dilution is a legal concept where the use of a mark similar to a famous one confuses or diminishes the public's perception of the famous mark. This occurs through "blurring" (weakening the association between the mark and its goods) or "tarnishment" (damaging the mark's reputation). For example, selling authorised Starbucks-branded auto parts might blur the association between Starbucks and coffee.

Dilution may only be applied in cases where a party's well-known mark is "famous". To be considered well-known, highly reputable, or famous, the mark must be widely recognised by the general public—essentially a "household name". Examples of marks likely considered famous marks in many countries around the world include Google, Coca-Cola, Sony, and Nike.

Many countries provide dilution protection in some form as a part of trademark law. Notable examples include the U.S. Trademark Dilution Revision Act (TDRA), Section 22 of the Canadian Trademarks Act (TMA), and Articles 4(4)(a), 5(1)(a), 5(2), and 5(5) of the European Union's Community Trade Mark Directive (TMD).

== Other aspects ==
=== Sale, transfer and licensing ===
In various jurisdictions, a trademark may be sold with or without the underlying goodwill which subsists in the business associated with the mark. However, this is not the case in the United States, where the courts have held that this would "be a fraud upon the public". In the U.S., trademark registration can therefore only be sold and assigned if accompanied by the sale of an underlying asset. Examples of assets whose sale would ordinarily support the assignment of a mark include the sale of the machinery used to produce the goods that bear the mark or the sale of the corporation (or subsidiary) that produces the trademarked goods.

=== Licensing ===
Licensing means the trademark owner (the licensor) grants a permit to a third party (the licensee) to commercially use the trademark legally. It is a contract between the two, containing the scope of content and policy. The essential provisions to a trademark licence identify the trademark owner and the licensee, in addition to the policy and the goods or services agreed to be licensed.

Most jurisdictions provide for the use of trademarks to be licensed to third parties. The licensor must monitor the quality of the goods being produced by the licensee to avoid the risk of the trademark being deemed abandoned by the courts. A trademark licence should therefore include appropriate provisions dealing with quality control, whereby the licensee provides warranties as to the quality and the licensor has rights to inspection and monitoring.

=== Domain names ===
The advent of the domain name system has led to attempts by trademark holders to enforce their rights over domain names that are similar or identical to their existing trademarks, particularly by seeking control over the domain names at issue. As with dilution protection, enforcing trademark rights over domain name owners involves protecting a trademark outside the obvious context of its consumer market, because domain names are global and not limited by goods or service.

This conflict is easily resolved when the domain name owner actually uses the domain to compete with the trademark owner. Cybersquatting, however, does not involve competition. Instead, an unlicensed user registers a domain name identical to a trademark and offers to sell the domain to the trademark owner. Typosquatters—those registering common misspellings of trademarks as domain names—have also been targeted successfully in trademark infringement suits. "Gripe sites", on the other hand, tend to be protected as free speech, and are therefore more difficult to attack as trademark infringement.

This clash of the new technology with preexisting trademark rights resulted in several high-profile decisions as the courts of many countries tried to coherently address the issue (and not always successfully) within the framework of existing trademark law. As the website itself was not the product being purchased, there was no actual consumer confusion, and so initial interest confusion was a concept applied instead. Initial interest confusion refers to customer confusion that creates an initial interest in a competitor's "product" (in the online context, another party's website). Even though initial interest confusion is dispelled by the time any actual sales occur, it allows a trademark infringer to capitalise on the goodwill associated with the original mark.

Several cases have wrestled with the concept of initial interest confusion. In Brookfield Communications, Inc. v. West Coast Entertainment Corp. the court found initial interest confusion could occur when a competitor's trademarked terms were used in the HTML metatags of a website, resulting in that site appearing in the search results when a user searches on the trademarked term. In Playboy v. Netscape, the court found initial interest confusion when users typed in Playboy's trademarks into a search engine, resulting in the display of search results alongside unlabelled banner ads, triggered by keywords that included Playboy's marks, that would take users to Playboy's competitors. Though users might ultimately realise upon clicking on the banner ads that they were not Playboy-affiliated, the court found that the competitor advertisers could have gained customers by appropriating Playboy's goodwill since users may be perfectly happy to browse the competitor's site instead of returning to the search results to find the Playboy sites.

In Lamparello v. Falwell, however, the court clarified that a finding of initial interest confusion is contingent on financial profit from said confusion, such that, if a domain name confusingly similar to a registered trademark is used for a non-trademark related website, the site owner will not be found to have infringed where they do not seek to capitalise on the mark's goodwill for their own commercial enterprises.

Also, courts have upheld the rights of trademark owners about the commercial use of domain names, even in cases where goods sold there legitimately bear the mark. In the landmark decision Creative Gifts, Inc. v. UFO, 235 F.3d 540 (10th Cor. 2000) (New Mexico), defendants had registered the domain name "Levitron.com" to sell goods bearing the trademark "Levitron" under an at-will licence from the trademark owner. The 10th Circuit affirmed the rights of the trademark owner about the said domain name, despite arguments of promissory estoppel.

Most courts particularly frowned on cybersquatting and found that it was itself a sufficiently commercial use (i.e., "trafficking" in trademarks) to reach into the area of trademark infringement. Most jurisdictions have since amended their trademark laws to address domain names specifically and to provide explicit remedies against cybersquatters.

In the US, the legal situation was clarified by the Anticybersquatting Consumer Protection Act, an amendment to the Lanham Act, which explicitly prohibited cybersquatting. It defines cybersquatting as "(occurring) when a person other than the trademark holder registers the domain name of a well-known trademark and then attempts to profit from this by either ransoming the domain name back to the trademark holder or using the domain name to divert business from the trademark holder to the domain name holder". The provision states that "[a] person shall be liable in a civil action by the owner of the mark ... if, without regard to the goods or services of the person, that person (i) had a bad faith intent to profit from the mark ...; and registers, traffics in, or uses domain name [that is confusingly similar to another's a mark or dilutes another's marked]".

This international legal change has also led to the creation of ICANN Uniform Domain-Name Dispute-Resolution Policy (UDRP) and other dispute policies for specific countries (such as Nominet UK's DRS) which attempt to streamline the process of resolving who should own a domain name (without dealing with other infringement issues such as damages). This is particularly desirable to trademark owners when the domain name registrant may be in another country or even anonymous.

Registrants of domain names also sometimes wish to register the domain names themselves (e.g., "XYZ.COM") as trademarks for perceived advantages, such as an extra bulwark against their domain being hijacked, and to avail themselves of such remedies as confusion or passing off against other domain holders with confusingly similar or intentionally misspelled domain names.

As with other trademarks, the domain name will not be subject to trademark registration unless the proposed mark is actually used to identify the registrant's goods or services to the public, rather than simply being the location on the Internet where the applicant's web site appears. Amazon is a prime example of a protected trademark for a domain name central to the public's identification of the company and its products.

Terms that are not protectable by themselves, such as a generic term or a merely descriptive term that has not acquired secondary meaning, may become registerable when a Top-Level Domain Name (e.g. dot-COM) is appended to it. An example of such a domain name ineligible for trademark or service mark protection as a generic term, but which currently has a registered U.S. service mark, is "HEARSAY.COM".

Among trademark practitioners there remains a great deal of debate around trademark protection under ICANN's proposed generic top-level domain name space expansion. World Trademark Review has been reporting on the at times fiery discussion between trademark owners and domainers.

== International law ==
Although there are systems that facilitate the filing, registration, or enforcement of trademark rights in more than one jurisdiction on a regional or global basis, it is currently not possible to file and obtain a single trademark registration that will automatically apply around the world. Like any national law, trademark laws apply only in their applicable country or jurisdiction, a quality which is sometimes known as "territoriality".

=== Territorial application ===
The inherent limitations of the territorial application of trademark laws have been mitigated by various intellectual property treaties, foremost among which is the World Trade Organisation Agreement on Trade-Related Aspects of Intellectual Property Rights (TRIPS). TRIPS establishes legal compatibility between member jurisdictions by requiring the harmonisation of applicable laws. For example, Article 15(1) of TRIPS defines "sign" which is used as or forms part of the definition of "trademark" in the trademark legislation of many jurisdictions around the world.

=== Madrid system ===
The major international system for facilitating the registration of trademarks in multiple jurisdictions is commonly known as the "Madrid system". Madrid provides a centrally administered system for securing trademark registrations in member jurisdictions by extending the protection of an "international registration" obtained through the World Intellectual Property Organisation. This international registration is in turn based upon an application or registration obtained by a trademark applicant in its home jurisdiction.

The primary advantage of the Madrid system is that it allows a trademark owner to obtain trademark protection in many jurisdictions by filing one application in one jurisdiction with one set of fees, and make any changes (e.g. changes of name or address), and renew registration across all applicable jurisdictions through a single administrative process. Furthermore, the "coverage" of the international registration may be extended to additional member jurisdictions at any time.

=== Trademark Law Treaty of 1994, and the Singapore Trademark Law Treaty of 2006 ===
The Trademark Law Treaty of 1994 established procedures for member countries to recognising trademarks registered in other member countries. It operates under the auspices of the World Intellectual Property Organisation. The treaty was established "with objectives to reduce the complexities in the multitude of registration procedures and to increase predictability of application outcomes" through "simplification and harmonization of certain features of these trademark registration procedures and formalities". According to the United States Patent and Trademark Office, the Trademark Law Treaty "simplifies and harmonizes trademark application and registration procedures by member states. It facilitates renewals, the recordation of assignments, name and address changes, and powers of attorney". By the 2000s, it became apparent that the terms of the treaty were outdated in light of the intervening development of the internet as a means of conveying information about products and businesses, leading to the enactment of the Singapore Treaty on the Law of Trademarks.

The Singapore Treaty on the Law of Trademarks further establishes a system under which member jurisdictions agree to standardise procedural aspects of the trademark registration process. It is not necessarily respective of rules within individual countries.

=== EU Trademark system ===
The EU Trade Mark (EUTM) system (formerly the Community Trademark system) is the trademark system which applies in the European Union, whereby registration of a trademark with the European Union Intellectual Property Office (EUIPO, formerly Office for Harmonisation in the Internal Market (Trade Marks and Designs)), leads to a registration which is effective throughout the EU as a whole. The EUTM system is therefore said to be unitary in character, in that a EUTM registration applies indivisibly across all European Union member states. However, the CTM system did not replace the national trademark registration systems; the CTM system and the national systems continue to operate in parallel to each other (see also European Union trade mark law).

Persons residing outside the EU must have a professional representative to the procedures before EUIPO, while representation is recommended for EU residents.

One of the tasks of a EUTM owner is the monitoring of the later applications whether any of those is similar to his/her earlier trademark. Monitoring is not easy and usually requires professional expertise. To conduct a monitoring there is the so-called Trademark Watching service where it can be checked if someone tries to get registered marks that are similar to the existing marks.

Oppositions should be filed on the standard opposition form in any official language of the European Union, however, the substantive part of the opposition (e.g. the argumentations) can be submitted only in the language of the opposed application, that is one of the working languages of the EUIPO, e.g. English, Spanish, German.

=== Well-known status ===
Well-known trademark status is commonly granted to famous international trade marks in less-developed legal jurisdictions.

Under Article 6 bis of the Paris Convention, countries are empowered to grant this status to marks that the relevant authority considers are "well known". In addition to the standard grounds for trademark infringement (same/similar mark applied same/similar goods or services, and a likelihood of confusion), if the mark is deemed well known it is an infringement to apply the same or a similar mark to dissimilar goods/services where there is confusion, including where it takes unfair advantage of the well-known mark or causing detriment to it.

A well-known trademark does not have to be registered in the jurisdiction to bring a trademark infringement action (equivalent to bringing a passing off claim without having to show goodwill and having a lesser burden of proof).

As per the Trademark Rules 2017, India, an applicant needs to substantiate his claim that his trademark is having the "well-known" status. He needs to furnish the documents in support of evidence of his rights & claims, namely use of trademark, any application for trademark, and annual sales turnover, and so on.

=== Protection of well-known marks ===
Many countries protect unregistered well-known marks following their international obligations under the Paris Convention for the Protection of Industrial Property and the Agreement on Trade-Related Aspects of Intellectual Property Rights (the TRIPS Agreement). Consequently, not only big companies but also SMEs may have a good chance of establishing enough goodwill with customers so that their marks may be recognised as well-known marks and acquire protection without registration. It is, nevertheless, advisable to seek registration, taking into account that many countries provide for extended protection of registered well-known marks against dilution (Art. 16.3 TRIPS), i.e., the reputation of the mark being weakened by the unauthorised use of that mark by others.

Several trademark laws merely implement obligations under Article 16.3 of the TRIPS Agreement and protect well-known registered trademarks only under the following conditions: 1- that the goods and services for which the other mark is used or is seeking protection are not identical with or similar to the goods for which the well-known mark acquired its reputation 2- that the use of the other mark would indicate a connection between these goods and the owner of the well-known mark, and 3 – that their interests are likely to be damaged by such use.

== See also ==
- Article 6ter
- List of generic and genericised trademarks
- UDRP (Uniform Domain-Name Dispute-Resolution Policy)
- Australian trade mark law
- Canadian trademark law
- Trademark law of China
- Trade mark law of the European Union
- Hong Kong trade mark law
- Indian trademark law
- Irish trade mark law
- Japanese trademark law
- Trademark law of Oman
- Philippine trademark law
- United Kingdom trade mark law
- United States trademark law
