= Domain name speculation =

Internet financial scheme

Domain name speculation, popular as domain investing, domain flipping or domaining in professional jargon, is the practice of identifying and registering or acquiring generic Internet domain names as an investment with the intent of selling them later for a profit.

The main targets of domain name speculation are generic words which can be valuable for type-in traffic and for the dominant position they would have in any field due to their descriptive nature. Hence generic words and phrases such as poker, insurance, travel, creditcards, loan and others are attractive targets of domain speculation in any top-level domain, the most popular of which is .com.

The speculative characteristics of domain names may be linked to news reports or current events. However, the effective period during which such opportunities exist may be limited. Quick turnaround in the resale of domains is often called domain flipping. Domain flipping may also involve the process of buying a valuable domain name and building a related website around it, all this with the objective of selling the domain and newly built website to an interested party.

== Concept ==
Sometimes, domain name speculation involves finding domain names early in a market, particularly when a new top-level domain is launched, registering them and waiting until the market grows to sell them. Domains such as voice.com, sex.com, and fund.com have sold for millions of US dollars.

The COM top-level domain (or 'TLD') is the focus of most domain speculation activity as it is the largest TLD. Domain speculation occurs in other TLDs as well, such as NET and to a lesser extent in ORG, INFO, and BIZ. Of the Generic top-level domains, INFO is the most popular by registration volume compared to BIZ gTLD due to the low cost of initial registration and the recognizability of INFO as being an abbreviation of information.

Domain name speculation also occurs in country code top-level domains (ccTLDs) such as .uk, .de and .us. The German TLD consists of over 12 million domains. The UK's domain has over 7.7 million domains registered according to Nominet's domain registration statistics webpage, mainly in its commercial sub-domain co.uk. These TLDs are mature markets where good domain names may command high prices. The EU ccTLD is an example of what happens when speculative activity overtakes "ordinary" domain registrations. A combination of an inept registry (EURid) and excessive speculation by businesses exploiting a poorly structured regulatory framework meant that, according to EURid's own statistics at the end of 2006, over 50% of the registrations could be considered at best speculative and at worst domain name warehousing.

Specialist and repurposed ccTLDs have also seen elements of domain name speculation. One example is the .tv ccTLD, whose registrations have been lucrative since TV is an abbreviation for the word television. The .mobi TLD is an example of a specialist TLD in that it is specifically targeted at mobile phones and similar mobile technology. The operators of .mobi, mTLD, have reserved some of the premium generic words which will be auctioned off. The intent is to create a more level playing field for those interested in developing websites. The .mobi premium generic words and phrases list is a good example of the domain names that are at the heart of most early-market domain name speculation.

Domain name speculators, sometimes known as domainers or domain investors, also register domain names based on seemingly generic phrases such as propertyforsale in the hope that these domain names could be sold later to businesses. Some (but not all) domain name investors will try to stay away from domain names containing trademarks as this could be considered cybersquatting.

Some country code TLDs or sponsored TLDs will have what is referred to as an eligibility or nexus requirement to limit registration to specific geographical or national regions. However this does not deter domain name speculation as various options such as using a local agent or company to enable people to register domains in such TLDs exist and have been used.

== Evolution ==
Domain name speculation has evolved with the expansion of the domain name system. Domain names were registered primarily for business purposes. In the 1990s, much of the ccTLD landscape had yet to appear, and the growing public awareness of the COM TLD was gathering momentum owing to the growth of the Dot-com bubble. This inevitably attracted the attention of those who saw potential value in domain names, and by this time many of the most valuable generic domain names, such as sex.com and business.com, had been registered. No clear legal position existed to distinguish domain name speculation and cybersquatting. Due to the open nature of most TLDs, anyone could register a domain name. This led to the development of the Uniform Domain-Name Dispute-Resolution Policy in 1999.

== Distinction from cybersquatting ==
A common accusation against domain name speculation is that it is cybersquatting. Cybersquatting is defined as registering, trafficking in, or using a domain name with bad faith intent to profit from the goodwill of a trademark belonging to someone else. The key element in this definition is that the intellectual property rights of another's trademark are infringed by the cybersquatter. For a UDRP action to succeed one of the things that the complainant has to establish is that the domain name is identical or confusingly similar to a trademark or service mark in which the complainant has rights. Legitimate domain name speculation tends to steer clear of trademarks and concentrate on generic words and phrases as domains based on trademarks can be subject of UDRP actions by the trademark owners. As the number of registered domain names has increased, the number of UDRP cases has also increased. Trademark and service mark owners now use brand protection services that monitor TLDs for newly registered domains that potentially infringe on their trademarks. This is due in part to typosquatting, a form of cybersquatting where variations of the spelling of a brand's domain will be registered in an attempt to profit from users mistyping the URL of the site they wish to visit.

Generic terms, such as the term "salt" when used in connection with sodium chloride, are not capable of serving the essential trademark function of distinguishing a product or service. This means that generic terms are generally not afforded any legal protection. The Canned Foods, Inc. v. Ult Search Inc. decision specifically deals with a case involving a generic term, "Grocery Outlet" and the domain name "groceryoutlet.com". The decision contains the key sentence "Generic terms receive no protection in US trademark law when they are used to label the goods and services that they describe."

Cybersquatting was first used as a legal term in March 1998 by a U.S. District Court in California in the case of Avery Dennison vs Sumpton. An early definition of the practice was given in Intermatic Inc. v. Toeppen, 947 F. Supp. 1227 (N.D. Ill. 1996). The definition was "These individuals attempt to profit from the Internet by reserving and later reselling or licensing domain names back to the companies that spent millions of dollars developing the goodwill of the trademark."

As domain name speculation has evolved alongside the domain name system, the most memorable and shortest domains tend to be amongst those registered first in any TLD. For old TLDs like COM (introduced in 1985), these domains will be long gone and people registering their first domains are often frustrated at the lack of short and memorable domains in this and other mature TLDs.

One of the main problems concerning trademarks and domain names in unrestricted TLDs and gTLDs is that of trademarks in general: the rights of the trademark owner have to be asserted in order to protect the trademark. The trademark owner has to take legal action, typically a UDRP, to defend the trademark after the potentially infringing domain has been registered. The UDRP action has to follow a procedure of notifying the respondent, receiving a reply from the respondent, appointing an adjudication panel and awaiting a decision. The process can take two months or more and all costs (typically more than $1,000 even for a single domain) are borne by the complainant, while the infringing party stands to lose nothing except the registration fee (usually under $10) for the original domain and the registrar of the infringing name incurs no penalty at all.

The global and unrestricted nature of TLDs and gTLDs effectively means that anyone in any country can register a domain name in them regardless of whether they have any intellectual property rights in that name. With country code TLDs the jurisdiction is more clearly defined. The affected intellectual property rights owner would have to take a legal action, typically a UDRP case to transfer or cancel the domain unless the registrant is in the same jurisdiction as the affected intellectual property rights owner. In this case, local law may be sufficient as the action may be considered as common law tort of passing off.

== Primary market speculation ==
The primary market for domain name speculation covers newly registered domain names that have not been registered before. Such domain names are often linked to news and current events. The launch of a new TLD encourages primary market speculation as domainers rush to register generic terms and also phrases that make a pun on the TLD name (domain hack). Other more organised domainers or domain name speculators register trademarks in advance of the launch of new TLDs specifically in order to register these short, memorable and potentially high value domains in the sunrise period of new gTLD launches. The Sunrise period is when intellectual property rights owners (trademark owners etc.) can register their trademark in the new gTLD in advance of the gTLD being opened for general registrations. In the last three years the main new TLDs launched were .eu ccTLD, .mobi TLD and .asia sTLD. All of these had landrush periods of varying success.

== Secondary market speculation ==
The secondary market for domain names covers previously registered domain names that have not been renewed by registrants or are available for resale. Sometimes these dropped domain names can be more valuable due to their having had high-profile websites associated with them. They will have links from other websites and could still have users searching for the websites because of these links. Others can be valuable because of the generic nature of the domain name or the length of the domain name, with two and three character names being the most sought after.

The business of registering the domain names as they are deleted by the registries is known as drop catching. It is a highly competitive business. The main operators in this business typically set up a number of front companies as registrars. VeriSign, in the case of TLDs COM and NET, allows each registrar a slice of the resources that may be used to register dropped domains. VeriSign drops domains in a random order, giving registrars only a vague idea of the particular drop time of a particular domain. Sometimes a group of drop registrars often work in confederation to increase their possibility of registering a dropped domain immediately after it is deleted by the registry. If the domain is caught by a confederation of registrars attempting to fulfill a domain backorder, then whichever domain registrar caught the domain will register it to the entity who backordered the domain. If the newly reregistered domain is captured by a company that has no customers who backordered it, the domain may be auctioned to the highest bidder by the registrar who captured it or an auction intermediary. The time between a drop and a capture is often measured in seconds or fractions thereof.

Some registrars do not allow domains to drop in the normal fashion, instead introducing an intermediary (e.g., Snapnames and Namejet) that auction the domain prior to their deletion. If nobody buys the domain at auction, it will pass through the normal deletion process.

== Domain name speculation and the rise of Pay per click websites ==
Cybersquatting has a clear legal definition, but this definition tends to be lost when people open a webpage with only pay per click ('PPC') advertising. It is often assumed that such a domain is "cybersquatted", especially when the person is searching for the domain in order to register it.

The ease with which PPC revenue could be derived from parked domains effectively created a situation where domains were being registered purely for their type-in traffic. Many of exact phrases that people were searching for in search engines were being registered for the sole purpose of serving PPC advertising. The COM TLD grew from 23,662,001 registered domains 1 January 2003 to 80,759,835 registered domains as of 1 January 2009. While part of that increase in the number of registered domain names is due to the increase in ecommerce and business conducted online, some of the increase is due to the ease of generating revenue from PPC and type-in traffic. Domain tasting, a practice by which millions of domains would be registered for a limited period (the five-day Add Grace Period during which a domain could be deleted without the registrar effectively having to pay a registration fee to ICANN) and only those generating sufficient revenue from PPC advertising would be retained, also served to increase the number of domains registered. This practice involved domain name registrars being created purely for the purpose of domain tasting. The situation became so bad in 2007 that ICANN was forced to take action. In June 2008 ICANN added a provision to its Fiscal Year 2009 budget to limit the number of domains that a registrar could delete using the Add Grace Period before having to pay the ICANN fee. The effect of this was to massively curtail the number of domains deleted in .com and .net during the Add Grace Period. From June 2008 to April 2009, AGP deletions fell by 99.7%.

The March 2006 Verisign Domain Brief stated that out of approximately 57.37 million COM and NET websites spidered, 26% were single page websites, 60% were multipage websites and 14% had no associated websites. Numerically, the number of single page websites was approximately 14.91 million. The single page websites include under-construction, brochure-ware and parked pages in addition to online advertising revenue generating (PPC) parked pages.

The latest statistics for domain name usage quoted in the Verisign Domain Brief for June 2009 states that of the 92 million COM and NET domain names, 24% of these domains have one page websites, 64% have multipage websites and 12% have no associated websites. In purely numerical terms, those single page websites would account for approximately 22 million COM and NET websites. The survey quoted in the Verisign Domain Brief does not explain the methodology or provide anything other than a summary of the results. However this is effectively a rise in single page websites of just over 7 million websites.

Some hosters such as Godaddy have their own domain parking systems and allow unused domains to be parked with the registrant receiving a share of the PPC revenue earned. Other hosters have similar systems.

== See also ==
- Domain Name System
- List of most expensive domain names
