= Internet in Belgium =

Internet in Belgium has a high level of adoption and engagement, with a 93% uptake rate among individuals as of 2022, higher than the EU average of 89%. The country is on par with the EU average regarding digital skills, with 54% of its population having at least basic digital competencies. Illustrated through initiatives like the BeCentral digital campus, Belgium has created programs to boost digital literacy, and has trained over 425,000 students since 2017 to narrow the digital skills gap.

In 2022, Belgium's fixed broadband adoption, providing speeds of at least 100 Mbps, was 67%, higher than the EU average of 55%. Mobile broadband in Belgium saw growth with the adoption rate reaching 90% in 2021, slightly above the EU average of 87%. Additionally, Belgium advanced in digital public services, exceeding the EU average in several key indicators.

Law enforcement in Belgium does take action against crimes committed on the Internet and filters websites hosting content that is illegal under Belgian law. Individual freedom of expression online is typically not violated by the government unless the expression could be classified as holocaust denial or incitement to hatred.

== Status ==
- Internet users: 11.15 million, 95.8% of the population, 27th in the world (2024).
- Fixed broadband: 5.19 million subscribers, 35th in the world, 44.2% of the population, 18th in the world (2024).
- Mobile broadband: 11.58 million subscribers, 70th in the world, 98.7% of the population, 89th in the world (2024).
- Internet hosts: 5.2 million, 21st in the world (2012).
- Top level domains: .be .brussels .gent .vlaanderen
- IPv4 addresses: 11.1 million, 0.3% of worldwide total, 1,068 addresses per person (2012).

== Broadband ==
=== Fixed broadband ===
According to the European Commission's Digital Decade Country Report 2023, Belgium's progress in fixed broadband infrastructure varies compared to the EU average. In 2022, fixed broadband uptake (at least 100 Mbps) in Belgium reached 67%, surpassing the EU average of 55%. The coverage of very high-capacity networks (VHCN) in Belgium stood at 78%, slightly higher than the EU average of 73%. However, fiber-to-the-premises (FTTP) coverage, which increased from 7% in 2020 to 17% in 2022, remains notably lower than the EU average of 56%.

=== Mobile broadband ===
In Belgium, advancements in mobile broadband infrastructure have been notable, characterized by a rise in adoption rates from 84% in 2018 to 90% in 2021, slightly surpassing the EU average of 87% in the same year. Despite progress, Belgium's 5G coverage expanded from 4% in 2020 to 30% in 2022, remaining notably below the EU average of 81%. However, Belgium's allocation of 5G spectrum reached 66% in 2023, aligning closely with the EU average of 68%.

== Digital public services ==
In 2022, Belgium made advancements in digital public services, exceeding the EU average in key metrics. Notably, 88% of citizens are utilizing e-government services, higher than the EU average of 74%. Additionally, Belgium's adoption rate of e-health records stands at 85%, which is above the EU average of 72%. In terms of specific scores, Belgium achieved 81 out of 100 for digital public services for citizens and 88 out of 100 for businesses, both higher than the respective EU averages of 77 and 84 out of 100. Investments totaling EUR 586 million have been allocated to digitizing public administration, including the justice system.

== Cable ==
Belgium also has cable networks. The biggest one, taken over by Telenet in 1997, covers almost all of Flanders. Speeds vary from 100 Mbit/s to 1 Gbit/s down.

As of June 2020, 93% of Telenet's nodes support Gigabit speeds. If Gigabit speeds are not available on a customer's node, the second fastest speed Telenet offers for residential plans, is 400 Mbit/s.

Even with Gigabit download speeds, upload speeds are limited to 'only' 40 Mbit/s for residential plans. It is believed Telenet will not increase their upload speed because DSL can not exceed 40 Mbit/s upload due to hardware restrictions Mbit/s upload due to hardware restrictions, until Proximus rolls out supervectoring. This means that for most households, 40 Mbit/s upload is the maximum they can get. Only providers using fiber and LTE networks offer faster uploads, but home internet over LTE is nowhere near as popular (yet), and FttH networks are still pretty new in Belgium and not widely available.

As of 2020, Telenet and VOO are the only owners of coaxial networks (originally built for transferring radio and TV signals). Other providers use their infrastructure as well.

Providers

- Scarlet (all of Belgium, low-cost brand of Proximus, website)
- Proximus (all of Belgium, website)
- Orange Belgium (all of Belgium, using both Telenet and VOO's network)
- Telenet. (Flanders (Dutch speaking part) and multilingual Brussels)
- VOO. (Wallonia (French speaking part) and multilingual Brussels)

== Bandwidth and transfer limits ==
Download speeds in Brussels are now reaching a good level, however, the majority of Belgians have bandwidth caps in place to limit the amount of data users can transfer through their connection. Typically these are between 5 GB/month and 1000 GB/month and show that the competition in this market has not been strong enough to drive out these practices which have vanished in other western and eastern European countries.

In June 2008 the Belgian Internet providers Dommel and Yabu ADSL announced nationwide ADSL subscriptions without the data limits.

In February 2010 the major operators of Belgium, including Telenet and Belgacom, announced tariffs with unlimited caps, but still with FUP formulas (fair usage policy). However, some of them have adapted the FUP so it only counts on specific hours of the day.

== IPv6 adoption ==
In 2014, Belgium has the world's highest adoption rate of IPv6 connectivity.

== Internet censorship ==
- Not individually classified by the OpenNet Initiative (ONI), but included in ONI's regional overview for Europe.
- Freedom House reports in its Freedom in the World 2013 report that freedom of speech and the press are guaranteed by the constitution and generally respected by the government and that Internet access is unrestricted.

There are no government restrictions on access to the Internet or credible reports that the government monitors e-mail or Internet chat rooms without appropriate legal authority. Individuals and groups engage in the expression of views via the Internet, including by e-mail. The Belgian constitution and law provide for freedom of speech, including for members of the press, and the government generally respects these rights in practice. An independent press, an effective judiciary, and a functioning democratic political system combine to ensure freedom of speech and press. The constitution and legal code prohibit arbitrary interference with privacy, family, home, or correspondence, and the government generally respects these prohibitions in practice.

Subject to warrants requested by the prosecutor all Belgian Internet providers have been filtering several websites at the DNS level since April 2009. This may be done when the websites are engaged in illegal activities or when they display information that is "contrary to public order or morality". People who browse the Internet using one of these providers and hit a blocked website are redirected to a page that claims that the content of the website is illegal under Belgian law and therefore blocked. In contrast to other countries, the Web sites were filtered not because of displaying pornographic content but in order to guarantee the privacy rights of suspects or criminals who committed sexual offenses against children and whose identity was accordingly revealed in the targeted Web sites.

Holocaust denial and incitement to hatred are criminal offenses punishable by a minimum of eight days (for Holocaust denial) and one month (incitement to hatred) up to one-year in prison and fines, plus a possible revocation of the right to vote or run for public office.

== Web browsers ==
As of 2024, most used web browsers according to Statcounter were:

Web browser	Market share	Reference
Chrome	54%	
Safari	26%	
Edge	8.8%	
Firefox	4.2%	
Samsung Internet	3.2%	
Opera	1.4%	
Android	0.31%	
Instabridge	0.15%	
Ecosia	0.12%	
other	0.36%	

As of 2024, most used web browsers according to Cloudflare were:

Web browser	Market share	Reference
Chrome	57%	
Safari	18%	
Edge	10%	
Firefox	5.9%	
Samsung Internet	4.3%	
Opera	1.2%	
Brave	1.0%	
DuckDuckGo Private Browser	0.21%	
Ecosia	0.10%	
Avast Secure Browser	0.09%	
Aloha Browser	0.07%	
Mi Browser	0.07%	

== See also ==
- Belgian National Internet eXchange (BNIX)
- Belnet, the Belgian national research network.
- DNS Belgium, manager of the .be top level domain.
