= Domain Developers Fund =

- Company type: Investment fund
- ISIN: ISIN: KYG280681076
- Industry: Investments
- Founded: 2008
- Founders: Michael Marcovici and small group of investors
- Defunct: 2015
- Fate: Unknown
- Headquarters: Cayman Islands
- Key people: Michael Marcovici, Alberto San (Directors)
- Products: Investments in domain names
- Website: www.domaindevelopersfund.com (archived)

Domain Developers Fund (DDF) was a public alternative investment fund that exclusively invested in Internet domain names.

DDF maintained an inventory of websites and domain names, including a wide variety of gTLD and ccTLD domains, from which it extracts advertising revenue through a combination of pay per click advertising, affiliate marketing and domain parking. Internet domains were perceived as an alternate asset class for investment diversification.

== History ==
DDF was started in the Cayman Islands in 2008 as a private investment vehicle for a small team of investors led by Michael Marcovici. The fund's founders pooled their separate domain investments into a single portfolio and, after it proved to be a profitable investment in 2009, allowed families and friends to invest.

In February 2010 the fund incorporated in the Cayman Islands and converted to an open-ended investment fund. The directors and managers of the Fund were Michael Marcovici and Alberto Sanz de Lama. The fund started accepting new investors on 1 August 2010.

By 2015, the fund appeared to be no longer operating after its web site had been taken down.

== Portfolio ==
DDF's domains were normally acquired at domain name auctions and drop auctions, a practice that bolsters portfolio liquidity and facilitates quick resale of domains. DDF used mass registrations at TLD launches and in emerging markets to expand its portfolio.

The geographical breakdown for DDF's portfolio by domains was 45% emerging markets such as India, Colombia, Ukraine, China, Nigeria, 40% developed markets in Europe and North America and 15% in cash. The funds management rarely releases information about sales or acquisitions.

In 2011 DNJournal released news about the Fund selling cars.net which became the 5th highest sale ever in the .net TLD. The portfolio's themes were law, medicine, retail, pharmaceuticals, banking, finance, insurance and food.

== Fees ==
DDF had issued Class A shares for individuals and Class B shares for institutions. Class A shares charged a 2.5% management fee and a 25% incentive fee. Class B shares charged a 2% management fee and a 20% incentive fees. The lockup period was six months, and the fund used up to 2x leverage.
