= Domain name auction =

Auctions for registering domain names

Domain name auction

A domain name auction facilitates the buying and selling of currently registered domain names, enabling individuals to purchase a previously registered domain that suits their needs from an owner wishing to sell. A Drop registrar offers sales of expiring domains; but with a domain auction there is no need to wait until (and if) a current owner allows the registration to lapse before purchasing the domain you most want to own. Domain auction sites allow users to search multiple domain names that are listed for sale by owner, and to place bids on the names they want to purchase. As in any auction, the highest bidder wins. The more desirable a domain name, the higher the winning bid, and auction sites often provide links to escrow agents to facilitate the safe transfer of funds and domain properties between the auctioning parties.

== Popularity ==
A number of factors have contributed to the rise in popularity of the domain name auction. The personalization of the web resulted in domain names being purchased by more private individuals and businesses than originally anticipated; and as a result there was also a rise in speculation and domain name warehousing. Anticipating a growing need for a targeted top-level domain name, domainers began to purchase names with an eye towards selling them at a later time. The advancing field of Search Engine Optimization (SEO) has also increased the desire to own a domain name that accurately reflects the subject matter of the web site.

Search Engine Optimization has put pressure on individuals and companies to consider how accurate domain names relate to their content. Therefore, they need to make sure their domain name closely relate to the content presented; allowing researchers to put the least possible energy and resources into quickly finding domain names with accurate information. Domain name auctions have become more popular when buyers and sellers are looking for specific domain names to achieve high Search Engine Optimization.

Another factor why more and more people are purchasing expired domains is solely for the traffic they generate. Search Engine Optimization experts use traffic generated to sell on to make a profit. They also claim having more visitors travelling from expired domains to a website can improve Search Engine Results Pages (SERPs) and Alexa rankings which both play an important role in Search Engine Marketing (SEM).

== Domain auction website ==
A domain auction website provides the technology through which users can list or purchase multiple domains easily and conveniently. Domain parking, once the most efficient method for advertising a domain for sale, allowed a domain owner to post the availability of the domain on a page, hoping someone who was interested in that name would surf through and see it listed for sale. With the development of the domain auction, multiple users can list multiple domains all in the same place, thereby exposing them to a greater number of potential buyers. Sites such as eBay and Sedo have made using auctions very commonplace, and domain auction sites also require little to no technical knowledge to use.

In the past, if a domain name was already registered by another party, it was generally advisable to choose a different name. Whether current owners list domains for auction for a specified period of time or provide an instant purchase option, the domain auction has become an important tool in uniting buyers and sellers in the quest for the most beneficial domain name.

== Cybersquatting ==
There are occasions when domain auctioning results from a practice known as "cybersquatting." According to the U.S. federal law known as the Anti-Cybersquatting Consumer Protection Act, cybersquatting is registering, trafficking in, or using a domain name with bad-faith intent to profit from the goodwill of a trademark belonging to someone else.

Many predatory buyers will even employ software to search for newly expired domains and register them out from under the original owner before s/he can renew it. This practice is often used to extort large amounts of money from legitimate domain name holders who rely on their domain names to remain in business.

== Evolution of Domain Names ==
=== Basic uses and purposes of Domain Names ===
In order for the exchange of information to be organized and searchable on the World Wide Web domain names are used. Domain names are substitutes for IP addresses, which are presented numerically, in order to further simplify the process of searching for information on the Internet. Domain name servers maintain the list that matches domain names to IP addresses. There are two types of domain names TLDs or Top Level Domains which include: .com, .edu, .gov, .net, .org, etc., and SLDs or secondary level domains, which precedes TLDs in the web address, and usually refers to the organization that has been registered to TLD by ICANN.

=== Domain Names become Lucrative ===
Domain names started to become a lucrative good when businesses began advertising themselves on websites other than the ones that they operated. These businesses paid fees to place their ads on other websites, and the ads were initially displayed on banners with links to the advertisers webpage embedded within them. The number of ‘click throughs’ for an ad on a particular webpage determined the rates a website could charge an advertiser. Monetizing web-spaces and links such as this soon gave way to auctioning off domain names.

=== Auctioning Domain Names ===
The final step that led to auctioning off domain names was Google's Pay per click (PPC) auction model which allowed bidders to buy search terms. This allowed webpage owners to sponsor a keyword so that their ad could appear each time a user searched the term on Google, and thus increased the likelihood of the ‘clickthroughs’ their sponsor ad obtained. Gradually, as advertisement placement and sponsoring or trademarking search terms on the World Wide Web became a viable source of profit, so did domain names that attracted attention from Internet users and advertisers. Additionally, new business models for monetizing domain names are emerging. In addition to the Pay per click (PPC) model, the Cost per action (CPA) or pay-per-action model is being used as a new strategy for online advertising.

== Recent Developments ==
The US government has officially renounced its control over the Internet's technical operations, including domain name systems, as of March 15, 2014. Responsibility has been handed over to the global multi-stakeholder community in hopes that the community transitions away from any US government oversight of the domain name system.

The transition away from US government control over Internet domain names officially began in 1997 when oversight of the system's technical operations were assigned to a nonprofit group, the Internet Corporation for Assigned Names and Numbers (ICANN), however, until now, the US government has remained a prominent force in regulating and monitoring these auctions.

According to the Senate Commerce Committee chairman, John Rockefeller, their recent decision to hand over all control to private entities is an effort to continue “transitioning movement of the Internet’s domain name system to an independent entity that reflects the broad diversity of the global internet community. It is consistent with other efforts the US and allied countries have instituted to promote open Internet to preserve and advance the current multi-stakeholder model of internet governance."
