= Pierre Verbaeten =

Belgian computer scientist

Petrus Verbaeten (born April 23), usually called Pierre, is a Belgian professor emeritus in the Computer Science Department at the KU Leuven, and has more than 226 publications to his name. He managed the internet domain field .be from 1989 to 2000.

== Biography ==
Verbaeten studied electronics at Katholieke Universiteit Leuven and graduated in 1969. The direction computer science was founded in 1971. His first contact with computer science was during his military service. He then followed Applied Mathematics, in which a few computer science fields occurred.

== Functions ==
- Former chairman of the Department of Computer Science at the Katholieke Universiteit Leuven
- Chairman of the Board of Directors EURid of 2004
- Member in the DistriNet research group at KU Leuven
- Administrator of the top-level domain .be between 1989 and 2000
- Member DNS.be of 2000
- Professor at KU Leuven since 1982
