= Type in =

Type in may refer to

- Type-In, a meeting of typewriter enthusiasts
- Type-in program
- Type-in traffic
