= Direct navigation =

Direct navigation describes the method individuals use to navigate the World Wide Web in order to arrive at specific websites. Direct navigation is a 10-year-old term which is generally understood to include type-in traffic.

== Definition ==
Direct navigation traffic was first discovered circa 1996. The few domainers who had premium names and analyzed their traffic found people were typing in their domain names and bypassing search engines. Many of them immediately realized the potential of these domain names.

Domainers describe direct navigation as an Internet user navigating to a website directly through the browser address bar. They bypass online search engines by typing a name like "hotels" and adding ".com". For that reason, direct navigation traffic is more valuable than search engine traffic since it is better targeted. Short words that describe large segments of a market are the most valuable direct navigation names. Domainers call these names premium names and they have sold in the millions of dollars year after year since 1997.

Marketers also include bookmarked traffic in the direct navigation group. Domainers do not consider bookmarked traffic as direct navigation since in most cases they do not involve a direct navigation premium domain name. A bookmark is made when an internet user actively adds a URL to their list of bookmarked pages. This is very different from using the browser address line to navigate to a premium domain name like hotels.com. Hence the inclusion of bookmarked traffic is not included in the domainer's version of the direct navigation market.

A 2005 study of Internet traffic by WebSideStory's StatMarket division revealed that direct navigation traffic such as browser type-in traffic, bookmarks of existing sites, and visits to existing, known website domain names converts into sales for advertisers at 4.23% of total visits compared to 2.3% for product and service related searches performed via the search box at search engines such as Google and Yahoo.

In September 2008, a startup called ubexact.com branded itself as a direct navigation search engine. It claimed to allow searching through the address bar by appending arbitrary topics to its URL, e.g. ubexactscienceandtechnology.com. It combined aspects of a search engine and a web directory. Critics considered ubexact.com's index incomplete compared to existing search engines. The startup went out of business by January 2009, with its CEO blaming the failure on "timid marketing agency practices".

== Research ==
Direct Navigation has a relationship with site indexes. In a 2012 study by Tao Yang et al., working in combination with site indexes created a bookmark for looking in an index instead of “going back to the (index) list”. Direct Navigation and Indexes facilitate better outcomes for discovering favorable information.

Another input area found to benefit from direct navigation is selective exposure. Selective exposure relates to the type of internet content users seek to engage with that aligns with their beliefs or attitudes while avoiding what does not. A 2019 study by Carden, A.S., et al. found that “direct navigation increases selective exposure by about 3 percent compared to Google and Facebook”.

Another 2022 research article by Wojcieszak, M., et al. explored which search method would yield better results in users engaging in differing types of news content. They compared how its users accessed news and how they were exposed to diverse news content. Amongst those compared direct navigation was more effective by 50 percent.

Direct Navigation remains integral to web searching. Direct Navigation continues to supersede all other avenues of accessing content. A 2014 study by Budak, C., et al. states “The majority of retail sessions are not initiated by advertising but rather by Direct Navigation (35%) and organic web search (29%) both of which are initiated independently by the user”. The research aimed to determine the need for advertising and tracking consumers' internet use. This study demonstrates the suitable method of accessing content is through direct navigation. This further validates this method of navigating the web and its efficiency.
