= Human rights in Belgium =

According to international observers, human rights in Belgium are generally respected and the law and the judiciary provides effective means of addressing individual instances of abuse. However, some concerns have been reported by international human rights officials over the treatment of asylum seekers, prison overcrowding and the banning of full face veils. Capital punishment is fully abolished and a prohibition on the death penalty is included in the Constitution of Belgium. Belgium is a founding member of the European Union and the Council of Europe and a signatory to the European Convention on Human Rights. Belgium has minimal issues regarding corruption and was ranked 15 out of 167 countries surveyed in Transparency International's 2015 Corruption Perceptions Index.

== Basic freedoms ==
Belgium's constitution guarantees freedom of speech and of the press, although it is illegal to deny the Holocaust. Belgians have free access to the Internet, academic freedom, freedom of assembly, freedom of movement within the country, freedom to travel abroad, freedom to move abroad and to move back to the country.

There is a concern that the French-speaking media, and in particular the French-language public broadcaster Radio Télévision Belge Francophone (RTBF), exercise censorship against non-traditional political parties, that is other than the four leading French-speaking parties: Écologiste (ECOLO), Mouvement Réformateur (MR), Socialist Party (PS), and Humanist Democratic Centre (CDH). Extreme right and extreme left parties receive little or no representation in the media or broadcast time.

A 2008 United Nations report noted that Belgium had not yet ratified the International Convention on the Protection of the Rights of All Migrant Workers and Members of Their Families.

== Right to vote ==
Eighteen is the age when the right to vote is attained. Male Universal suffrage was enacted in 1893. Belgium was the first country in the world to introduce compulsory voting, in 1892 for men and 1949 for women. Eligible voters who fail to cast a ballot "face a moderate fine or, if they fail to vote in at least four elections, they can lose the right to vote for 10 years."

The European Court of Human Rights, in the 1971 case of X v Austria, ruled that "mandatory voting does not violate fundamental freedoms, because only attendance at a polling station – and not voting itself – is compulsory, while the voters also have the option of casting a blank or spoiled ballot paper."

== Freedom of religion ==
Freedom of religion in Belgium is protected by law and the constitution. However, religious tension and discrimination has, on occasion, remained an issue within society. In its 2008 annual report, the Center for Equal Opportunity and the Combat against Racism (CEOCR) warned against growing societal violence, harassment, and discrimination against Muslims. Of the 105 religious discrimination incidents reported by the public to the center, 94 concerned discrimination against Muslims. Of the 430 Internet hate incidents that were reported 80 percent were against Muslims. During the year there were reports of a number of anti-Semitic acts, including attacks against persons, verbal harassment of Jews, and vandalism of Jewish property. The law prohibits public statements that incite national, racial, or religious hatred, including denial of the Holocaust.

In April 2010, the Chamber of Representatives (the lower house) voted to ban the wearing of full face veils such as the niqāb or burqa. Human Rights groups condemned this move as a potential violation of the rights to freedom of expression and freedom of religion of those women who wear the burqa or the niqab as an expression of their identity or beliefs.

== Treatment of prisoners and asylum seekers ==
While generally meeting international standards, numerous international organisations have noted that Belgian Prisons continue to suffer from overcrowding and in June 2008 the human rights commissioner of the Council of Europe (CE) issued a report noting that 75 percent of all prisons in the country were overcrowded.

Belgium is a party to the 1951 Convention relating to the Status of Refugees and its 1967 Protocol. Its laws provide for the granting of asylum or refugee status, and the government has established a system for providing protection to refugees. While the government generally provided protection against the expulsion or return of refugees to countries where their lives or freedom would be threatened on account of their race, religion, nationality, membership in a particular social group, or political opinion; the UN Committee on the Elimination of Racial Discrimination (CERD) severely criticized conditions in detention centres for migrants and asylum-seekers.

On August 16, 2020, International Prisons Observatory branch in Brussels condemned the new rule passed by prisons authority to the Brussels bar, which violates human rights of prisoners and in particular their right to a fair trial.

== Women's rights ==
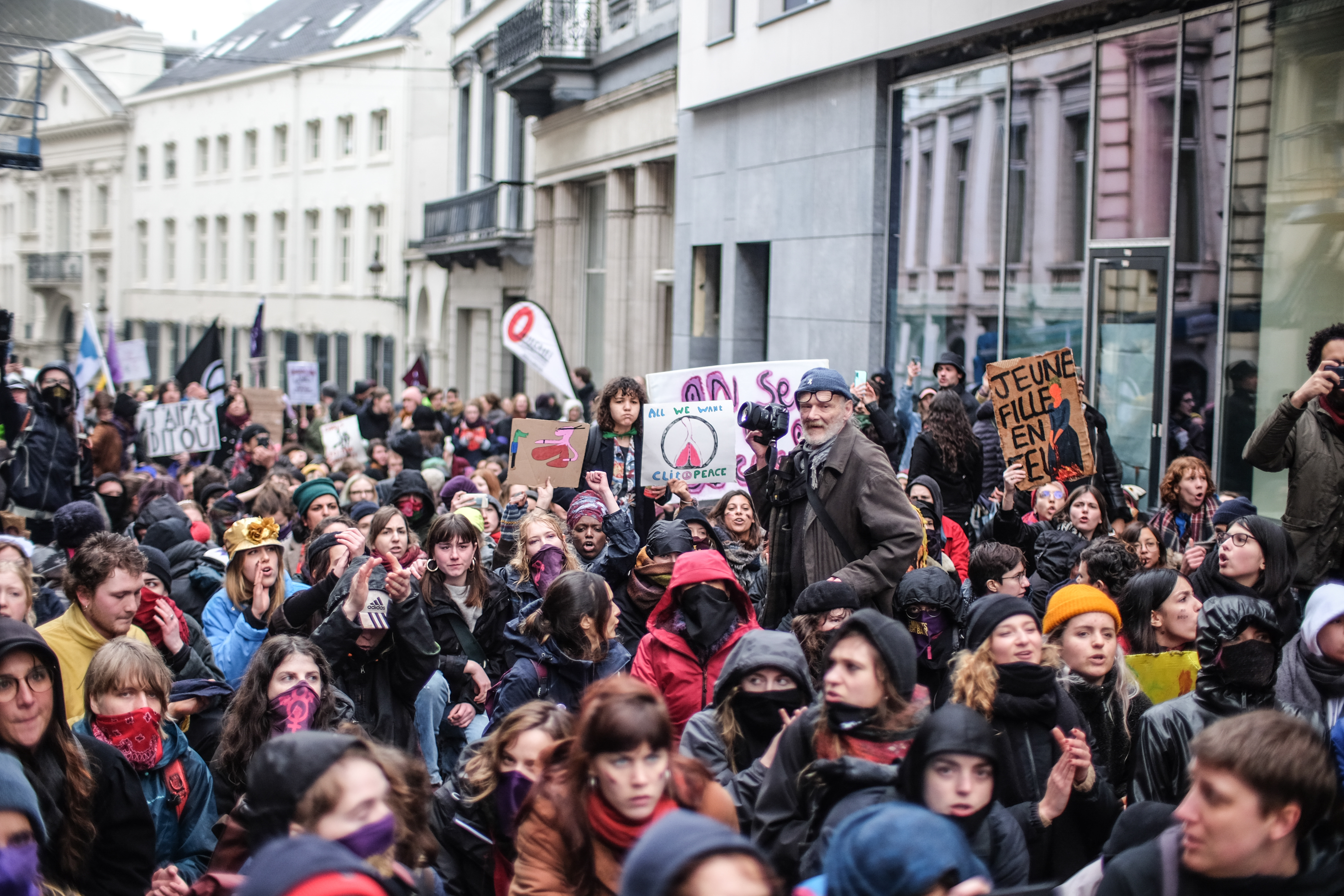
International Women's Day march in Brussels, 8 March 2020

The age of consent is 16 and sentences for rape in Belgium can range from 10 to 30 years. Police can enter a home without the head of household's consent when investigating a domestic violence complaint and there are government-supported shelters and telephone help lines for victims of spousal abuse. The government's Institute for the Equality of Men and Women exists for the purpose of promoting gender equality and is empowered to bring lawsuits.

A 2008 report by the UN's Committee on Discrimination against Women called on Belgium to ensure that women receive equal pay and equal access to jobs. It further recommended that Belgium “take the steps necessary to increase the percentage of women occupying leadership positions in all sectors of the society and to make regular assessments of the effectiveness of those steps.” The report asked for new legislation that would allow women to pass on their last names to their children and also requested that sexual abuse, which under Belgian law is considered a moral offense, be reclassified as a crime of violence.

Since 2008, Belgian parents are allowed to choose their children's last names. The name should be maternal, paternal or a combination of the two.

=== Migrant women ===
In Belgium, almost 15 percent of women experience some form of partner violence. Migrant women are particularly vulnerable, as they are unable to report their partners for fear of being deported. There have been reports of honor-related violence, forced marriages, and female genital mutilation.

In 2006 and 2007, the Belgian government sought to address this problem by introducing important clauses in the Law of 15 December 1980 relating to the access to the territory, residence, establishment and removal of foreigners (the “Aliens Act”). These legal changes allow migrants to retain residency rights if they come forward and report family violence.

== Minority rights ==
According to a 2009 survey, “skin color and dress associated with Islam” are the major factors in discrimination in Belgium, “especially in the areas of housing and employment.” A 2009 CEOCR report said that of all immigrants, Muslims were the victims of the greatest discrimination. An International Helsinki Association report issued in 2007 complained about the “use of racist and xenophobic arguments in political discourse” in Belgium, noting that in April 2006, “the leader of the Front National Party and member of the Brussels Regional Parliament Daniel Féret, was sentenced to 250 hours of community service because of incitement to racial hatred. He was also barred from running for political office for ten years.” The International Federation of Human Rights Leagues filed a complaint in 2010 before the Council of Europe Social Rights Committee, charging Belgium with mistreating Roma and “travelers,” in part by failing to provide them with adequate housing.

== LGBT+ rights ==
Same-sex sexual activity has been legal in Belgium since 1795, when Belgium was a French possession. In 2003, Belgium became the second country in the world to legalize same-sex marriage.

Laws forbidding discrimination against gays in employment, housing, and other areas went into effect in the same year. A law passed in 2004 allows any same-sex couple to marry in Belgium if one of the spouses has lived in Belgium for at least three months. Same-sex couples won equal adoption rights in 2006. Hiring surrogate mothers is illegal (for both same-sex as opposite-sex couples). Gay men are allowed to donate blood.

Belgium's former prime minister, Elio Di Rupo, is openly gay. Belgium was the second country in the world, after Iceland, to have an openly gay head of government.

== Employees' rights ==
Belgian law guarantees workers the right to unionize and bargain collectively, and all workers except those in the military have the right to strike. Although compulsory labor is illegal, individuals from Eastern Europe, sub-Saharan Africa, and Asia are trafficked to Belgium for prostitution and other kinds of forced labor. A United Nations human-rights report that was issued in 2010 proposed that Belgium provide more assistance to victims of human trafficking and that it change its laws to ensure that residency permits are issued to such persons whether or not they choose to cooperate with court authorities.

Children under 15 are not permitted to work in Belgium; those between 15 and 18 are allowed to do part-time work and to work full-time during school vacations; waivers can be granted for children working in, for example, entertainment. In larger cities some children are exploited by organized gangs of beggars.

There is a minimum wage; the work day is eight hours, and the work week is 38 hours. These and other rules regulating work hours, safety, and other issues are enforced by the Employment and Labor Relations Federal Public Service.

== Arrest, trial, and punishment ==
Persons may be arrested only in the act of committing a crime or on orders issued by a judge within the previous 24 hours and defendants have the right to be informed promptly of charges against them. In response to complaints about police conduct at demonstrations held from September 29 to October 1, 2010, a United Nations report issued that year called on Belgium to ensure that police, when using force, follow the United Nations Principles on the Use of Force and Firearms by Law Enforcement Officials and that arrests are carried out in legitimate fashion.

Defendants have the right to a fair trial, to a presumption of innocence, to counsel (at public expense if they cannot afford it), and to appeal. A Council of Europe report issued in 2005 expressed concern about “the lack of fundamental safeguards” in Belgium “against ill-treatment in police custody.” It was recommended that Belgium adopt legislation to improve the situation, “especially to ensure the detainees’ right of access to a lawyer.” The Council of Europe has also complained about the “excessive length” of certain judicial proceedings in Belgium. In 2009 the ECHR “found five violations of the right to a fair trial, two violations for the length of proceedings, one violation of the right to liberty and safety, one violation for the absence of effective inquiry and one violation for inhuman and degrading treatment as provided under the European Convention on Human Rights.” In June 2008 the human rights commissioner of the Council of Europe (CE) issued a report noting that 75 percent of all prisons in the country were overcrowded. A United Nations human-rights report issued in 2010 called on Belgium to “improve prison conditions and, in particular, to address overcrowding.” There is also violence among prisoners, and some prisons are rundown. There is a federal mediator who acts as an ombudsman in regard to prison conditions. Inmates have the right to correspond, to have phone conversations, to receive visitors, and to practice their religion. Monitoring visits by human-rights groups are permitted. The Council of Europe's Council for the Prevention of Torture (CPT) has cited allegations of mistreatment of prisoners by guards at the Ittre Prison; in 2009 an inmate at the Jamioulx Prison allegedly was killed by three guards.

== See also ==
- Internet censorship in Belgium
