= Aftermarket =

Aftermarket may refer to:

- Aftermarket (merchandise), any market where customers who buy one product or service are likely to buy a related, follow-on product
- Automotive aftermarket, the addition of non-factory parts, accessories and upgrades to a motor vehicle also to include removal of parts after vehicle is placed on market
- Aftermarket (finance), or secondary market in financial parlance, the trading of securities that have already been issued
- Domain aftermarket, a secondary resale market for Internet domain names
- The market for parts that are no longer made, see new old stock
