= Federal prosecutor's office (Belgium) =

The federal prosecutor's office (Dutch: federaal parket, French: parquet fédéral, German: föderale Staatsanwaltschaft) of Belgium is a prosecutor's office with jurisdiction over the entire Belgian territory, unlike the other prosecutor's offices which are associated to a particular court or arrondissement ("judicial district"). The office was created in 2002 to be able to act more efficiently against certain forms of crime that transcend the borders of individual judicial districts, such as human trafficking or terrorism. In this capacity, the office has the power to carry out prosecutions in all Belgian courts with criminal jurisdiction. The office fulfills its duties under the authority of the Minister of Justice, and is bound by the prosecutorial guidelines of the College of prosecutors-general.

The federal prosecutor's office is located in Brussels. The office consists of around thirty federal magistrates ("assistant prosecutors") and is led by the federal prosecutor. As of 2020, the incumbent federal prosecutor is Frédéric Van Leeuw. The federal magistrates and federal prosecutor are not permanent members of the office; they are members of the other Belgian prosecutor's offices who are appointed for a five-year federal mandate.

== Duties ==
The federal prosecutor's office has four main duties:

- To initiate criminal investigations and prosecute cases that belong to its jurisdiction, in conjunction with the other prosecutor's offices. These are cases that exceed the jurisdiction of the other prosecutor's offices or that meet certain criteria, such as cases involving human trafficking, terrorism, crimes related to nuclear material or transnational organized crime. In some cases, the federal prosecutor's office has the exclusive power of prosecution, such as in cases involving crimes against humanity or piracy.
- To ensure the coordination of investigations or prosecutions by the other prosecutor's offices, by providing support or by centralising multiple concurrent investigations at one office.
- To facilitate international judicial cooperation, by providing support with regards to mutual legal assistance, and by acting as a central contact point for foreign and international judicial authorities (such as Eurojust).
- To supervise the functioning of the Federal Police.
