= IDNX =

IDNX may stand for:

- Integrated Digital Network eXchange, a data format and communications protocol
- Internet Domain Name Index, a price index for internet domains
