= Domain name warehousing =

Registrars controlling expired domain names

Domain name warehousing is the practice of registrars obtaining control of expired domain names already under their management, with the intent to hold or "warehouse" names for their own use and/or profit.

Typically this practice occurs after a domain name has expired and the previous registrant has not exercised their right to renew the name within the allotted time frame – usually 45 days following expiration. A domain's expiration date and time can be calculated based on the expiration date in the WHOIS, Auto-Renew Grace Period (0–45 days) and the Redemption Grace Period (RDP) of the registry managing the domain registration (30 days).

== Background ==
According to the Generic Names Supporting Organization Council (GNSO) Deletes Task Force Report (2003), a council organized under the Internet Corporation For Assigned Names and Numbers (ICANN), three specific modes of warehousing have been identified:

1. The registrant allows the domain name to lapse, but registrar fails to delete the domain name during the grace period, resulting in a paid renewal to the registry. The registrar subsequently assumes registration of the domain name.
2. The registrant purchases the domain name through fraud and the registrar assumes registration of the name to resell in order to minimize losses.
3. The registrar registers the domain in its own name outright.

== Controversy ==
The Registrars Accreditation Agreement (RAA) currently does not disallow this practice. However, the ICANN community has open calls for policy changes to limit warehousing, as it is perceived as unfair to potential registrants.

A concern with the practice of domain warehousing is that retail registrars, which have focused on serving individual and small business registrants, are actively collecting lapsed domain names and offering drop catch services that conflict with the concept of fair access to domain names. Another concern is that companies pooling scores of drop registrars for additional registry connections will stand at the expiring domain spigot conducting domain tasting without paying and warehouse those that meet traffic criteria while denying the broader community a fair opportunity to compete for those expiring names.

From 2005 to 2008, GoDaddy had a subsidiary, Standard Tactics, which held domains previously owned by GoDaddy. Shortly after this was reported on, GoDaddy closed down Standard Tactics. However, today, GoDaddy openly practices domain warehousing. Instead of letting domains which GoDaddy considers "Premium domains" expire, GoDaddy takes control of and lists as "Premium Domains" those domains, after the registrant – GoDaddy's customer – allows them to lapse, even before the end of the redemption period. These domains are often listed at GoDaddy auctions for thousands of dollars, as "Premium domains". GoDaddy sells these domains at auction while the original registrant is still entitled to redemption of the domain, with the stipulation that if the original registrant uses their right to redeem the domain and renews it within the redemption period, GoDaddy simply refunds the money paid by the winning bidder.

ICANN has not yet amended the RAA with policies to limit domain warehousing and related practices. Registrars are in a unique position to impact domain name pricing by introducing competitive bidding or auctions for expired domain names. Fair access to domain names is further impacted when registrars opt not to market the warehoused domains immediately, delaying the recycling of warehoused names indefinitely.

== See also ==
- Domain name front running
- Domain drop catching or domain sniping
- Domain tasting
