= Domain aftermarket =

Resale market for Internet domain names

The domain aftermarket is the secondary resale market for Internet domain names in which a party interested in acquiring a domain that is already registered bids or negotiates a price to effect the transfer of registration from the registered holder of that domain name.

The professional pursuit of speculation in the domain aftermarket is known as domaining. The domain aftermarket has grown substantially, as an increasing number of generic domains names that promise 'marketing appeal' and 'desirability' are registered by domain warehouses, or resellers.

Transactions are facilitated by aftermarket platforms such as Afternic and Sedo. They provide communication methods for buyers and sellers to interact, often anonymously, to negotiate and close a transaction. They often provide additional services, such as financial escrow services and domain parking.

According to NameBio, 144,700 domain name sales totaling US$185 million were recorded in 2024. While the number of sales declined, the total dollar volume rose by 32.8% compared to 2023. Sales of .com domains accounted for 74.4% of the year’s total dollar volume. Country code extensions saw a 44.4% year-over-year increase, driven by .ai domains, where dollar volume more than doubled, rising 107%.

A more recent development is the use of the Domain Name System (DNS) to signal that a registered domain name is available for sale. In July 2026, the Internet Engineering Task Force (IETF) published RFC 10023, which defines the `_for-sale` DNS node name as an operational convention for indicating that a domain name is available for purchase. The convention allows domain name holders to publish this information directly in DNS, allowing registrars, marketplaces, search engines and other domain-related tools to discover domains that are explicitly offered for sale. RFC 10023 is an Informational RFC and does not introduce a new DNS protocol.

== See also ==
- Domain Name System
- Domain name speculation
