= Time switch =

Timer-controlled electric switch

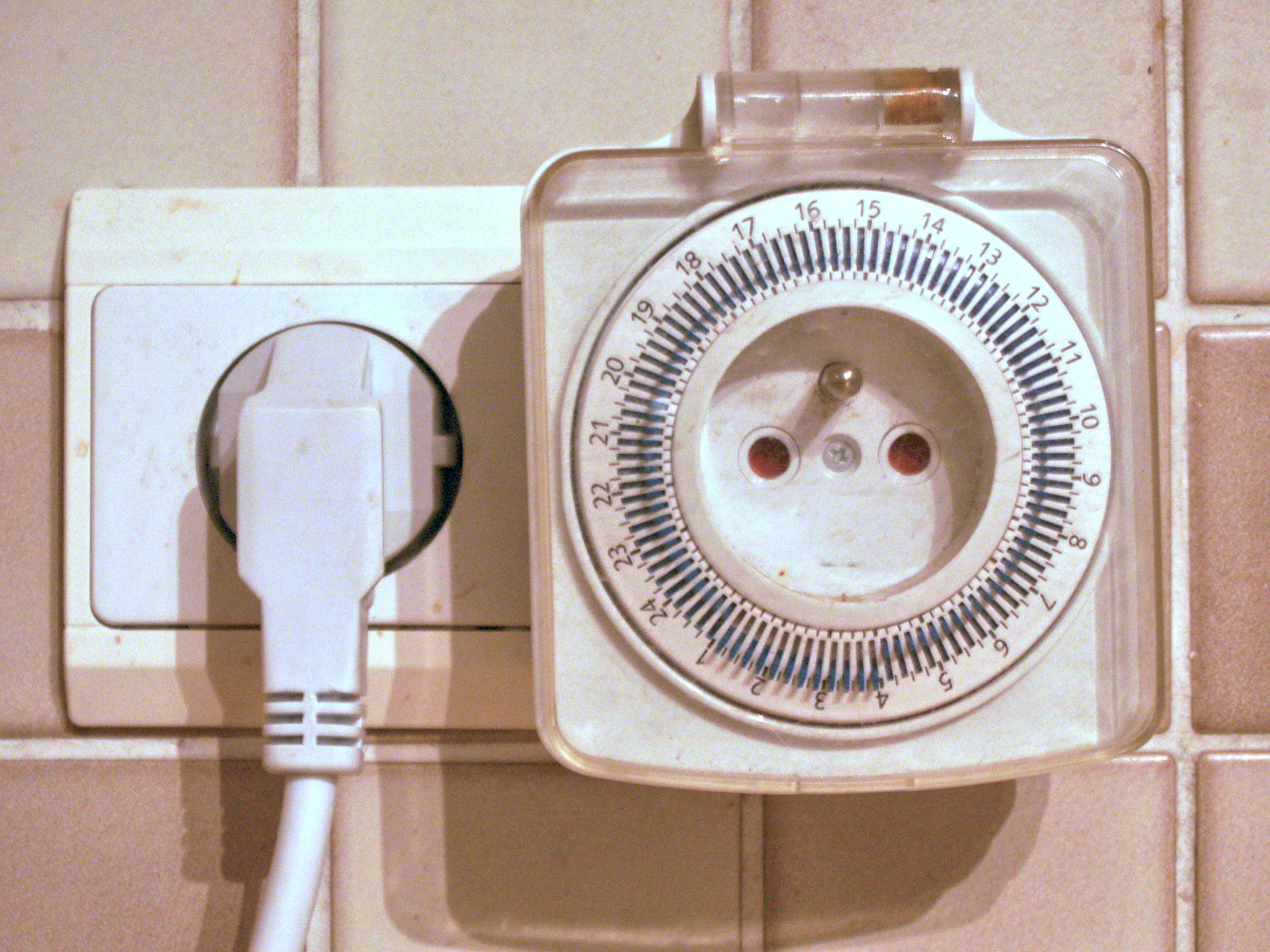
A simple 24-hour cyclical electromechanical time switch with a French CEE 7/5 socket

A time switch (also called a timer switch, or simply timer) is a device that operates an electric switch controlled by a timer.

Intermatic introduced its first time switch in 1945, which was used for "electric signs, store window lighting, apartment hall lights, stokers, and oil and gas burners." A consumer version was added in 1952.

The switch may be connected to an electric circuit operating from mains power, including via a relay or contactor; or low voltage, including battery-operated equipment in vehicles. It may be built into power circuits (as with a central heating or water heater timer), plugged into a wall outlet with equipment plugged into the timer instead of directly into the power point; or built into equipment.

The mechanism may be mechanical (e.g., clockwork; rarely used nowadays), electromechanical (e.g., a slowly rotating geared motor that mechanically operates switches) or electronic, with semiconductor timing circuitry and switching devices and no moving parts.

== Applications ==
A timer may switch equipment on, off, or both, at a preset time or times, after a preset interval, or cyclically. A countdown time switch switches power, usually off, after a preset time. A cyclical timer switches equipment both on and off at preset times over a period, then repeats the cycle; the period is usually 24 hours or 7 days.

For example, a central heating timer may supply heat for a specified period during the morning and evening every weekday, and all day on weekends. A timer for an unattended slow cooker may switch on automatically at a time and for a period suitable to have food ready at mealtime. Likewise, a coffee maker may turn itself on early in the morning in time for awakening residents to have fresh coffee already brewed for them.

Timers may do other processing or have sensors; for example, a timer may switch on lights only during hours of darkness, using a seasonal algorithm or light sensor. Combining the two allows a light to come on at sundown and go off at midnight, for example.

Time switches can be used for many purposes, including saving electric energy by consuming it only when required, switching equipment on, off, or both at times required by some process, and home security (for example switching lights in a pattern that gives the impression that premises are attended) to reduce the likelihood of burglary or prowling.

Among applications are lighting (interior, exterior, and street lighting), cooking devices such as ovens, washing machines, and heating and cooling of buildings and vehicles. Built-in automatic washing machine controllers are examples of very complex electromechanical and electronic timers cycles, starting and stopping many processes including pumps and valves to fill and empty the drum with water, heating, and rotating at different speeds, with different combinations of settings for different fabrics.

== Types ==
=== Sleep timer ===
A sleep timer is a function on many modern televisions and other electronic devices that shuts off the power after a preset amount of time. The setting is usually made either from the remote control of the device or the device's menu. They are intended to allow viewers to watch as they fall asleep.

=== Astronomical timer ===
An astronomical (or astronomic) timer calculates dawn and dusk times (tracking the sun position) for each day of the year based on the latitude and longitude (or just north/central/south and time zone on more cheaply made ones), and the day of the year (month and date), programmed by the user upon installation in addition to the usual time of day, except in the case of GPS enabled astronomic timers wherein all programming is fully automatic. This eliminates the need for a photocell (which may be repeatedly triggered on and off by the light which it operates) or for repeatedly re-setting a regular timer for seasonal changes in the length of day or for daylight-saving time. This allows exterior lighting like a porch light fixture to be controlled by simply replacing its indoor wall switch, or doing the same for a lamp in a dark interior corner (away from a window) by simply plugging-in a self-adjusting lamp timer.

== Gallery ==
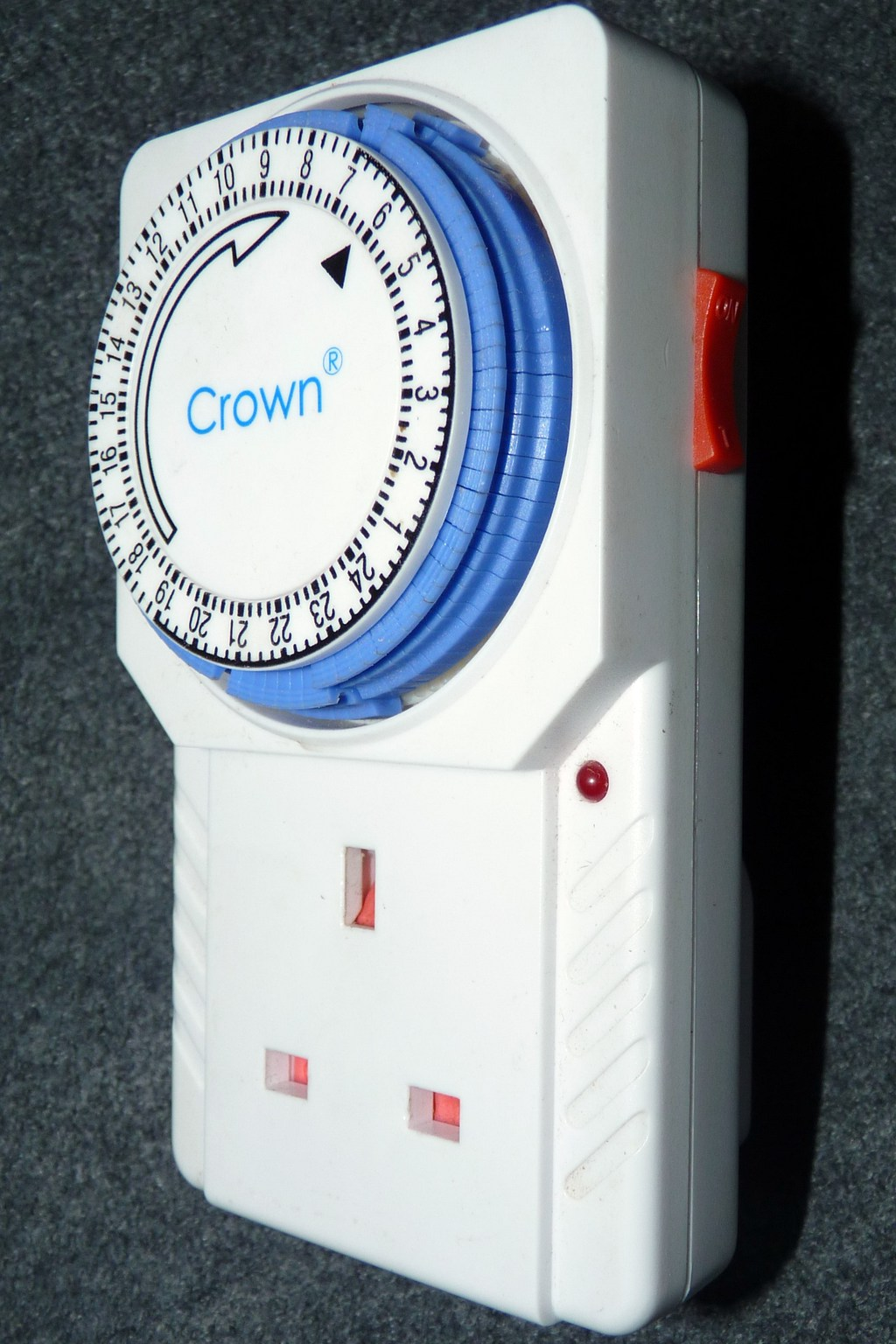
A 24-hour cyclical electromechanical UK time switch showing current time 06:15 and set to be on from 07:00 to 07:45 and 20:00 to 22:00.

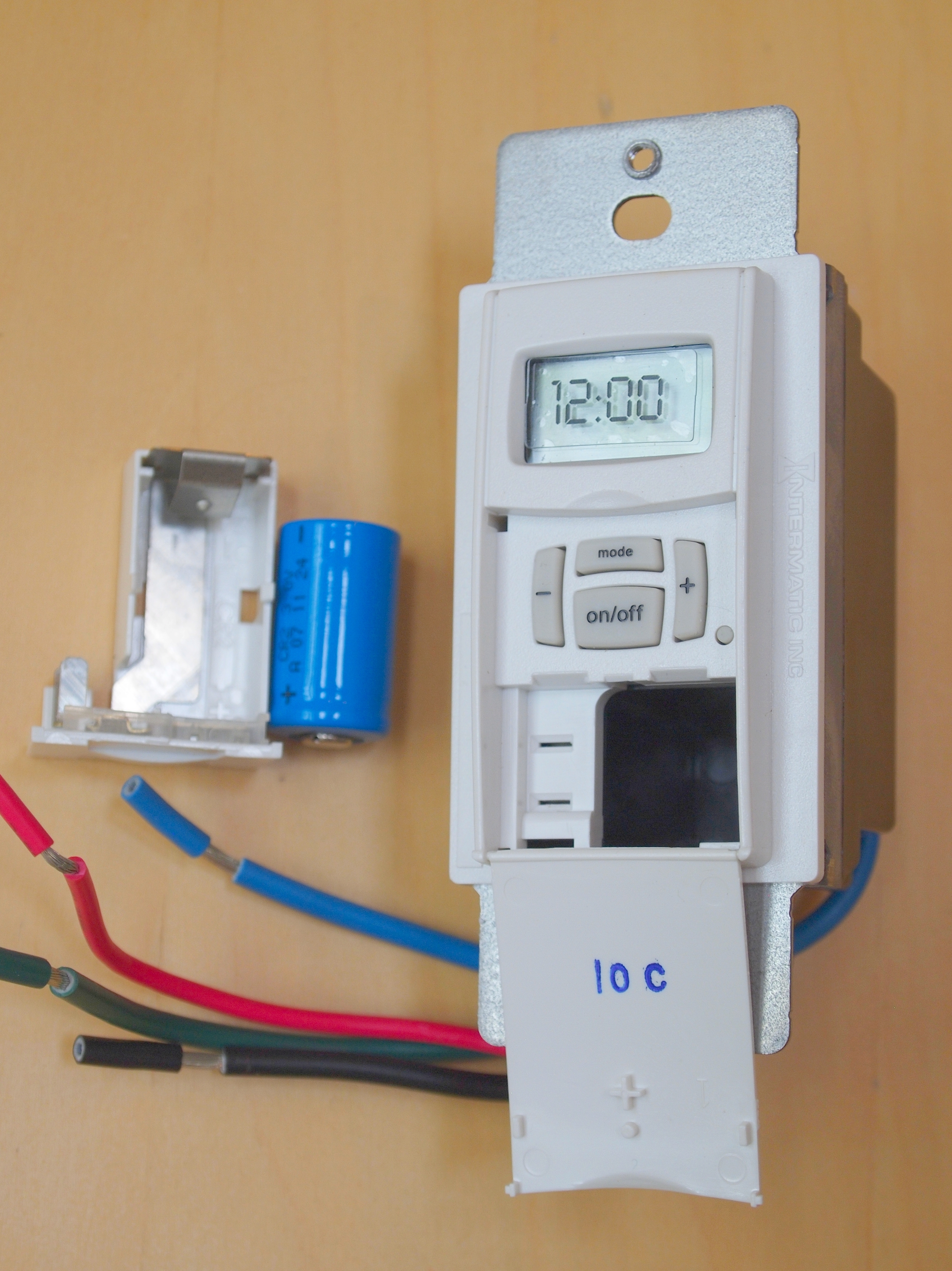
Digital in-wall timer switch with battery for uninterrupted time keeping

== See also ==
- Shabbat clock
