= Namespace security =

Digital security discipline

Namespace security is a digital security discipline that refers to the practices and technologies employed to protect the names and identifiers within a digital namespace from unauthorized access, manipulation, or misuse. It involves ensuring the integrity and security of domain names and other digital identifiers within networked environments, such as the Internet's Domain Name System (DNS), software development namespaces and containerization platforms. Effective namespace security is crucial for maintaining the reliability and trustworthiness of brands and their digital services and for preventing cyber threats including impersonation, domain name hijacking or spoofing of digital identifiers like domain names and social media handles.

== Namespace security in the Domain Name System ==
In the digital age, the significance of namespace security has been magnified as the internet is predominantly navigated through the use of the Domain Name System, which constitutes a collection of namespaces, which together comprise the Internet as defined by the Internet Assigned Numbers Authority (IANA) managed DNS root zone. This includes Top Level Domains (TLDs) such as .com and .net as well as domain names such as google.com and IBM.com.

These digital namespaces and the identifiers they contain are fundamental to maintaining the integrity and security of the internet and its stakeholders. If these identifiers can not be trusted, it erodes the foundational trust in the internet itself. The DNS functions as the internet's phone book, translating human-friendly domain names into IP addresses that computers use to identify each other on the network.

Given its role in internet architecture, securing digital namespaces and identifiers from domain name hijacking, DNS hijacking, DNS spoofing, and other forms of cyber attacks is imperative for the safety of users and the reliability of internet services.

Good namespace security contributes to prevention of corporate identity theft and preserving the trust and confidence of stakeholders. The management and lifecycle oversight of these digital identifiers are essential for mitigating risks associated with cybersecurity vulnerabilities and operational disruptions.

=== Breach examples in DNS Namespace security ===
Namespace Security breaches within the DNS happen regularly on the Internet and can in some scenarios have catastrophic consequences. Examples of namespace breaches include:

Identifier	Type of breach	Description	Notes
forms.ferrari.com	Sub-domain hijack	A genuine Ferrari subdomain was hijacked to promote a counterfeit Ferrari NFT collection, exposing vulnerabilities in digital asset security.	
charts.dft.gov.uk	Sub-domain hijack	A genuine United Kingdom government transport domain name and website were compromised, inadvertently displaying pornographic content.	
galxe.com	Supplier account compromise	The Galxe.com domain was attacked on October 6, 6 AM PDT and re-routed to a phishing site.	
insights.wired.com	Sub-domain hijack	Hackers recently gained control of a subdomain belonging to the technology and science news outlet Wired, exploiting it with online casino content.	

== Namespace security in private namespaces ==
Namespace security within private namespaces, such as those on social media platforms like Twitter (now X), Facebook, TikTok, play a critical role in safeguarding users' digital identities and the integrity of digital interactions. These platforms utilize unique identifiers, commonly known as usernames or handles, to distinguish between millions of users within their private namespaces. Ensuring the security of these namespaces involves preventing unauthorized access, impersonation, and other forms of cyber threats that could compromise user privacy, spread misinformation, or facilitate other malicious activities.

Platforms such as Twitter/X and Facebook implement various security measures, including multi-factor authentication (MFA), rigorous password policies, and automated systems to detect suspicious activities. These measures help to protect users' accounts from being compromised and prevent unauthorized parties from hijacking or misusing identifiers within these private namespaces.

=== Breach examples in namespace security ===
An illustrative example of a breach in namespace security occurred with the hacking of the United States Securities and Exchange Commission's (SEC) X account. The account was compromised due to the apparent lack of two-factor authentication (2FA), a basic but critical layer of security that requires a second form of verification in addition to the password. This incident highlights the vulnerability of digital identifiers to cyber threats and underscores the importance of employing robust security measures to protect identifiers against unauthorized access.

Identifier	Type of breach	Description	Notes
@SECgov (Twitter/X)	Account Compromise	The @SECgov twitter/X account was hijacked to publish unauthorized information.	
@JoeBiden @elonmusk Total of 130 accounts breached (Twitter/X)	Service / Supply chain compromise	Twitter/X accounts were hijacked including for billionaires Elon Musk, Jeff Bezos and Bill Gates. These accounts are among many prominent US figures who have had their identity used for publishing unauthorized information.	
@BritishArmy (Twitter/X and YouTube)	Account compromise	The British army has confirmed a "breach" of its Twitter and YouTube accounts which were used to publish unauthorized information.	

The security of private namespaces is vital for protecting digital identities and the overall integrity of online platforms. As cyber threats continue to evolve, so too must the strategies and technologies employed to defend against them. The incident involving the SEC's Twitter account is a stark reminder of the ongoing need for vigilance and robust security practices in the digital age.

== See also ==
- Cyber-security regulation
- Cyber security standards
- Cybersecurity Information Sharing Act
- List of data breaches
