= Sedo =

Internet domain name and website marketplace

- Type: Private
- Industry: Domain aftermarket
- Parent: United Internet
- Website: sedo.com

Sedo.com, LLC is an American domain aftermarket company headquartered in Cambridge, Massachusetts. The company is a subsidiary of United Internet.

== History ==
=== Sedo ===
Sedo was founded in 2000 by three German college students - Tim Schumacher (previous CEO of Sedo Holding AG), Marius Würzner (now COO of Sedo GmbH's German office), and Ulrich Priesner (currently CTO of Sedo) - and modeled after the core concept of Schumacher's Master's Thesis, "Price Formation in the Trade of Internet Domain Names". In February 2001, with 1&1 Internet AG's investment in the business through purchasing a 41% share, Sedo GmbH became an official entity in Cologne, Germany. During the first few months, the company was operated solely by Schumacher and Essmann while Priesner and Würzner finished their studies. Helga Schackenberg became the first employee of the company, followed soon thereafter by Würzner. At the end of the year, Essmann left the company for nearly two years to complete his medical residency. In the meantime, Sedo moved into a bigger office in Cologne in 2002, and Matt Bentley joined the company to serve in Essmann's absence to oversee Sedo's development. Sedo's funding prior to IPO was N.M. Rothschild Holdings.

Sedo began planning in 2003 to open a subsidiary office in the United States. During this planning phase, Essmann returned to the company with a desire to lead overseas. Bentley and Essmann headed to America, with Jeremiah Johnston joining the team shortly afterwards as General Counsel. In 2005, the Sedo office was opened in Cambridge, Massachusetts (USA), under Sedo.com, LLC.

In 2006, CEO Tim Schumacher temporarily joined the Cambridge office to assist with expansion into the US market, and the company introduced domain name auctions. In 2007, Sedo took a minority investment in DomainsBot; DomainsBot's technology later contributed to the update of Sedo's domain search tool. The company acquired GreatDomains.com, a competing online domain name marketplace, from VeriSign on June 19, 2007.

Logo as of 2011

Logo as of 2014

Expansion continued in 2008 as Sedo opened up shop in the United Kingdom, an operation headed by Hugo Dalrymple-Smith and Nora Nanayakkara. On February 24, 2009, Sedo purchased RevenueDirect, and formed a strategic partnership with its parent company, Dotster of Vancouver, Washington, to take advantage of the latter's services of helping businesses establish online profiles. In March 2009, Sedo provided seed funding for the new start up Bloson.com, a social charity website. Later in September 2009, Sedo acquired a competing domain monetization (parking) site, ParkingPanel, for an undisclosed amount. On February 17, 2010, Sedo helped broker the purchase for the most expensive .org domain name ever—poker.org—for US$1 million. PokerCompany.com purchased the domain name. Later that year, Sedo was awarded a Guinness World Records record for the sale of sex.com, the most expensive public domain sale at $13,000,000.

On February 1, 2012, Tim Schumacher left his role as CEO of Sedo Holding AG to focus on other projects and join the company's supervisory board. Tobias Flaitz, formerly of the privately held German-based Hubert Burda Media, joined Sedo as the new CEO of both Sedo Holding AG (including Sedo's sister company, Affili.net) and Sedo.

=== Sedo Holding AG ===
Logo of the holding company as of 2013

In 2009, Sedo's sister company within the Adlink Group, AdLINK Media, was sold to the Hi-media Group. This sale led to the reorganization and renaming of the group to Sedo Holding AG in 2010. That same year, Sedo welcomed its sister company, Affilinet, to its Cologne office. Tim Schumacher was named CEO of Sedo Holding AG while retaining his leadership role within Sedo, and Liesbeth Mack-de Boer was named Chief Sales Officer (CSO) of Sedo.

== Sales history ==
Sedo reports the following domain sales as the 20 highest sales they have helped broker since their inception in 2001:

Rank	Domain Name	Sale Price (in US$)	Date
1	Sex.com	13,000,000 (Guinness World Records record)	2010
2	Vodka.com	3,000,000	2006
3	Shopping.de	2,858,945 (est. currency exchange)	2008
4	Gambling.com	2,500,000	2011
5	Pizza.com	2,600,000	7/7/2008
6	Fly.com	1,800,000	6/25/2009
7	Russia.com	1,500,000	2009
8	Games.co.uk	1,300,000	11/21/2007
9	Bot.ai	1,200,000	2/25/2026
10	Kredit.de	1,169,175	12/4/2008
11	Chinese.com	1,120,000	7/23/2007
12	Sexe.com	1,150,000	10/29/2007
13	Call.com	1,100,000	2/9/2009
14	Invest.com	1,015,000	9/29/2008
15	Poker.org	1,000,000 (highest .org sale on record)	2010
16	Server.com	770,000	7/31/2009
17	Ringtones.com	750,000	2010
18	Website.com	750,000	2005
19	Files.com	725,000	2009
20	Telecom.com	700,000	2007
