= .gent =

Internet top-level domain

- Introduced: 2014
- TLD type: Top-level domain
- Status: active
- Registry: Dot Gent Registry
- Sponsor: Combell
- Intended use: Ghent residents
- Registry website: nic.gent

.gent is a GeoTLD for Ghent (Dutch: Gent, French: Gand), Flanders in Belgium.

== See also ==
- .be
- .vlaanderen
- .brussels
