= Internet Domain Name Index =

Internet Domain Name Index (IDNX) is a price index for Internet domain names that tracks changes in the value of domains at the aggregate level. The index builds on the premise that domain names are comparable to developable land. Domains are seen as "locations" on the Internet where companies or individuals can set up a business or just a personal homepage. This core analogy warrants the transfer of theoretical and empirical frameworks from academic real estate research to Internet domains as "virtual land". IDNX was launched in July 2011 by Thies Lindenthal.

The period covered by IDNX reaches back to January 2006. Internet domain name prices exhibit a strong correlation to the IT stocks as measured by the NASDAQ index. When the IT industry is doing well, prices of domain names tend to rise. In periods of falling stock prices, domains prices usually fall as well. This co-movement shows that domain names are not an asset class on their own, but that the "real" and the "virtual" economy are closely linked.

IDNX is estimated in two steps. First, a hedonic repeat sales regression gives 12 annual price indices, all starting at different months of the year. By looking at repeat sales of similar domains, the inherent quality of the domains is controlled for. In a second step, these staggered annual indices are converted to a monthly index using a frequency conversion technique developed by David Geltner and Sheharyar Bokhari (both from MIT). First estimating indexes at the annual frequency and later converting them to monthly numbers reduces the volatility in index estimates without imposing an explicit time-structure.

The empirical estimations are based on a large data set of more than 200,000 (as of October 2011) real domain transactions facilitated by the domain market place Sedo.
