= Site license =

Software licensing for groups of users

A site license is a type of software license that allows the user to install a software package in several computers simultaneously, such as at a particular site (facility) or across a corporation. Depending on the amount of fees paid, the license may be unlimited or may limit simultaneous access to a certain number of users. The latter is called a concurrent site license.

== Overview ==
The term "site" may not necessarily refer to a physical site or geographic location. It is simply defines a limitation on the user's access rights. The usage of the term dates back to 1950s, when mainframes limited to a specific sites were being used. Nowadays, these types of licenses are rare, but still used in some sectors like manufacturing. Vendors may insert clauses that would allow representatives to visit the site and verify that the software usage conforms to the license.

Site licenses are sometimes called multiseat licenses in implied distinction from individual (single-seat) licenses; this usage parallels the terminology of multiseat configurations for mainframes, with the same figurative analogy of multiple workers each seated in front of an instance (one terminal or one copy of the application). The cost of the license can then be analyzed in terms of cost per installed seat, with the idea being that such cost must be lower if site licensing is to be advantageous over individual licensing.

Another aspect, aside from cost, is convenience. Some software vendors had one-floppy per computer restrictions, which the New York Times described as "the equivalent of a book publisher insisting that no two people could use the same book, even at different times." A different inconvenience was copy protection, which was deprecated as crippleware.

== Customization ==
Customizations, subset, restricted and specialized licensing arrangements are among those arrangements that are beyond individual single-copy licenses. One such pricing, for a customized "site licensing" refers to deals made by large institutions, like universities, with software firms so that affiliated persons can buy the software at discounted prices. Web-only is another customization, particularly when the alternative is paper-based.

== See also ==
- Shelfware
