= Brochureware =

Term to describe non-interactive websites

Brochureware was a term used to describe "simply listing products and services on a Web site." To emphasize what's lacking, Advertising Age referred to "static brochureware" – it just stands there and "is little more than a brochure."

== Overview ==
The New York Times wrote that it's "not the kindest of terms." IBM's initial online annual report was "standard brochureware: sticking the print annual report on the Web;" the third year they made it "easy to navigate" and added features to enable viewers to "create charts slicing the company's figures any number of bean-counting ways." In 1999 The Economist referred to "stodgily designed billboards, known in the business as brochureware which do little more than ..." Pre-Y2K political websites were described as "bland brochureware."

== History ==
'Get us on the internet' was the mandate at a time when low dial-up speeds did not allow much use of computer graphics, and interactive features were minimal. "They put us on the internet" was a praiseworthy accomplishment.

Even after Y2K it was considered news to headline "Toyota Elevating Its Site From Brochureware." Technology was not the only obstacle. In 1997, it was still the case that "Federal financial disclosure regulations still favor paper over electrons" (something not scheduled to be remedied by SEC rule changes until 2021). Even brochureware was not that simple: "brochureware that works in multiple languages" was needed.

The computer industry's trade shows were described as hype, crowds, and "bags of brochureware." Concurrently, half of the advertising field's top 10 agencies were shoeless shoemakers, and Advertising Age wrote: "Three of the top agencies have pages that boast a full site will be coming…"

== xWare ==
Earlier than brochureware was the use of the word vaporware. Based on an alleged 1982 coining of the word following Ann Winblad's investigating Microsoft Xenix's non-future, Esther Dyson publicized the word in 1983: the first time it appeared in print. By 1985, Computerworld used the word in a survey. A still earlier xWare-related word is FUD: Fear, uncertainty, and doubt.

Shelfware is a computer-industry term still in use.
