= Domain name front running =

Use of inside information to register domains for resell or ad revenue

Domain name front running is the practice whereby a domain name registrar uses insider information to register domains for the purpose of re-selling them or earning revenue via ads placed on the domain's landing page. By registering the domains, the registrar locks out other potential registrars from selling the domain to a customer. The registrar typically takes advantage of the five-day "domain tasting" trial period, where the domain can be locked without payment.

The term was coined by domain investor and retired stockbroker Daniel Stager. ICANN "likens this activity to front running in stock and commodities markets and calls this behavior domain name front running. ... There does not appear to be a strong set of standards and practices to conclude whether monitoring availability checks is an acceptable or unacceptable practice."

== Network Solutions lawsuit ==
In January 2008, it was reported that Network Solutions uses data collected from their web-based WHOIS search to register every domain that users check for availability. Although the practice forces users to register the searched-for domains from Network Solutions, Network Solutions defends the practice, claiming that "This protection measure provides our customers the opportunity to register domains they have previously searched without the fear that the name will be already taken through Front Running." However, during the four-day period, the domain is still up for sale to the general public solely through Network Solutions and is not, in fact, reserved for a specific person at all.

On February 25, 2008, law firms Kabateck LLP, (then Kabateck Brown Kellner), and Engstrom, Lipscomb & Lack, filed class-action lawsuits, McElroy v. Network Solutions LLC, et al. and James Lee Finseth v. Network Solutions LLC, against the company for front running, which was settled in favor of the plaintiffs, in 2009.

In June 2008, Network Solutions proposed a small fee for domain tasting, in part to end the practice of domain name front running.

== See also ==
- Drop registrar
- Principal–agent problem (An economic theory applicable to front running, where domain registrars are agents, and domain name users are principals)
