= .vlaanderen =

Internet top-level domain for Flanders, Belgium

- Introduced: 2014
- TLD type: GeoTLD
- Registry: DNS Belgium
- Sponsor: DNS Belgium
- Intended use: Entities connected with Flanders
- Registry website: www.dnsbelgium.be/nl

.vlaanderen is a generic top-level domain for Flanders, Belgium first introduced in 2014.

== History ==
In mid-2011, ICANN, the umbrella organization for domain names, decided that organizations could apply for their own Top-Level Domain (TLD). In addition to the existing country codes such as .be and generic extensions such as .com, extensions such as .ibm, .shop or .limburg were also possible. The first applications could be submitted to ICANN from 12 January 2012. This expansion is particularly interesting for brands, but also for geographical, ethnic and linguistic organizations and institutions. All newly created extensions belong to the group of gTLDs or 'generic Top Level Domains', as opposed to the country codes, which has consequences for their management. DNS.be was immediately one of the candidates to drive the geographical gTLDs.

At the beginning of 2012, the Flemish and Brussels governments respectively assigned the management of the gTLDs .vlaanderen and .brussels to DNS.be. DNS.be prepared and submitted the application file for ICANN. After approval, it is responsible for technical and commercial exploitation for 10 years. The formula chosen for the partnership is that of the service concession.

In 2012, three applications were submitted to ICANN for generic top-level domains for Belgium. These places were raffled, putting .gent in the 1,021th place, .vlaanderen in the 1,416th place and .brussels in the 1,518th place. Because ICANN handles about 1000 applications per year, a commissioning in 2014 was anticipated.

In 2013, after the extension was officially approved, criticism of the name came from the Flemish business community. A survey of 291 Flemish companies by BeCommerce revealed that 73% of companies were critical of a new top-level domain. On the other hand, a survey by the Flemish government in 2013 showed that 62% of the 258 municipalities are positive about the new extension.

On 7 February 2014 DNS Belgium (now renamed) signed the contract with ICANN for the management of .vlaanderen and .brussels.

ICANN reported on 21 March that year that the applications for .vlaanderen and .brussels have passed the technical tests.

On 18 June 2014 ICANN announced that .vlaanderen and .brussels have been delegated, adding them to the DNS root zone. As a result, the first URLs with these new extensions also exist: nic.vlaanderen and nic.brussels.

On 9 July 2014 ICANN approved the startup information. That is the information about the different launch phases and their timing.

This also means that all data of the different phases are officially recorded:

- Brand owner phase: 01 Sep 2014 - 01 Oct 2014
- Phase for local authorities and organizations: 02 Oct 2014 - 03 Nov 2014
- Phase for individuals: 13 Nov 2014 - 15 Dec 2014
- Landrush 16 Dec 2014 - 15 Jan 2015
- Free registrations since 20 Jan 2015

At the end of January 2016, the number of registrations stood at approximately 7000. About 1000 were allocated to institutions of the Flemish government and related organizations. As a result, the number fell short of government expectations.

== See also ==
- .be
- .gent
- .brussels
