= Type-In =

Type-In is an arranged meeting of manual typewriting enthusiasts. A typical Type-In may include the following activities: a typing speed competition; distribution of stationery, envelopes and stamps, followed by a typed letter-writing session; the swapping and purchasing of typewriters.

The first Type-In was held on December 18. 2010, in Philadelphia, at Bridgewater's Pub in 30th Street Station. About a dozen people attended and more than 25 typewriters were on display. The event was organised by Michael McGettigan, owner of a local bicycle shop, Trophy Bikes, and was publicized with posters, emails, and a small mailing to writers, English professors, thrift stores and cafes. The event was also publicized on a blog site named Philly Typer, posted by McGettigan. The event received media attention all out of proportion to its size. At the start of the event, journalists outnumbered the attendees in the Type-In 3:1, though this ratio improved as the meeting progressed.

Coverage, especially by the Philadelphia Daily News and the Associated Press, led to other Type-Ins around the U.S. and in Basel, Switzerland. The Type-In name spread casually through the "Typosphere" an already-established band of manual typewriter fans around the U.S. and in other countries. Type-Ins have been held in libraries, cafes, and bookstores.
