= EURid =

Domain name registry for the .eu domain

- Formation: 8 April 2003
- Type: Internet domain registry
- Location: European Union
- Website: eurid.eu

EURid vzw (European Registry for Internet Domains) is the nonprofit organisation appointed by the European Commission as the domain name registry that operates the .eu top-level domain and its variants in other scripts – .ею (.eu in Cyrillic) as of 1 June 2016, .ευ (in Greek) as of 14 November 2019.

== Operations ==
In May 2003 the Commission designated it as the .eu domain name registry, with EURid to be established in Belgium as a consortium of two European ccTLD operators: DNS Belgium (.be) and IIT-CNR (.it). The proponents expected a million domain names to be registered within the first year.

EURid uses the Extensible Provisioning Protocol (EPP) which enables registrars to perform operations on .eu domain names directly.

EURid's website is available in the 24 official languages of the European Union.

== Services ==
As the registry for the .eu top-level domain name, EURid provides citizens and businesses in the European Union and beyond with a domain for their websites.

The organisation cooperates with law-enforcement authorities like Europol. Digital sovereignty is a key goal - EURid uses EU-based software service providers and decentralised infrastructure wherever possible in order to minimise risk.

EURid's security initiatives include the Abuse Prevention Early Warning System (APEWS), to identify potentially malicious registrations before they can cause harm, and EURidity, a data quality system to prevent the registration of harmful domain names and automate their swift removal. EURid's official website is available in the 24 official languages of the European Union.

=== Domain holders outside the European Union ===
Residents, companies and organisations based in countries within the European Economic Area (EEA) but outside the European Union are able to use .eu domains, namely Iceland, Liechtenstein or Norway.

On 1 January 2021, EURid disabled all domains belonging to UK individuals and businesses following Brexit, upon which the United Kingdom left the EEA.

== Policy ==
EURid's stated mission is to support the European Digital Single Market by providing a safe and trustworthy online environment where multilingualism can thrive, by helping European citizens and businesses build a strong, secure, and reliable online presence that transcends borders.

As part of its mandate, EURid promotes the EU's internet governance objectives through a multi-stakeholder approach, including active participation in global and European fora and support for various activities. Strategic partnerships across the continent and beyond are key in these efforts, as well as outreach, educational and awareness-building campaigns.

EURid funds awareness-building initiatives aimed and training activities at promoting the .eu domain name and its role in connecting Europe's online community. EURid runs advisory bodies for registrars and its Youth Committee.

EURid claims to be committed to sustainability. In 2012, it became the first European top-level domain registry to obtain EU Eco-Management and Audit Scheme (EMAS) registration. Since then, EURid has contributed to various reforestation and agricultural projects to help offset its emissions.
