= Human trafficking in Belgium =

Belgium is a source, destination, and transit country for men, women, and children subjected to trafficking in persons, specifically forced labor and forced prostitution. Victims originate in Eastern Europe, Africa, East Asia, as well as Brazil and India. Some victims are smuggled through Belgium to other European countries, where they are subjected to forced labor and forced prostitution. Male victims are subjected to forced labor and exploitation in restaurants, bars, sweatshops, horticulture sites, fruit farms, construction sites, and retail shops. There were reportedly seven Belgian women subjected to forced prostitution in Luxembourg in 2009. According to a 2009 ECPAT Report, the majority of girls and children subjected to forced prostitution in Belgium originate from Balkan and CIS countries, Eastern Europe, Asia (Thailand, China) and West Africa (particularly Nigeria); some young foreign boys are exploited in prostitution in major cities in the country. Local observers also report that a large portion of children trafficked in Belgium are unaccompanied, vulnerable asylum seekers and refugees. Criminal organizations from Thailand use Thai massage parlors in Belgium, which are run by Belgian managers, to sexually exploit young Thai women. These networks are involved in human smuggling and trafficking to exploit victims economically and sexually. Belgium is not only a destination country, but also a transit country for children to be transported to other European country destinations.

According to the Belgian immigration office, the government identified eight children between January and June 2009 as trafficked. Foreign workers continued to be subjected to involuntary domestic servitude in Belgium, some involving members of the international diplomatic community posted in Belgium.

The Government of Belgium fully complies with the minimum standards for the elimination of trafficking. The government demonstrated it vigorously investigated, prosecuted, and convicted trafficking offenders. It continued to fund NGOs to provide comprehensive protection and assistance to victims subjected to forced prostitution and forced labor in 2009. U.S. State Department's Office to Monitor and Combat Trafficking in Persons placed the country in "Tier 1" in 2017.

== Prosecution ==
Belgium prohibits all forms of trafficking through a 2005 amendment to its 1995 Act Containing Measures to Repress Trafficking in Persons. As amended, the law’s maximum prescribed penalties for all forms of trafficking – 30 years’ imprisonment – is sufficiently stringent and commensurate with penalties prescribed for other serious crimes, such as rape. The government reported prosecuting 387 trafficking suspects in 2009 and convicting 151 trafficking offenders in 2008; sentences for 146 convicted traffickers ranged from less than one year to 10 years in prison. According to a 2009 UNO DC Report, the Belgian government aggregated law enforcement data on trafficking into a single data base which conflates smuggling with trafficking offenses; the government, however, reported that all 151 convicted persons in 2008 were convicted for trafficking-specific offenses. The government did not disaggregate this data to demonstrate how many people were convicted for sex trafficking versus forced labor. Furthermore, the failure of an employer to meet wage, hours, and working conditions in accordance with prevailing labor legislation and collective bargaining agreements constitutes “exploitation” under Belgium’s anti-trafficking law. An EU Schengen evaluation report issued in December 2009, stated that anti-trafficking prosecutors in Belgium report difficulty distinguishing between sexual exploitation as such, and sexual exploitation related to trafficking; this report also noted prosecutor’s difficulty in separating a victim of trafficking from economic exploitation from one of illegal employment. Furthermore, this evaluation reported that despite adequate legislation, the government convicted a relatively low number of offenders for nonconsensual sexual and economic exploitation. The report, however, praised the government for its multidisciplinary approach on trafficking cases and highlighted it as a best practice in Europe.

The government previously reported that it charged eight family members of the royal family of Abu Dhabi (UAE) with human trafficking in 2008 for subjecting 17 girls to forced servitude while staying at a Brussels hotel. The government reportedly has not yet scheduled trial proceedings for this case, though they were to have occurred in early 2010. The implicated sheikha and seven other family members have not returned to Belgium. The government reported its prosecution in 2009 of two Belgian consular officers posted in Bulgaria in 1990 for issuing fraudulent visas to traffickers operating under the cover of travel agencies. The government incarcerated a Ministry of Justice and a state security official arrested in January 2009 for being suspected of assisting a ring subjecting 17 Thai women to forced prostitution in massage parlors.

== Protection ==
The government continued its efforts to protect victims of trafficking; however it reported a decrease in the number of trafficking victims identified and referred for protection in 2009. The government continued to fund three NGOs to shelter and provide comprehensive assistance to trafficking victims. These three NGOs assisted 465 potential trafficking victims during the reporting period; 158 of these were new referrals, a significant decline from the 495 total identified and referred in 2008. The government reported 103 victims of sexual and economic exploitation filed applications for temporary residency in Belgium in 2009, but did not provide the number of residency permits that were officially granted. The government reportedly used proactive procedures to identify victims of trafficking based on a 2008 interagency directive on coordination and assistance to trafficking victims; a December 2009 EU Schengen evaluation cited the guidelines for victim identification as a best practice. Belgian law allows the provision of extendable temporary residence status and permanent residence status to victims who participated in trafficking investigations and prosecutions. Residence can be granted before an investigation is completed at judicial discretion; residency can also be granted even without a successful prosecution. Children who were victims of trafficking reportedly were granted three months in which to decide whether to testify against their traffickers. According to a 2009 End Child Prostitution in Asia Tourism (ECPAT) report, Belgian officials will only officially recognize a person as a victim of trafficking if that person has broken off all contact with their traffickers, agrees to counseling at a specialized reception center, and officially files a complaint against the traffickers. The report noted that these conditions for victim assistance are too high for child victims to meet. According to the government, if a child did not qualify for victim status, they may still have qualified for protection under the government’s rules for unaccompanied minors. Victims who served as prosecutors’ witnesses in court were entitled to seek legal employment during the relevant legal proceedings. A report released by the government in December 2009 noted that undocumented victims of economic exploitation often hesitate to collaborate with law enforcement, fearing deportation. The report also noted that victims of economic exploitation occasionally end up in centers for rejected asylum seekers before being directed to shelters. Identified victims were not inappropriately incarcerated, fined, or penalized for unlawful acts committed as a direct result of being trafficked. IOM reported it repatriated five victims of trafficking, three adults and two unaccompanied minors, in 2009.

== Prevention ==
The Government of Belgium sustained its progress to prevent trafficking in 2009. The government continued to fund its ongoing “Stop Child Prostitution” prevention program in 2009. It reported that Belgian authorities launched an information campaign to increase identification and protection for Brazilian victims of forced labor. In 2009, the government issued a flyer in 27 languages for potential trafficking victims distributed by the police, the shelters, and available in airports and railway stations. In April 2009, in partnership with an NGO, the government held a colloquium in the Belgian Senate to generate greater parliamentary interest in trafficking issues. Reportedly, Brussels, Antwerp, and Liege took measures to reduce the demand for commercial sex acts during the reporting period. Following the example of Brussels and Antwerp, the Liege city government closed 51 brothels in September 2008, limiting prostitution to a few registered bars. Belgian law allows for the prosecution of Belgian nationals for child abuse crimes committed abroad. The Belgian authorities identified child sex tourism as a serious problem among Belgian nationals, but reported no prosecutions of such activity. The government provided specific anti-trafficking training to Belgian troops before they were deployed on international peacekeeping missions.

== See also ==
- Human rights in Belgium
- Prostitution in Belgium
