= .brussels =

Internet top-level domain

- Introduced: 2014
- TLD type: GeoTLD
- Status: active
- Registry: DNS Belgium
- Sponsor: DNS Belgium vzw/asbl
- Intended use: Brussels capital city residents
- Registry website: dnsbelgium.be

.brussels is a generic top-level domain for Brussels, Belgium. Registry DNS Belgium, who are also responsible for .be, got permission to operate this domain and execute these at the end of 2014, together with .vlaanderen.

== History ==
Around 2011, ICANN, the governing body for domain names, decided organisations could request their own top-level domain name (TLD). Besides the existing country codes such as .be and generic extensions like .com, it became possible to have extensions such as .ibm, .shop or .limburg. The first requests could be submitted to ICANN on 12 January 2012. This extension was mostly interesting for brands, but also for geographic, linguistic and ethnic organisations and institutions. All these newly created top-level domains are considered 'generic Top Level Domains' (gTLD). This is in contrast to national codes, which also means they are administered differently. DNS.be immediately became a candidate to manage the geographic gTLDs.

At the start of 2012, the Flemish Government and Brussels Government respectively appointed the management of gTLDs .vlaanderen and .brussels to DNS.be. DNS.be created and submitted the request to ICANN. After approval, they will take on the responsibility of technical and commercial exploitation of the domains for 10 years. The chosen partnership was one of concession of services.

In 2012, three applications were made to ICANN for generic top-level domains on behalf of Belgium. These places were raffled off, landing .gent on the 1,021st place, .vlaanderen on the 1,416th place and .brussels in 1,518th place. Because ICANN handles about 1,000 applications a year, people were already anticipating a 2014 inauguration.

On February 7, 2014, DNS Belgium (since changed its name) signed the contract with ICANN for the management of .vlaanderen and .brussels.

ICANN announced on March 21 that year that the applications for .vlaanderen and .brussels had passed the technical tests.

On June 18, 2014, ICANN announced that .vlaanderen and .brussels have been delegated. Concretely, this means that they have been added to the DNS root zone. As a result, the first URLs with these new extensions also exist: nic.vlaanderen and nic.brussels.

On July 9, 2014, the approval came for the startup information by ICANN. (The information about the different launch phases and their timing)

The schedule for the phases was:

- Phase for brandholders: 01/09/2014 > 01/10/2014
- Phase for local governments and organisations: 02/10/2014 > 03/11/2014
- Phase for private companies: 13/11/2014 > 15/12/2014
- Landrush 16/12/2014 > 15/01/2015
- Free registration from 20/01/2015 onwards

== See also ==
- .be
- .gent
- .vlaanderen
- List of Internet top-level domains
