= Intermatic =

American company

Intermatic Inc.
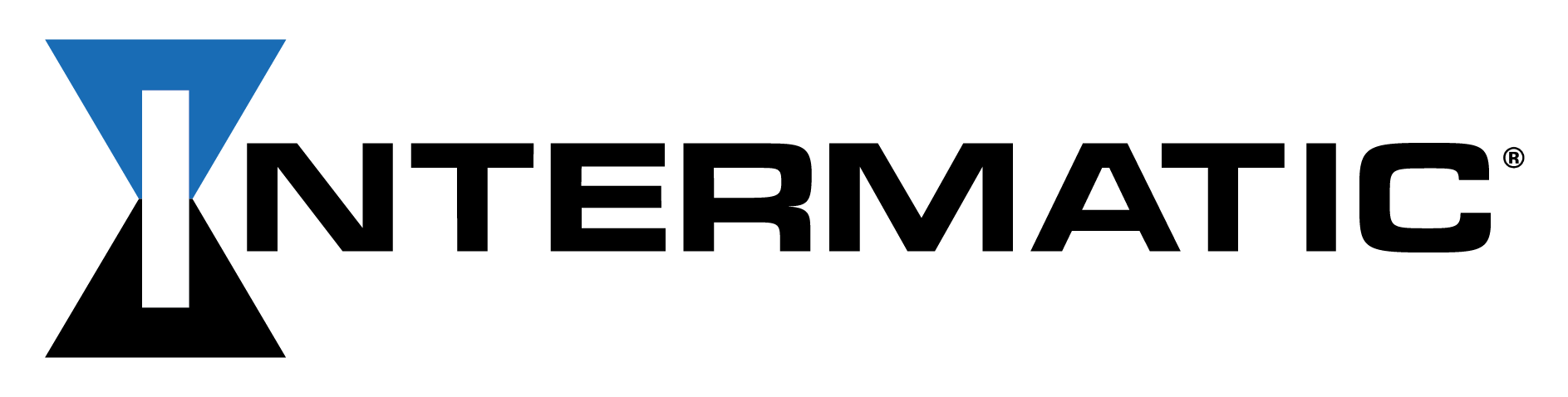

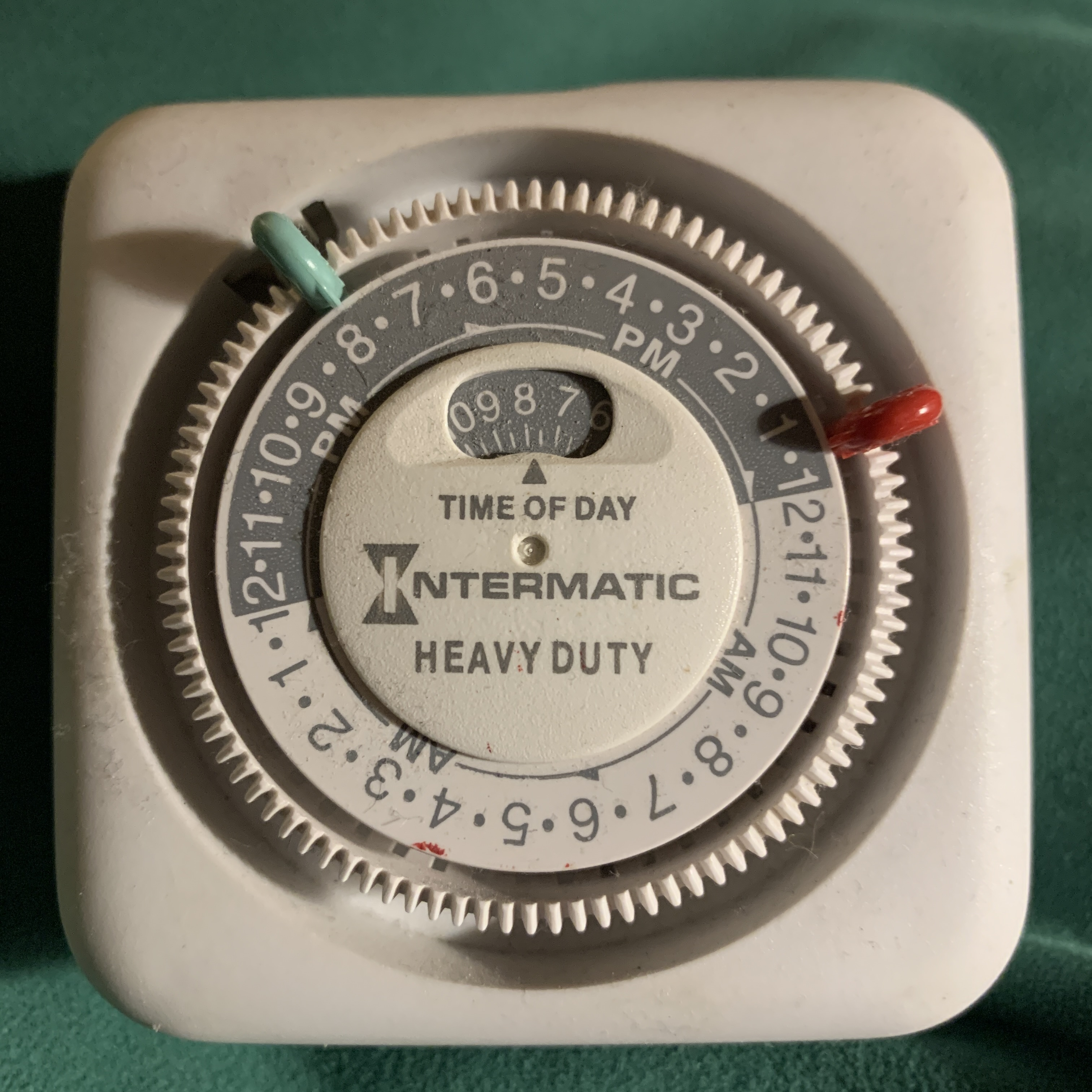
- Industry: Electrical equipment
- Predecessor: International Register Company
- Founded: 1891; 135 years ago in Chicago, Illinois, USA
- Founder: Arthur Woodward
- Headquarters: Libertyville, Illinois, USA
- Owner: MPE Partners
- Number of employees: 250 to 1000 (2022)
- Website: intermatic.com

Intermatic Inc. is an American manufacturer of time switches based in Libertyville, Illinois. Previously based in Spring Grove, Illinois for 60 years, the company headquarters and 125 jobs relocated to Innovation Park business center, formerly Motorola’s International R&D facility, in Libertyville in 2021.

== History ==
Intermatic Incorporated was founded in 1891 in Chicago, Illinois as the International Register Company to produce fare registers. Its founder was A.H. Woodward who held several patents on fare registers (mechanical devices for recording passenger ticket and ridership).

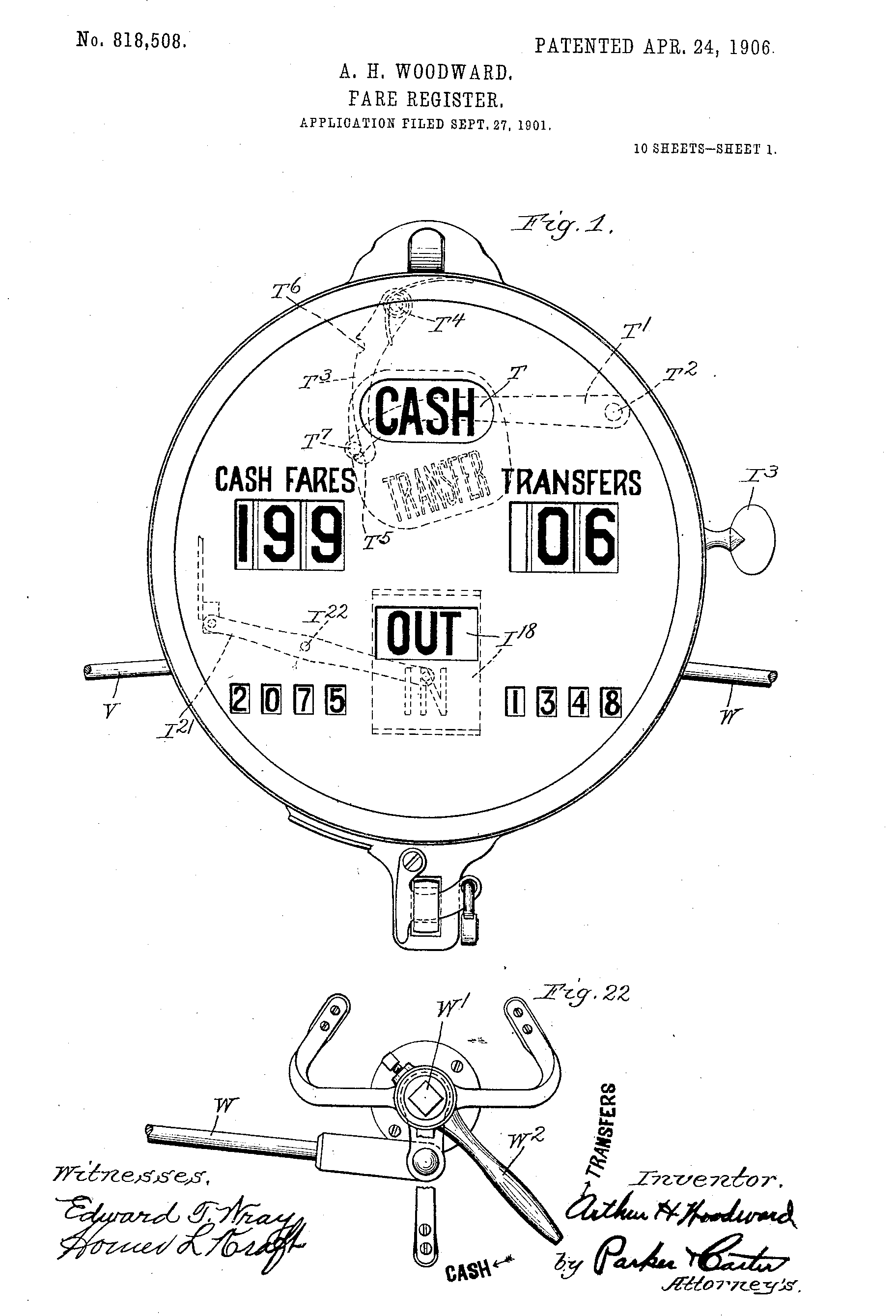
A register for recording transit fares by A. H. Woodward of the International Register Co.

It introduced its first lighting timer in 1945, and today makes timing and control systems for line and low voltage systems used in residential, commercial, government, and industrial systems.

The company sells the Time-All line of timers for consumer applications.

On April 23, 2025, MPE Partners announced that it had acquired the company.
