= DNS Belgium =

- Founded: 17 June 1999

DNS Belgium is a non-profit organisation responsible for managing the ccTLD .be top level domain, as well as the new gTLD domain extensions .brussels and .vlaanderen. Domain names are registered by the various agents of DNS Belgium, on behalf of their individual clients, as part of a decentralised registration and applications procedure.

Established in 1999 by the Internet Service Providers Association, Fabrimetal and the Belgium Telecommunications Users Group, DNS Belgium adopted this decentralised network of registrars on December 11, 2000 in order to create a simpler, automated procedure for the registration of domain names. Since 2003, the company has been party to a data escrow agreement, to ensure continuity of services. The organisation's name is derived, in part, from the term domain name server. In 2012 DNS Belgium was awarded the management of the new gTLD extensions .vlaanderen and .brussels, both of which were launched in the summer of 2014.

DNS.be is a founder member of the EURid consortium which administers the .eu TLD, and provided the model upon which that organization is based.
