= Domain tasting =

Practice of temporarily registering a domain

Domain tasting is the practice of temporarily registering a domain under the five-day Add Grace Period at the beginning of the registration of an ICANN-regulated second-level domain. During this period, a registration must be fully refunded by the domain name registry if cancelled. This was designed to address accidental registrations, but domain tasters have used the practice for illicit purposes.

== Overview ==
In April 2006, out of 35 million registrations, about 2 million were permanent or actually purchased. By February 2007, the CEO of Go Daddy reported that of 55.1 million domain names registered, 51.5 million were canceled and refunded just before the 5 day grace period expired and only 3.6 million domain names were actually kept. ICANN's registry report for February 2007 shows that 55,794,877 .com and .net domain names were deleted in that month alone.

Domain tasting is lucrative in a number of ways:

1. The registrant conducts a cost-benefit analysis on the viability of deriving income from potential advertising on the domain's website. Domain names that are deemed potentially lucrative and retained in a registrant's portfolio often represent domains that were previously used and have since expired, misspellings of other popular sites, or generic terms that may receive type-in traffic.
2. Domains are usually still active in search engines and other hyperlinks and therefore receive enough traffic such that advertising revenue exceeds the cost of the registration.
3. The registrant may also derive revenue from eventual sale of the domain, at a premium, to a third party or the previous owner.
4. Tasted domains may sometimes be used for spamming and then discarded.

== Anti-domain tasting measures ==
In January 2008, ICANN proposed several possible solutions, including the elimination of the exemption on transaction costs (US$0.20) during the five-day grace period, which would effectively make the practice of domain tasting not viable. The ICANN operating plan and budget for Fiscal Year 2009 included a section intended to deal with the problem of domain tasting. Now the transaction fee of $0.18 is applied to domains deleted in the Add Grace Period where the number of such domains exceeds 10% of the net new registrations or 50 domains, whichever is greater. The "net new registrations" here is defined as the number of new registrations minus the number of domains deleted in the Add Grace Period.

Google said in 2008 that their AdSense program would now look for domain names that are repeatedly registered and dropped. These domains will automatically be dropped from the AdSense program.

Starting in April 2009, many top level domains (TLDs) began transitioning from the $0.18 fee for excess domains deleted to implementing a policy resulting in a fee equal to registering the domain.

In August 2009, ICANN reported that prior to implementing excess domain deletion charges, the peak month for domain tastings was over 15 million domain names. After the $0.20 fee was implemented, tastings dropped to around 2 million domain names per month. As a result of the further increase in charges for excess domain deletions, implemented starting April 2009, the number of domain tastings dropped to below 60 thousand per month. However, these statistics only represent reports from the generic TLDs (gTLD); ICANN does not set policy for the country code TLDs (ccTLD).

== Related practices ==
=== Reverse domain tasting ===
A number of registrars routinely change a domain's name servers to those of their own, or a parking service, when a domain has gone past its expiration or renewal date. Domains continue to resolve for up to 30 days or more after their registration and redemption grace period have expired. The advantage of this "reverse tasting" is that the registrars or parking services can determine which domains have traffic before they are deleted, and hence maintain a list of domains that they might re-register (or even transfer) after the deletion date, as part of drop catch services.

=== Domain kiting ===
Domain kiting is the process of deleting a domain name during the five-day grace period and immediately re-registering it for another five-day period. This process is repeated any number of times with the end result of having the domain registered without having to pay for it.

=== Domain name front running ===
In January 2008, Network Solutions was accused of this practice when the company began reserving all domain names searched on their website for five days, a practice known as domain name front running.

=== Domain tasting used for spam ===
Domain tasting has been used for the purposes of spam. The limited lifetime of the tasted domain allows the spammer to effectively send spam using a disposable domain name.

== See also ==
- Cybersquatting
- Domain drop catching
- Domain name front running
