= Domain drop catching =

Registering a domain name immediately after expiry of the previous registration

Domain drop catching, also known as domain sniping, is the practice of registering a domain name once registration has lapsed, immediately after expiry.

== Background ==
When a domain is first registered, the customer is usually given the option of registering the domain for one year or longer, with automatic renewal as a possible option. Although some domain registrars often make multiple attempts to notify a registrant of a domain name's impending expiration, a failure on the part of the original registrant to provide the registrar with accurate contact information makes an unintended registration lapse possible. Practices also vary, and registrars are not required to notify customers of impending expiration. Unless the original registrant holds a trademark or other legal entitlement to the name, they are often left without any form of recourse in getting their domain name back. It is incumbent on registrants to be proactive in managing their name registrations and to be good stewards of their domain names. By law there are no perpetual rights to domain names after payment of registration fees lapses, aside from trademark rights granted by common law or statute.

=== Redemption Grace Period (RGP) ===
The Redemption Grace Period is an addition to ICANN's Registrar Accreditation Agreement (RAA) which allows a registrant to reclaim their domain name for a number of days after it has expired. This length of time varies by TLD, and is usually around 30 to 90 days. Prior to the implementation of the RGP by ICANN, individuals could easily engage in domain sniping to extort money from the original registrant to buy their domain name back.

After the period between the domain's expiry date and the beginning of the RGP, the domain's status changes to "redemption period" during which an owner may be required to pay a fee (typically around US$100) to re-activate and re-register the domain. ICANN's RAA requires registrars to delete domain registrations once a second notice has been given and the RGP has elapsed. At the end of the "pending delete" phase of 5 days, the domain will be dropped from the ICANN database.

=== Drop catch services ===
For particularly popular domain names, there are often multiple parties anticipating the expiration. Competition for expiring domain names has since become a purview of drop catching services. These services offer to dedicate their servers to securing a domain name upon its availability, usually at an auction price. Individuals with their limited resources find it difficult to compete with these drop catching firms for highly desirable domain names.

Retail registrars such as GoDaddy or eNom retain names for auction through services such as TDNAM or Snapnames through a practice known as domain warehousing. Drop catch services are performed by both ICANN-accredited registrars and non-accredited registrars.

=== Domain futures / options or back-orders ===
Some registry operators (for example dot-РФ, dot-PL, dot-RU, dot-ST, dot-TM) offer a service by which a back-order (also sometimes known as a "domain future" or "domain option") can be placed on a domain name.

If a domain name is due to return to the open market, then the owner of the back-order will be given the first opportunity to acquire the domain name before the name is deleted and is open to a free-for-all. In this way back-orders will usually take precedence over drop-catch.

There may be a fee for the back-order itself, often only one back-order can be placed per domain name and a further purchase or renewal fee may be applicable if the back-order succeeds.

Back-Orders typically expire in the same way domain names do, so are purchased for a specific number of years.

Different operators have different rules. In some cases back-orders can only be placed at certain times, for example after the domain name has expired, but before it has returned to the open market (see Redemption Grace Period).

A back-order is often more like an "option" than a "future" as there is often no obligation for the new registrant to take the name, even after it has been handed to the owner of the back-order. For example, some registries give the new registrant 30 days to purchase a renewal on the name before it is once again returned to the open market (or any new back-order registrant).

== See also ==
- Domain hijacking
- Domain tasting
- Domain warehousing
- Drop registrar
