= Domain parking =

Reservation of a web domain to prevent cybersquatting or for future use

Domain (TLD) parking is the registration of an Internet domain name without that domain being associated with any services such as e-mail or a website. This may have been done with a view to reserving the domain name for future development, and to protect against the possibility of cybersquatting. Since the domain name registrar will have set name servers for the domain, the registrar or reseller potentially has use of the domain rather than the final registrant.

Domain parking can be classified as monetized and non-monetized. In the former, advertisements are shown to visitors and the domain is "monetized". In the latter, an "Under Construction" or a "Coming Soon" message may or may not be put up on the domain by the registrar or reseller. This is a single-page website that people see when they type the domain name or follow a link in a web browser. Domain names can be parked before a web site is ready for launching.

== Parked domain monetization ==
The term "domain parking" may also refer to an advertising practice, more precisely called "parked domain monetization", used primarily by domain name registrars and internet advertising publishers to monetize type-in traffic visiting a parked, "under-developed", or unused domain name. The domain name will usually resolve to a web page containing advertising listings and links. These links will be targeted to the predicted interests of the visitor and may change dynamically based on the results that visitors click on. Usually the domain holder is paid based on how many links have been visited (e.g. pay per click) and on how beneficial those visits have been. The keywords for any given domain name provide clues as to the intent of the visitor before arriving.

Another use of domain parking is to be a placeholder for an existing web site. The domain holder might also choose to redirect a domain to another website it has registered, either through URL redirection, domain cloaking or by pointing it as an alias of the main domain, although if this is done by the ultimate registrant, the domain is then in use, rather than parked.

Expired domains that were formerly websites are also sought after for parked domain monetization. A domain that was used as a website and is allowed to expire will still maintain most of its prior inbound links. These types of domains usually attract their largest amount of visitor traffic initially after being claimed from the domain drop lists. As website operators and search engines begin to remove the former inbound links, the traffic to the parked domain will begin to decline. The process of re-registering expired names is known as dropcatching and various domain name registries have differing views on it.

On domains with a 'one-click' implementation, a click on a keyword is not necessary to generate ad revenue. The ads are targeted based on the domain name. Domains with 'two-click' implementations require a click on a keyword or a keyword search to generate ad revenue.

There are several companies that actively cater to domain name holders and act as middlemen to serve advertisements on parking pages. The parking pages are propagated automatically on a domain holder's web property when they either change the name servers or forward the URL.
