= .be =

Top-level Internet domain for Belgium

- Introduced: 5 August 1988 (added to root zone)
- TLD type: Country code top-level domain
- Status: Active
- Registry: DNS Belgium
- Sponsor: DNS Belgium
- Intended use: Entities connected with Belgium
- Actual use: Very popular in Belgium; also used by YouTube for URL shortening
- Registered domains: 1,746,459 (2022-12-10)
- Registration restrictions: None
- Structure: Names can be registered directly at second level; some third-level names under categories such as ac.be for academic institutions also exist
- Documents: Documents
- Dispute policies: ADR
- DNSSEC: Yes
- Registry website: www.dnsbelgium.be

.be is the Internet country code top-level domain (ccTLD) for Belgium. In November 2022, there were 1,746,459 registered domain names using it.

== History ==
The domain became active in 1989 and was administrated by Pierre Verbaeten of the Katholieke Universiteit Leuven. In 2000, the control of the TLD was transferred to DNS Belgium.

It was announced in November 2005 that the initial registration of domains would be free until the beginning of 2006, though with some limits on the number any individual was allowed to register.

This was remarkably popular, with some 17,000 registrations coming in on the first day of the promotion.

== Registration ==
Any .be registration has to be ordered via a registered agent. Domain names are registered directly at second level.

BELNET, the federal internet provider for scientific institutions, manages the .ac.be subdomain reserved for academic entities, with a policy of allowing only one active .ac.be domain per institution.

Because of this, most universities abandoned their .ac.be SLD as primary domain. This is why ucl.ac.be shifted to uclouvain.be, fundp.ac.be to unamur.be, ulg.ac.be to uliege.be or fusl.ac.be to usaintlouis.be when changing names.

The University of Mons-Hainaut, by merging with the Faculté polytechnique de Mons (fpms.ac.be) into a new legal entity called the University of Mons, could change its domain from umh.ac.be to umons.ac.be.

=== Regional variants ===
The Flemish separatist party Vlaams Belang introduced a draft resolution in the Parliament of the region of Flanders demanding the creation of a Flemish top level domain .vl (for Vlaanderen, Flanders in Flemish).

However, this resolution failed to receive support of the region's other parties. Only recognized UN member states are eligible for a two-letter domain extension.

In October 2008, the Flemish government expressed its intention to obtain a three-letter domain code for Flanders, like .vla, .vln or .fla. In 2014, .vlaanderen and .brussels were added, also administered by DNSBelgium.

The domain has also been in use as a logo for the federal government since 2003.

== Other uses ==
YouTube uses the domain hack youtu.be for their URL shortening service.
