= Type-in traffic =

Web traffic direct to a domain

Type-in traffic is a term that historically describes visitors finding a website by directly entering a URL in a web browser's address bar. This type of direct navigation includes users both navigating to known sites and discovering unfamiliar sites by manually constructing URLs out of search terms, removing invalid characters like spaces (by omission or hyphen substitution), and appending a top-level domain such as .com. It contrasts with other types of web traffic attributable to hyperlinks from web pages, browser bookmarks, or search results provided by search engines.

With the emergence of phishing websites (also called Spoofed URL), advertisement linked to malicious websites and improper filtering, the use of previously saved URLs is one way to avoid navigation to suspicious websites. The URL of a website may be saved as a bookmark within a browser. Alternatively the URL may be saved manually by the end-user as a short-cut to the computer desktop or file system. Finally, the URL may be manually copied and saved to local text file or document and subsequently copied and pasted into the Web browser.

== History ==
Prior to 2002 most web browsers resolved type-in search strings via DNS to the .com top-level domain; thus entering 'mysearchterm' in the web browser's address bar would typically lead the user to http://mysearchterm.com/. This behavior changed as browsers evolved based on the 'default search engine' setting in the web browser's properties. Thus entering 'mysearchterm' in the address bar would now lead to an error page, as the computer is looking http://mysearchterm/ or to results from a search engine if a default is set. Much of Microsoft's Bing (formerly as MSN then Windows Live Search) high usage rank historically resulted from the error page traffic delivered via their dominant Internet Explorer browser. A significant percentage of Google's traffic historically originated from redirects via the Firefox and Google Chrome browsers and from the Google toolbar, all of which took over type-in traffic search strings to the browser address bar.

- In November 2004 Marchex acquired the generic domain name portfolio of Name Development Ltd., a little-known British Virgin Islands company, for 164 million dollars, predominantly for its 100,000+ domain name portfolio generating 17 million type-in traffic visitors each month.
- In 2005, Highland Capital and Summit Partners, two venture capital firms, acquired a controlling interest in BuyDomains, paying an undisclosed sum for its domain name portfolio.
- In August 2005, industry trade journals such as dnjournal, dnforum and domainstate reported that sale volumes and prices of existing generic domain-names were rising rapidly as a result of type-in traffic monetization opportunities. Small webmasters could buy a domain name with type-in traffic and utilize Google's AdSense product, or any of several traffic aggregators to display relevant advertising to the trickle of visitors coming to their domain names. Many small publishers generated thousands of dollars each month in revenue with very little effort by building websites that served relevant advertising to their type-in traffic visitors.
- In April 2006 DemandMedia.com purchased the domain name registrar eNom as a tool for acquiring type-in traffic and for a portfolio of thousands of type-in traffic domain names. In July 2006 Demand Media purchased Bulkregister.com, another top ten ICANN accredited registrar.
- In May 2006 iREIT acquired Netster.com, predominantly for the thousands of generic type-in domain names contained within the broader Netster domain name portfolio.
- Google's entry into the small publisher monetization space came as a result of their purchase of Applied Semantics (oingo.com) in 2003. The drop registrar phenomenon is directly related to the value and desirability of type-in traffic domain names.
- Type-in traffic does not differentiate between trademark traffic and generic traffic as it relates to domain names. For example, the act of registering coca-cola.com for one's own commercial gain would be considered cybersquatting. However, the act of registering softdrinks.com or cola.com would likely be a defensible acquisition of a generic domain name for type-in traffic generation or resale business opportunities. Many companies began to actually buy backlinks from type-in traffic sites in an effort to capture more unique visitors from reasonably targeted networks.
