= Drop registrar =

Domain name registrar

A drop registrar is a domain name registrar who registers expiring Internet domain names immediately after they expire and are deleted by the domain name registry. A drop registrar will typically use automated software to send up to 250 simultaneous domain name registration requests in an attempt to register the domain name first. In recognition of the potential abuse of such a "domain land rush", ICANN and VeriSign limited the number of simultaneous requests to 250 since July 17, 2001.

== Major drop registrars ==
Several registrars specialize in high-volume drop-catching by operating large portfolios of ICANN-accredited registrars and highly optimized registration infrastructure. DropCatch.com is one of the most prominent examples, operating hundreds of affiliated registrar accreditations to maximize registration attempts at the moment a domain is released by the registry. Gname is another well-known drop registrar, particularly active in competitive generic TLD drops, using similar large-scale automated systems to increase capture success rates.

== See also ==
- Domain drop catching
