= Faux Cyrillic =

Using Cyrillic letters to represent Latin ones

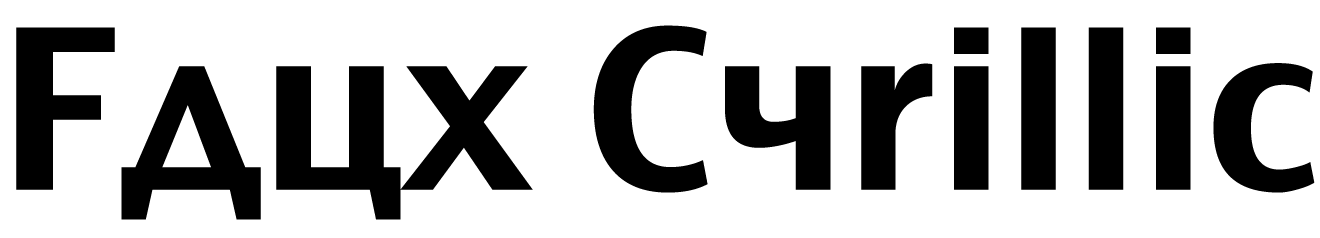
Faux Cyrillic text using Cyrillic letters to represent English-language words. The example ⟨Fдцх Счrіllіс⟩, which combines Latin and Cyrillic scripts, is transliterated as "Fdtskh Schrillis".

Faux Cyrillic, pseudo-Cyrillic (Russian: псевдокириллица, romanized: psevdokirillitsa), pseudo-Russian or faux Russian typography is the use of Cyrillic letters in Latin text, usually to evoke the Soviet Union or Russia, though it may be used in other contexts as well. It is a common Western trope used in book covers, film titles, comic book lettering, artwork for computer games, or product packaging which are set in or wish to evoke Eastern Europe, the Soviet Union, or Russia. A typeface designed to emulate Cyrillic is classed as a mimicry typeface.

Letters are substituted regardless of phonetic matching. For example, R and N in RUSSIAN may be replaced with Cyrillic Я ("ya") and И ("i") to form the faux-Cyrillic "ЯUSSIAИ" (which in Russian would be pronounced yaussiai). Other examples include the use of Ш ("sh") for W, Ц ("ts") for U, Я/Г ("ya"/"g") for R/vertically flipped L, Ф ("f") for O, Д ("d") for A, Б ("b"), Ь (soft sign), or Ъ (hard sign) for B/b, З ("z"), Э ("eh"), or Ё for E, Ч ("ch") or У ("u") for Y, backwards Б (written as Б) sometimes for D, upside-down or vertically flipped Л ("l") (Л or Л) sometimes for V. Outside the Russian alphabet, Џ (from Serbian) can act as a substitute for U, Ғ (from Turkic languages) for F, Ә (from Turkic languages, Abkhaz, Dungan, Itelmen, Kalmyk and Kurdish) or Є (from Ukrainian) for E, Ө (from Turkic, Mongolic and Uralic languages) for O, Һ (from Turkic and Mongolic languages and Kildin Sámi) for H, and Ћ (Serbian) for Th. A reversed ☭ (written as ☭) is also sometimes used for G.

This effect is usually restricted to text set in all caps, because Cyrillic letter-forms do not match well with lower case Latin letters. In Cyrillic typography, most upright lower case letters resemble smaller upper case letters, unlike the more distinctive forms of Latin-alphabet type. Cursive Cyrillic upper and lower case letters are more differentiated. Most Cyrillic letter-forms were derived from the Greek alphabet in the 9th century, but the modern forms have more closely resembled those in the Latin alphabet since Peter the Great's civil script reform of 1708.

Many versions of Tetris, including those by Atari/Tengen and Spectrum Holobyte, used faux Cyrillic to spell the name as TETЯIS (tetyais) to emphasize the game's Russian origins. The mockumentary film Borat used faux Cyrillic to stylize its title as BORДT (Vordt, in Russian the name would be spelt БОРАТ). Another example is American ammunition manufacturer Red Army Standard Ammunition, which is stylized as "RЭD АRMY STAИDARD" (Rėd army staidard). The Swedish band Avatar used faux Cyrillic to stylize their logo as ДVДTДR (dvdtdr). Those familiar with the alphabet may find the effect's use to signal exoticism or menace as ignorant or ultimately just silly. An inversion of faux Cyrillic, where Latin letters are used to render Cyrillic text, can be seen in Billy Joel's Soviet live album, Концерт whose name is often rendered in faux-Latin script as "Kohuept" rather than the correctly transliterated "Kontsert".

== Characters ==
Cyrillic letter	Latin look-alikes	Actual pronunciation
Б	B, G, S, numeral 5, numeral 6	/b/ as in boy
В	B, ß	/v/ as in vault, /w/ as in wind (Ukrainian)
Г	T, lowercase r, vertically flipped L, backwards S	/ɡ/ as in goat, [ɦ]~[ɣ] similar to hill (Belarusian, Ukrainian)
Д (alt: Δ)	A, O, lowercase g	/d/ as in door
Ж	X, *, backwards and forwards K	/ʐ/ similar to treasure
З	backwards E, numeral 3	/z/ as in zoo
И	backwards N, lowercase u	/i/ as in tree or [ɪ] as in him (Ukrainian)
Й	backwards N, backwards Ñ, backwards Ň, lowercase u	/j/ as in you
К	K	/k/ as in car
Л (alt: Ʌ)	A, N, JI	/l/ as in love or [ɫ] as in coal
Н	H	/n/ as in nose
П	N, H, lowercase n, lowercase h, upside down U	/p/ as in spot
Р	P	/r/ as in rope (trilled)
С	C	/s/ as in soup
У	lowercase Y	/u/ as in rule
Ф	I, O, Q, Ø, numeral 0	/f/ as in fawn
Х	X	/x/ as in Scottish English loch
Ц	U, vertically flipped L connected, LI	/ts/ as in cats
Ч	Y, U, numeral 4	/tɕ/ similar to check
Ш	W, rotated E, upside down M	/ʂ/ similar to shrunk
Щ	W, rotated E, vertically flipped L connected	/ɕː/ similar to wish sheep (Russian), /ʃtʃ/ as in fresh cheese (Ukrainian and Rusyn), /ʃt/ as in fish tank (Bulgarian)
Ы	bI, vertically flipped P, letter L, numeral 61	/ɨ/ similar to roses in some dialects
Ь	lowercase b, vertically flipped P	indicates the palatalization of the previous consonant, as in union as opposed to unite
Э	backwards E, backwards C, numeral 3	/ɛ/ as in echo
Ю	IO, I-O, numeral 10 letter G	/ju/ as in you
Я	backwards R	/ja/ as in yard

The letters А, В, Е, Ѕ*, І*, Ј*, К, М, Н, О, Р, С, Т, Ү*, У, Ғ*, Ѵ*, and Х (*used in other Cyrillic alphabets or from Church Slavonic) are strongly homoglyphic or related to Latin letters, depending on intended sound values to the point that their substitution may not be noticed, unlike those listed above.

== See also ==
- Homoglyph
- IDN homograph attack
- Foreign branding
- Heavy metal umlaut for a similar practice in the field of heavy metal
- Leet for a similar manner of replacing Latin letters with other glyphs that resemble them
  - Gyaru-moji, Yaminjeongeum, and the Martian language
- Mimicry/ethnic typefaces
- Samples of simulation typefaces
- Transformation of text
- UL Recognized Mark (UR)
- Faux Hebrew
- Wonton font, a similar font style that represents East Asian languages
- Pseudolocalization, a technique of testing software's ability to be localized, using diacritical marks, faux Cyrillic and other lookalikes of (usually) English characters to simulate other languages for purposes of string handling
