= Transcription error =

Data entry error

Examples of transcription error

Input : Joseph Miscat
Instead of : Joseph Muscat

Input : 23 Auguat
Instead of : 23 August

Input : Jishua
Instead of : Joshua

A transcription error is a specific type of data entry error that is commonly made by human operators or by optical character recognition (OCR) programs. Human transcription errors are commonly the result of typographical mistakes; putting one's fingers in the wrong place while touch typing is the easiest way to make this error. Electronic transcription errors occur when the scan of some printed matter is compromised or in an unusual font – for example, if the paper is crumpled, or the ink is smudged, the OCR may make transcription errors when reading.

== Transposition error ==
Examples of transposition errors

Input : Gergory
Instead of : Gregory

Input : 23 Auguts
Instead of : 23 August

Input : NO REGERTS
Instead of : NO REGRETS

"Transposition error" may be confused with "transcription error", but they do not mean the same thing. As the name suggests, transposition errors occur when characters have "transposed"—that is, they have switched places. This often occurs in the course of transcription; thus a transposition error is a special case of a transcription error. Transposition errors are almost always human in origin. The most common way for characters to be transposed is when a user is touch typing at a speed that makes them input a later character before an earlier one; or simply fails to keep the correct order in their internal memory while transcribing the text.

== Solving transcription and transposition errors ==
Transcription and transposition errors are found everywhere, even in professional articles in newspapers or books. They can be missed by editors quite easily, just as they can be created quite easily. The most obvious cure for the errors is for the user to watch the screen when they type, and to proofread. If the entry is occurring in data capture forms, databases or subscription forms, the designer of the forms should use input masks or validation rules.

Transcription and transposition errors may also occur in syntax when computer programming or programming, within variable declarations or coding parameters. This should be checked by proofreading; some syntax errors may also be picked up by the program the author is using to write the code. Common desktop publishing and word processing applications use spell checkers and grammar checkers, which may pick up on some transcription/transposition errors; however, these tools cannot catch all errors, as some errors form new words which are grammatically correct. For instance, if the user wished to write "The fog was dense", but instead put "The dog was dense", a grammar and spell checker would not notify the user because both phrases are grammatically correct, as is the spelling of the word "dog". Unfortunately, this situation is likely to get worse before it gets better, as workload for users and workers using manual direct data entry (DDE) devices increases.

Double entry (or more) may also be leveraged to minimize transcription or transposition error, but at the cost of a reduced number of entries per unit time.

Mathematical transposition errors are easily identifiable. Add up the numbers that make up the difference and the resultant number will always be evenly divisible by nine. For example, (72-27)/9 = 5.

== Auditing transcription errors in medical research databases ==
Double data entry is considered to be the goldstandard approach, although even when ruled important, it is described emotionally as "laborious". However, as double-entry needs to be carried out by two separate data entry officers, the expenses associated with double data entry are substantial. Moreover, in some institutions this may not be possible. Therefore, M. Khushi et al. suggests another semi-automatic technique called 'eAuditor'. Using an audit protocol tool, it was identified that human entry errors range from 0.01% when entering donors' clinical follow-up details, to 0.53% when entering pathological details, highlighting the importance of an audit protocol tool in a medical research database.

== Transcription errors in DNA replication ==
In biology, transcription errors may occur in the process of DNA replication, resulting in genetic mutations.

== See also ==
- Typographical error
- IDN homograph attack
- sic
- Yaminjeongeum, South Korean practice of intentionally misreading words for amusement.
