= Laundry Blues =

Laundry Blues may refer to:

- "Laundry Blues" (Open All Hours), an episode of Open All Hours
- Laundry Blues (film), a 1930 animated short film

== See also ==
- "Chinese Laundry Blues", a 1932 comic song associated with George Formby
