= Doppelganger domain =

Form of domain name hijack

A doppelganger domain is a domain that is spelled identically to a legitimate fully qualified domain name (FQDN) but missing the dot between host/subdomain and domain, to be used for malicious purposes.

Typosquatting's traditional attack vector is through the web to distribute malware or harvest credentials. Other vectors include email and remote access services such as Secure Shell (SSH), Remote Desktop Protocol (RDP), and Virtual Private Networks (VPN). In a whitepaper by Godai Group on doppelganger domains, they demonstrated that numerous emails can be harvested without anyone noticing.

For example, for email address "ktrout@finance.corpudyne.com", the doppelganger domain would be "financecorpudyne.com"; hence, an email accidentally addressed to "ktrout@financecorpudyne.com" (i.e. with the dot between "finance" and "corpudyne" having accidentally been omitted) would go to the doppelganger domain rather than to the legitimate user.

== See also ==
- Anticybersquatting Consumer Protection Act (ACPA) – 1999 American law
- Domain Name System (DNS) – System to identify resources on a network
- Phishing – Form of social engineering
- Spoofed URL – Website that poses as another website, often allowing a malicious computer attack
- Uniform Domain-Name Dispute-Resolution Policy (UDRP) – Process of dispute resolution
