= Faux Hebrew =

Mimicry typeface

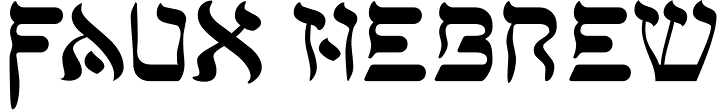
"Faux Hebrew" written in a Faux Hebrew font; note the use of actual Hebrew letters alef א (for X) and shin ש (for W).

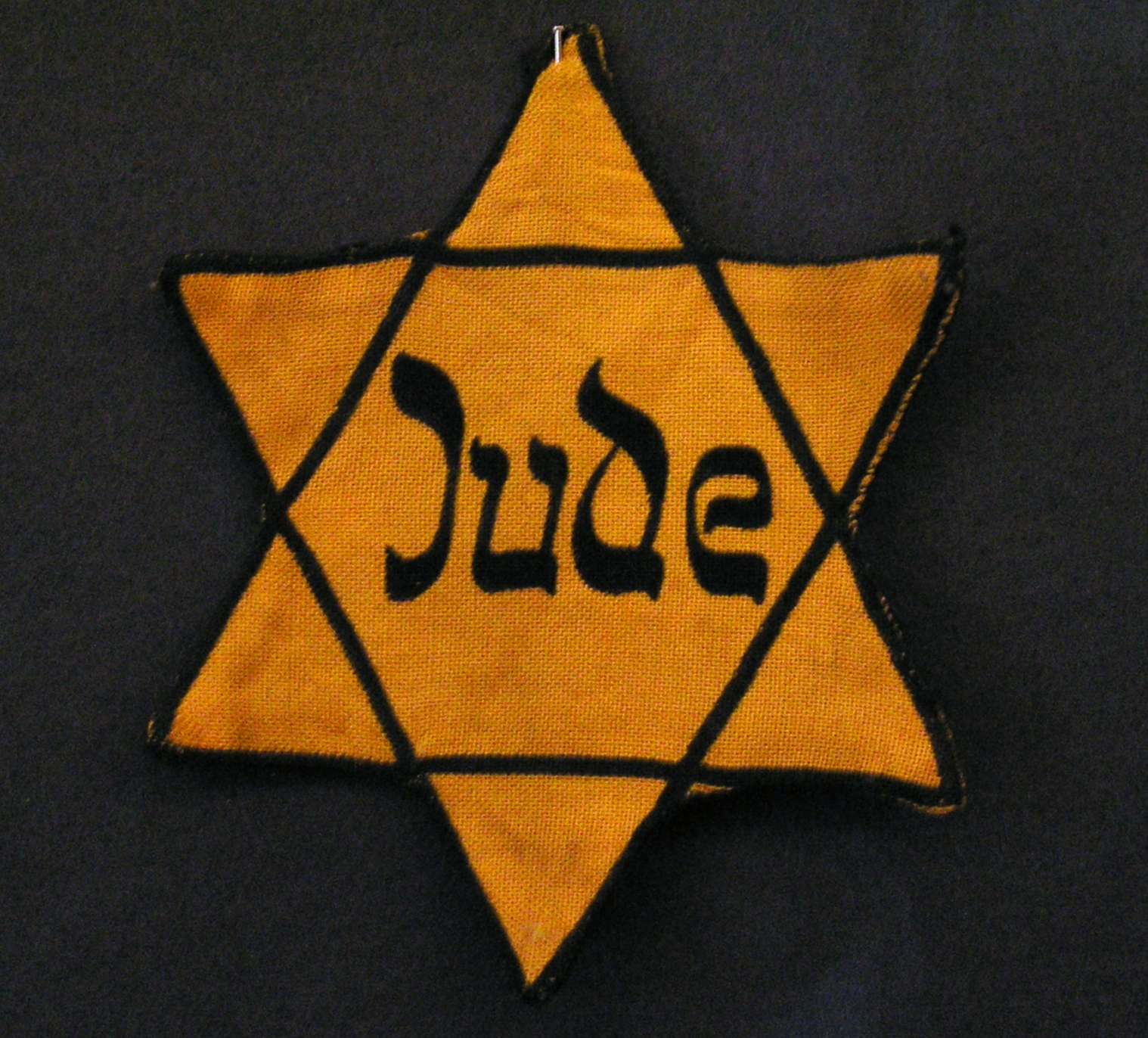
Faux Hebrew on a Yellow badge

Faux Hebrew is a Latin script typeface that mimics the calligraphic curves and large serif of Hebrew characters. The style is used for decorative purposes, such as in artwork, foreign branding advertisements, and antisemitic propaganda, often to evoke themes of Jewishness or represent the State of Israel.

In some cases, actual Hebrew letters are substituted for Latin letters. For example, the alef א is used for X, shin ש is used for W, and samekh ס is used for O.

The first Faux Hebrew typeface was Papirtis Maseltov, created in 1963 by Charles Papirtis.

== Criticism ==
Like other typefaces that mimic non-Latin characters, the use of Faux Hebrew has been a subject of criticism. Some view the use of Faux Hebrew script as appropriating Jewish culture without understanding its historical or religious significance.

Jessica Helfand in a 2007 Design Observer essay compared using Faux Hebrew or similar fonts in inappropriate scenarios to Don Imus's comments on the Rutgers women's basketball team, asking "what's the difference between a celebrity making an unforgivable racist remark and a typographer making a font that clumsily perpetuates a cultural stereotype?". However, she clarified that the context in which a typeface is used is important, saying: "And yes, it's all about appropriateness: fine to use Fake Hebrew for a deli; not so fine on, say, a yellow armband." Professor Sarah Bunin Benor rejected a book cover design that used Faux Hebrew stating that "it's just not appropriate because it has this mocking or comedic effect".

== See also ==
- Wonton font
- Faux Cyrillic
