= Explicit semantic analysis =

In natural language processing and information retrieval, explicit semantic analysis (ESA) is a vectoral representation of text (individual words or entire documents) that uses a document corpus as a knowledge base. Specifically, in ESA, a word is represented as a column vector in the tf–idf matrix of the text corpus and a document (string of words) is represented as the centroid of the vectors representing its words. Typically, the text corpus is English Wikipedia, though other corpora including the Open Directory Project have been used.

ESA was designed by Evgeniy Gabrilovich and Shaul Markovitch as a means of improving text categorization and has been used by this pair of researchers to compute what they refer to as "semantic relatedness" by means of cosine similarity between the aforementioned vectors, collectively interpreted as a space of "concepts explicitly defined and described by humans", where Wikipedia articles (or ODP entries, or otherwise titles of documents in the knowledge base corpus) are equated with concepts. The name "explicit semantic analysis" contrasts with latent semantic analysis (LSA), because the use of a knowledge base makes it possible to assign human-readable labels to the concepts that make up the vector space.

== Model ==
To perform the basic variant of ESA, one starts with a collection of texts, say, all Wikipedia articles; let the number of documents in the collection be N. These are all turned into "bags of words", i.e., term frequency histograms, stored in an inverted index. Using this inverted index, one can find for any word the set of Wikipedia articles containing this word; in the vocabulary of Egozi, Markovitch and Gabrilovitch, "each word appearing in the Wikipedia corpus can be seen as triggering each of the concepts it points to in the inverted index."

The output of the inverted index for a single word query is a list of indexed documents (Wikipedia articles), each given a score depending on how often the word in question occurred in them (weighted by the total number of words in the document). Mathematically, this list is an N-dimensional vector of word-document scores, where a document not containing the query word has score zero. To compute the relatedness of two words, one compares the vectors (say u and v) by computing the cosine similarity,

$$\mathsf{sim}(\mathbf{u}, \mathbf{v})
= \frac{\mathbf{u} \cdot \mathbf{v}}{\|\mathbf{u}\| \|\mathbf{v}\|}
= \frac{\sum_{i=1}^N u_i v_i}{\sqrt{\sum_{i=1}^N u_i^2}\sqrt{\sum_{i=1}^N v_i^2}}$$

and this gives a numeric estimate of the semantic relatedness of the words. The scheme is extended from single words to multi-word texts by simply summing the vectors of all words in the text.

== Analysis ==
ESA, as originally posited by Gabrilovich and Markovitch, operates under the assumption that the knowledge base contains topically orthogonal concepts. However, it was later shown by Anderka and Stein that ESA also improves the performance of information retrieval systems when it is based not on Wikipedia, but on the Reuters corpus of newswire articles, which does not satisfy the orthogonality property; in their experiments, Anderka and Stein used newswire stories as "concepts". To explain this observation, links have been shown between ESA and the generalized vector space model. Gabrilovich and Markovitch replied to Anderka and Stein by pointing out that their experimental result was achieved using "a single application of ESA (text similarity)" and "just a single, extremely small and homogenous test collection of 50 news documents".

== Applications ==
=== Word relatedness ===
ESA is considered by its authors a measure of semantic relatedness (as opposed to semantic similarity). On datasets used to benchmark relatedness of words, ESA outperforms other algorithms, including WordNet semantic similarity measures and skip-gram Neural Network Language Model (Word2vec).

=== Document relatedness ===
ESA is used in commercial software packages for computing relatedness of documents. Domain-specific restrictions on the ESA model are sometimes used to provide more robust document matching.

== Extensions ==
Cross-language explicit semantic analysis (CL-ESA) is a multilingual generalization of ESA. CL-ESA exploits a document-aligned multilingual reference collection (e.g., again, Wikipedia) to represent a document as a language-independent concept vector. The relatedness of two documents in different languages is assessed by the cosine similarity between the corresponding vector representations.

== See also ==
- Topic model
