= .cm =

Top-level Internet domain for Cameroon

- Logo used by Netcom, one of the official .cm domain registrars
- Introduced: 29 April 1995
- TLD type: Country code top-level domain
- Status: Active
- Registry: Agence Nationale des Technologies de l'Information et de la Communication
- Sponsor: Ministry of Posts and Telecommunications of Cameroon
- Intended use: Entities connected with Cameroon
- Actual use: Some use in Cameroon; sometimes used in typosquatting due to misspellings of .com domains
- Registration restrictions: None; Some labels reserved for government or educational agencies
- Structure: Registrations are made directly at the second level or at the third level beneath various second level domains
- Documents: '.cm' policy
- Dispute policies: Dispute management policy
- DNSSEC: Yes
- Registry website: ANTIC nic.cm

.cm is the country code top-level domain (ccTLD) for the Republic of Cameroon.

== History ==
In August 2006, it was reported that the .cm registry had set up a wildcard DNS record, so that all unregistered domains in this top-level domain go to a parking page with paid search links. This was likely intended to take advantage of typographical errors by users attempting to reach .com web sites.

Auctions of .cm domains have been as high as $81,000 in 2009 for what pitchmen have termed "prime real estate". However, some bloggers have noted that nothing of any real value was actually put up for auction, despite the price war. Namejet.com, the official auction site for the .CM domain registrar Netcom.cm, sold over $500,000 in .cm domain names the first day and over $2 million in the first week.

== Reputation ==
In a report published in December 2009 by McAfee, "Mapping the Mal Web - The world's riskiest domain", .cm was reportedly the riskiest domain in the world, with 36.7% of the sites posing a security risk to PCs. It is widely assumed that malicious domain programmers rely on inadvertent misspellings of well-trafficked websites ending in ".com" to lure unsuspecting users to their domains.

The .cm top-level domain is also used for domain name hacks by legitimate organizations, such as the CyanogenMod project, which used get.cm as an easily remembered URL shortener for distributing versions of its software, and The Hill, which uses hill.cm as a URL shortener when linking to its articles on social media.
