= Oriental riff =

Musical riff or phrase

The Oriental riff
A sound clip of the Oriental riff

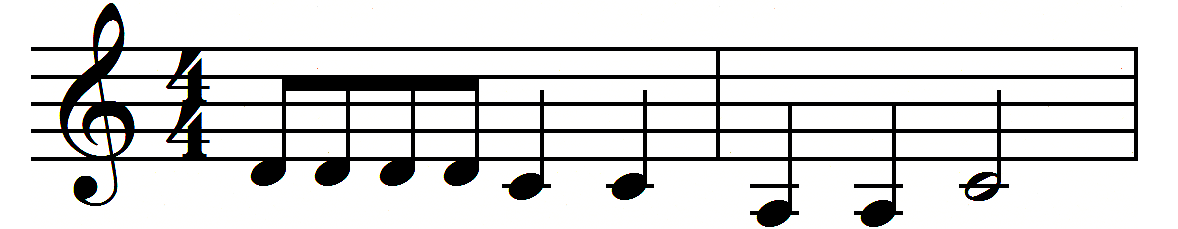
Simple melody of the Oriental riff Play

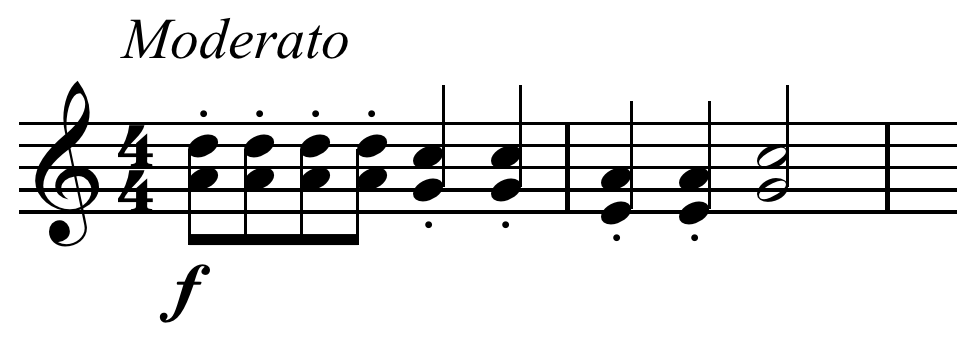
Oriental riff, doubled at the fourth Play

The Oriental riff, also known as the East Asian riff and the Chinaman lick, is a musical riff or phrase that has often been used in Western culture as a trope to represent the setting or people of East or Southeast Asia. The riff is sometimes accompanied by the sound of a gong at the start.

== History ==
The Oriental riff is a Western creation. The first known example of a precursor, showing similar rhythm if not yet melody, is the "Aladdin Quick Step", composed around 1847 and used in an Aladdin stage show named The Grand Chinese Spectacle of Aladdin or The Wonderful Lamp. Later related tunes included "Mama's China Twins (Oriental Lullaby)" from 1900. In the 1930s, a couple of cartoons used a version of the tune specifically to accompany animated stereotypes of East Asians.

The notes used in the riff are part of a pentatonic scale and often harmonized with parallel open fourths, which makes the riff sound like East Asian music to casual Western listeners. Ravel's use of these devices in his opera L'Enfant et les sortilèges has been identified as one example of how Western composers employed pentatonic scales and parallel fourths to signify chinoiserie, or East Asian character, through the riff.

== Uses ==
The Oriental riff and interpretations of it have been included as part of numerous musical works in Western music. Examples of its use include Poetic Tone Pictures (Poetické nálady) (1889) by Antonín Dvořák, "Limehouse Blues" by Carl Ambrose and his Orchestra (1935), "Kung Fu Fighting" by Carl Douglas (1974), "Kung Fu Is Back Again" by Roberta Kelly, "Japanese Boy" by Aneka (1981), "Turning Japanese" by the Vapors (1980), "Chinese Laundry Blues" by George Formby (1932), and "A Passage to Bangkok" (1976) by Rush.

== See also ==
- Arabian riff
- Orientalism
- Tarantella Napoletana, representing Italy
- Stereotypes of East Asians
- Wonton font
