= Input mask =

String expression that constrains user input

In computer programming, an input mask refers to a string expression, defined by a developer, that constrains user input. It can be said to be a template, or set format that entered data must conform to, ensuring data integrity by preventing transcription errors. The syntax of this string expression differs between implementations, but the fundamental input types are all supported. The requirement specified by an input mask (for example, a date format) can also be enforced as an output mask (for example, governing how output will be presented to the user when several stylings are viable options).

Some frequent uses of input masks include entry of telephone numbers, ZIP or postal codes, times and dates.

e.g. When entering into a text box a phone number on a data capture form, in the format "(111) 111 1111" the area code brackets, the space between the number and the area code will automatically be placed in.

Generally speaking, an input mask is a user-generated set of rules; e.g., a maximum of 45 characters. This kind of string is useful in finding reports and healthcare files.

An example would be: LL00 00L – this in detail shows what should be included.
