= Veterans Memorial Park (Auburn, New York) =

Park in Auburn, New York

- Interactive map of Veterans Memorial Park
- Type: Memorial park
- Location: Genesee Street, Auburn, New York
- Coordinates: 42°55′45″N 76°34′14″W

Veterans Memorial Park is a park in Auburn, New York. Its purpose is to honor all veterans from Cayuga County that have served in the United States military from the Revolutionary war through current deployments.

The committee to organize the plans and raise the money to build the park was made up of seven veterans from the Korean War.

Ground was broken on November 11, 2007. On April 3, 2008, the steel arch that was designed by Auburn High School students was put in at the park entrance. Throughout the park, pavers are engraved with the names of service members. Memorial benches are also used.

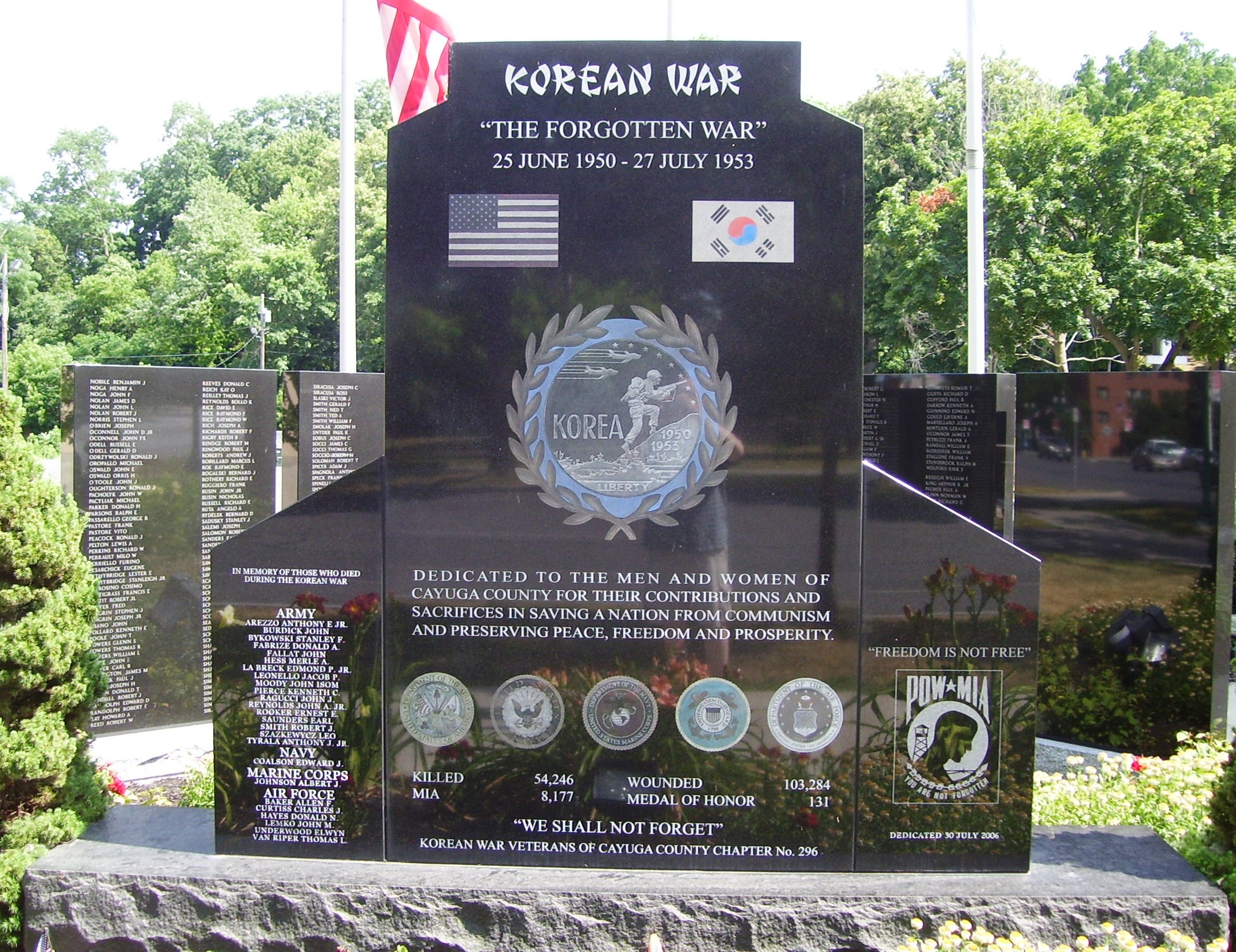
The Korean War Memorial which uses a "wonton font" to convey a sense of Orientalism.

The walkway that leads to the center of the park is made of paving stones. Some of the stones are engraved with names of service members. At the center of the park is a platform used to honor their service.
