= Mousetrapping =

Digital marketing tool

Mousetrapping is a technique that prevents users from exiting a website through standard means. It is frequently used by malicious websites, and is often seen on tech support scam sites.

Mousetrapping can be executed through various means. A website may launch an endless series of pop-up ads or redirects; it may re-launch the website in a window that cannot be easily closed. Sometimes these windows run like stand-alone applications and cause the taskbar and browser menu to become inaccessible. Some websites also employ browser hijackers to reset the user's homepage.

== Legality ==
The Federal Trade Commission has brought suits against mousetrappers, charging that the practice is a deceptive and unfair competitive practice, in violation of section 5 of the FTC Act. Typically, mousetrappers register URLs with misspelled names of celebrities (e.g. BrittnaySpears.com) or companies (e.g. BettyCroker.com and WallStreetJournel.com). Thus, if someone seeking the BettyCrocker website typed BettyCroker, the user would become ensnared in the mousetrapper's system. Once the viewer is at the site, a JavaScript or a click induced by, as one example, promises of free samples, redirects the viewer to a URL and regular site of the mousetrapper's client-advertiser, who (the FTC said in the Zuccarini case) pays 10 to 25 cents for capturing and redirecting each potential customer. An FTC press release explaining why the agency opposes mousetrapping states:

Schemes that capture consumers and hold them at sites against their will while exposing Internet users, including children, to solicitations for gambling, psychics, lotteries, and pornography must be stopped.

— Timothy J. Muris, Chairman of the FTC

== See also ==
- Phishing
- Typosquatting
- Clickjacking
- Drive-by download
