= National Agency for Information and Communication Technology =

National Agency for Information and Communication Technologies (ANTIC) (French: Agence Nationale des Technologies de l'Information et de la Communication) is the Cameroonian regulatory body for information and communication technology (ICT) and cybersecurity. The agency's roles include promoting the use of ICTs in public institutions, providing cybersecurity services such as security audits, and developing a legal framework to address cybercrime. It is the registrar of the .cm top-level domain and regulates domain names and IP addresses in Cameroon.

The agency investigates reports of cybersecurity incidents via its cybersecurity incident alert and response center (CIRT). It has identified thousands of fake Facebook and TikTok accounts and worked with the platforms to shut down such accounts, which often impersonate state officials and public institutions.

In 2025, ANTIC enabled DNSSEC on the .cm domain, aiming to increase DNS security in conjunction with the country's ISPs who also must enable DNSSEC validation in order for users to benefit from the upgrade. The agency targeted mid-2026 for 98% implementation of the standard.
