= Typosquatting =

Form of cybersquatting which relies on mistakes when inputting a website address

A misspelled URL could lead to a malicious website. This address is operated by the Wikimedia Foundation, but other similar domains may not be.

Typosquatting, also called URL hijacking, a sting site, a cousin domain, or a fake URL, is a form of cybersquatting which relies on mistakes such as typos made by Internet users when inputting a website address into a web browser. A user accidentally entering an incorrect website address may be led to a URL they did not intend to visit, including one owned by a cybersquatter.

The cybersquatter's URL will usually be similar to the victim's site address. The typosquatting site could be in the form of:

- A misspelling, or foreign language spelling, of the intended site
- A misspelling based on a typographical error
- A plural of a singular domain name
- A different top-level domain (e.g., .com instead of .org)
- An abuse of the Country Code Top-Level Domain (ccTLD) (.cm, .co, or .om instead of .com)

Similar abuses include:

- Combosquatting – no misspelling, but appending an arbitrary word that appears legitimate.
- Doppelganger domain – omitting a period or inserting an extra period
- Appending terms such as sucks or -suckes to a domain name

Once on the typosquatter's site, the user may be tricked into thinking that they are actually on the real site through the use of copied or similar content. Spam emails sometimes make use of typosquatting URLs to trick users into visiting malicious sites.

== Motivation ==
There are several different reasons for people buying a typosquatting domain:

- As a phishing scheme to mimic the brand's site, while intercepting passwords which the visitor enters unsuspectingly
- To install malware onto the visitors' devices
- To try to sell the typosquatting domain back to the brand owner
- To monetize the domain through advertising revenues from direct navigation misspellings of the intended domain
- To redirect the traffic to a competitor
- To redirect the traffic back to the brand itself, but through an affiliate link, thus earning commissions from the brand owner's affiliate program
- To harvest misaddressed e-mail messages mistakenly sent to the typo domain
- To express an opinion that is different from the intended website's opinion
- By legitimate site owners, to block malevolent use of the typo domain by others
- To annoy users of the intended site

== Examples ==
Many companies, including Verizon, Lufthansa, and Lego, have gained reputations for aggressively chasing down typosquatted names. Lego, for example, has spent roughly US$500,000 on taking 309 cases through UDRP proceedings.

Celebrities have also pursued their domain names. Prominent examples include basketball player Dirk Nowitzki's UDRP of DirkSwish.com and actress Eva Longoria's UDRP of EvaLongoria.org.

Goggle.com, a typosquatted version of Google.com, was the subject of a 2006 web safety promotion by McAfee, a computer security company, which depicted the significant amounts of malware installed through drive-by downloads upon accessing the site at the time, such as a rogue anti-spyware program known as SpySheriff. Later, the URL was redirected to google.com; a 2018 check revealed it to redirect users to adware pages, and a 2020 attempt to access the site through a private DNS resolver hosted by AdGuard resulted in the page being identified as malware and blocked for the user's security. By mid-2022, it had been turned into a political blog. However, as of October 2026, goggle.com is no longer operational.

In February 2026, researchers at Have I Been Squatted, working with Ctrl-Alt-Intel, reported a phishing operation called Diesel Vortex that targeted freight and logistics organizations in the United States and Europe. The campaign used lookalike domains and phishing pages impersonating logistics services, and was reported to have stolen more than 1,600 unique credentials from logistics platforms.

Another example of corporate typosquatting is yuube.com, targeting YouTube users by programming that URL to redirect to a malicious website or page that asks users to add a malware "security check extension". Similarly, www.airfrance.com has been typosquatted by www.arifrance.com, diverting users to a website peddling discount travel (although it now redirects to a warning from Air France about malware). Other examples are equifacks.com (Equifax.com), experianne.com (Experian.com), and tramsonion.com (TransUnion.com); these three typosquatted sites were registered by comedian John Oliver for his show Last Week Tonight. Over 550 typosquats related to the 2020 U.S. presidential election were detected in 2019.

The Magniber ransomware is being distributed in a typosquatting method that exploits typos made when entering domains, targeting mainly Chrome and Edge users.

A 2024 peer-reviewed study provides the first large-scale measurement of typosquatting in blockchain-based naming systems, such as Ethereum Name Service, Unstoppable Domains, and ADAHandles. The researchers observed thousands of cryptocurrency transactions mistakenly sent to squatting addresses, with targets including both popular domain names and identities linked to social media accounts.

== In United States law ==
In the United States, the 1999 Anticybersquatting Consumer Protection Act (ACPA) contains a clause (Section 3(a), amending 15 USC 1117 to include sub-section (d)(2)(B)(ii)) aimed at combatting typosquatting. Under 15 U.S.C. § 1125(d), added in 1999, the owner of a mark can bring a civil action against a person who, with a bad faith intent to profit, registers, traffics in or uses a domain name that is identical or confusingly similar to a distinctive mark.

On April 17, 2006, evangelist Jerry Falwell failed to get the U.S Supreme Court to review a decision allowing Christopher Lamparello to use www.fallwell.com. Relying on a plausible misspelling of Falwell's name, Lamparello's gripe site presents misdirected visitors with scriptural references that are intended to counter the fundamentalist preacher's scathing rebukes against homosexuality. In Lamparello v. Falwell, the high court let stand a 2005 Fourth Circuit opinion that "the use of a mark in a domain name for a gripe site criticizing the markholder does not constitute cybersquatting."

== WIPO resolution procedure ==
Under the Uniform Domain-Name Dispute-Resolution Policy (UDRP), trademark holders can file a case at the World Intellectual Property Organization (WIPO) against typosquatters (as with cybersquatters in general). The complainant has to show that the registered domain name is identical or confusingly similar to their trademark, that the registrant has no legitimate interest in the domain name, and that the domain name is being used in bad faith.

== See also ==
- Bitsquatting
- Domain Name System – System to identify resources on a network (DNS)
  - Domain name spoofing – Phishing attacks that depend on falsifying or misrepresenting an internet domain name
  - Doppelganger domain – Form of domain name hijack
  - IDN homograph attack – Visually similar letters in domain names
  - Spoofed URL – Website that poses as another website, often allowing a malicious computer attack
- Misdialed call § Toll-free numbers – Similar attacks on vanity phonewords
- Mousetrapping – Digital marketing tool
- Phishing – Form of social engineering
- Slopsquatting – Type of cybersquatting
- URL shortening – Web technique
