= Evgeniy Gabrilovich =

Israeli computer scientist

- 'יבגני גברילוביץ
- Born: Minsk, Belarus
- Education: Technion – Israel Institute of Technology
- Known for: IDN homograph attack, explicit semantic analysis
- Scientific career
- Fields: Computational Linguistics; Information retrieval
- Workplaces: Google Research; Yahoo! Research

Evgeniy Gabrilovich (Hebrew: 'יבגני גברילוביץ) is a research director at Facebook Reality Labs where he conducts research on neuromotor interfaces. Prior to that, he was a principal scientist and director at Google, specializing in information retrieval, machine learning, and computational linguistics, and an IEEE Fellow, and an ACM Fellow. In 2010, he received the Karen Spärck Jones Award from the British Computer Society Information Retrieval Specialist Group.

== Career ==
In 2002, Gabrilovich published a research paper documenting the possibility of an IDN homograph attack, with fellow researcher Alex Gontmakher. In 2005, Gabrilovich earned his Ph.D. in computer science from the Technion–Israel Institute of Technology. In his Ph.D. thesis, he developed a methodology for using large-scale repositories of world knowledge, such as Wikipedia, as a basis for the improvement of text representations.

== Selected publications ==
- "Computing Semantic Relatedness using Wikipedia-based Explicit Semantic Analysis", The 20th International Joint Conference on Artificial Intelligence (IJCAI), pp. 1606–1611, Evgeniy Gabrilovich and Shaul Markovitch, Hyderabad, India, January 2007
- "Harnessing the Expertise of 70,000 Human Editors: Knowledge-Based Feature Generation for Text Categorization", Evgeniy Gabrilovich and Shaul Markovitch, Journal of Machine Learning Research 8 (Oct), pp. 2297–2345, 2007
- "Robust Classification of Rare Queries Using Web Knowledge", The 30th Annual International ACM SIGIR Conference, Amsterdam, the Netherlands, July 2007
- "The Homograph Attack", Evgeniy Gabrilovich and Alex Gontmakher, Communications of the ACM, 45(2):128, February 2002
