= Martian language =

Unconventional representation of Chinese characters online

Martian language (Chinese: 火星文; pinyin: huǒxīng wén; lit. 'Martian script'), sometimes also called brain-disabled characters (simplified Chinese: 脑残体; traditional Chinese: 腦殘體; pinyin: nǎocán tǐ), is the nickname of unconventional representation of Chinese characters online by various methods. For example, "一個人的時候" (yīgèréndeshíhòu, "When one is alone") can be changed into "ㄧㄍ人ㄉ時候" since the word ㄍ (gē) is consonant of 個 and the word ㄉ (dē) is consonant of the word 的 in bopomofo.

== Origin ==
The etymology of the word, "Martian language", is mostly believed to come from the 2001 Hong Kong comedy Shaolin Soccer, in which Sing (Stephen Chow) tells Mui (Zhao Wei): "Go back to Mars. The Earth is so dangerous."

Martian language originated in Taiwan with the introduction of Chinese input methods and online games. It later began to catch on in mainland China when online games like Audition Online were introduced in China.

== General aspects ==
Similarly to leet, where certain Latin letters are replaced by numerals (such as "3" for "e"), Martian language replaces standard Chinese characters with nonstandard or foreign characters. Each Chinese character may be replaced with:

1. A character that is a (quasi-) homophone, either from Standard Chinese, Chinese dialects, or foreign languages.
2. A character that looks similar, such as one with a shared radical.
3. A character with identical or similar meaning.
4. Pictograph characters and Emojis.

Characters used for substitution can include not only other Chinese characters, but also Latin characters, bopomofo, hiragana, katakana, SMS language, Emoji, or other characters defined in Unicode. For example, "謝謝" ("thank you") can be replaced by 3Q, a similar sound of "thank you" in English. 的 is commonly replaced with の, as it has the same intended meaning in Japanese.

In pictograph characters, "orz" can express a deep sense of helplessness, frustration, or utmost sincerity, since it resembles the act of dogeza. Similarly, 囧 can indicate embarrassment because of its similar appearance to a human face.

Substituting characters by similar appearance may involve splitting Chinese radicals. For example, "强" (strong) can replaced with "弓虽". Substitutions can also use characters from another language or script. For example, 廠廠 can be understood as laughter since its simplified form, "厂厂", looks similar to ㄏㄏ, a common expression of laughter in Taiwan.

There is no universal way of encoding standard Chinese to the Martian language, though some substitutions are popular and have even leaked into standard and spoken language, such as 河蟹 (lit. river crab) for 和諧 (harmony), 葉佩雯 (lit. leaf jade essay, also having the format of a person's name) for 業配文 (advertorial).

== Usage ==
In the 2006 General Scholastic Ability Test of Taiwan, students were asked to interpret symbols and phrases written in "Martian language" based on contexts written in standard language. Controversies which followed forced the testing center to abandon the practice in future exams.

Martian script was popularised in mainland China around 2008, as an idiom of teenagers.

Chinese online netizens followed the trend of using Martian language since they found their posts written in the new language could more easily pass keyword filtering censorship. For example, when the censorship censored information about Ai Fen, the netizens used Martian language to deceive the censorship.

== See also ==
- Education in the Republic of China
- Faux Cyrillic
- Gibberish
- Gyaru-moji
- Heavy metal umlaut
- IDN homograph attack
- Internet slang
- Leet
- Mojibake
- Orz
- Yaminjeongeum
