= Wonton font =

Typeface mimicking Chinese brush strokes

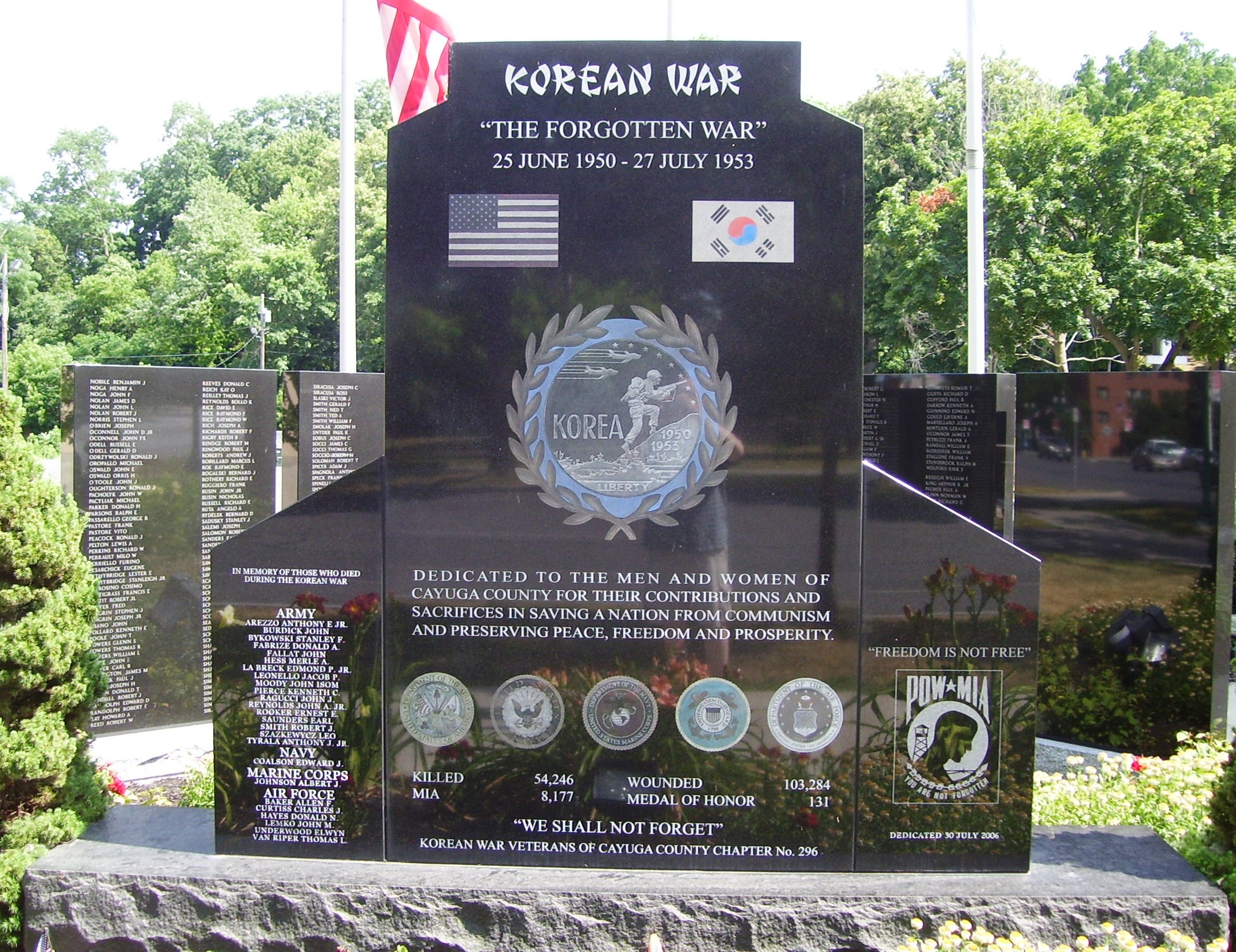
The Korean War Memorial in Veterans Memorial Park, Auburn, New York, uses wonton font to imitate brush strokes.

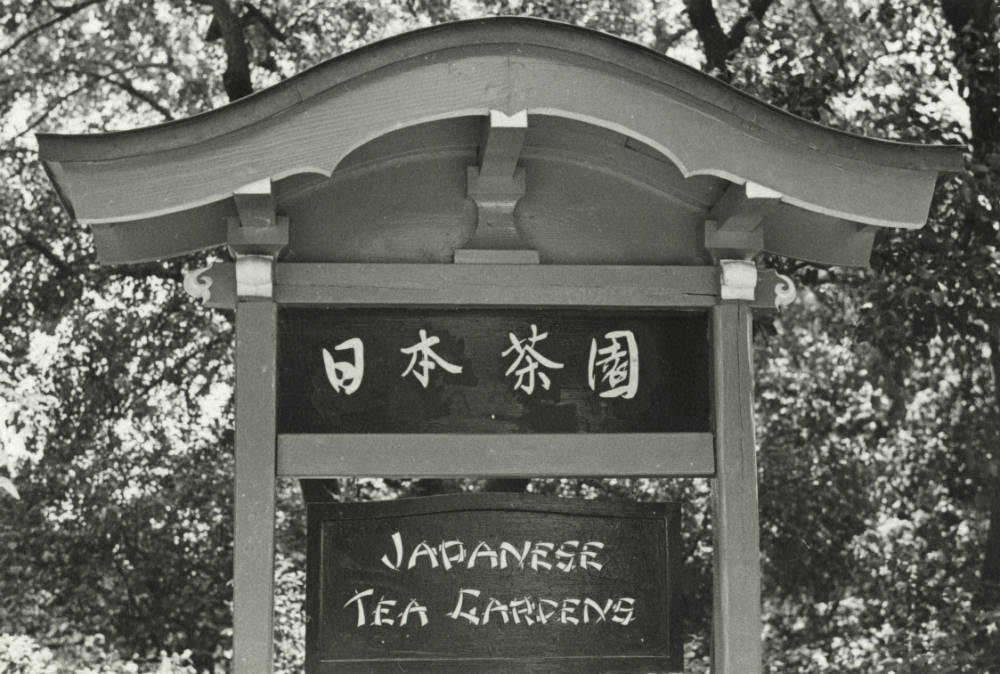
An early use of a wonton font ("Japanese Tea Gardens") in signage for the World's Columbian Exposition, 1893.

A wonton font (also known as Chinese, chopstick, chop suey, or kung-fu) is a mimicry typeface with a visual style intended to express an East Asian, or more specifically, Chinese typographic sense of aestheticism.

Styled to mimic the brush strokes used in Chinese characters, wonton fonts often convey a sense of Orientalism. In modern times, they are sometimes viewed by those in the East Asian diaspora as culturally insensitive or offensive.

== History ==
The first commercial typeface of this style was designed in 1883 by the Cleveland Type Foundry, under the name "Chinese", which became "Mandarin" in the 1950s. Many variations of this style of font have been created by typeface designers since its inception.

== Controversy ==
Some Asian Americans find wonton fonts amusing or humorous, while others find them offensive, insulting, or racist. The font's usage is often criticized when paired with caricatures that recall the Yellow Peril images of the late 19th and early 20th centuries. In 2002, the American clothing retailer Abercrombie & Fitch faced controversy when it produced a series of T-shirts with buck-toothed images and wonton font slogans. The Chicago Cubs experienced backlash from the Asian American community after a similarly offensive T-shirt was produced by an independent clothing vendor in 2008. The questionable use of such fonts was the subject of a 2012 article in the Wall Street Journal by cultural commentator and journalist Jeff Yang. In 2018, the New Jersey Republican State Committee was criticized for sending out a political mailer printed in a wonton font describing Korean-American candidate Andy Kim as "real fishy".

== See also ==
- Oriental riff
- Orientalism
- Mimicry typeface
- Faux Cyrillic
- Faux Hebrew
