= Yaminjeongeum =

South Korean Internet meme

Yaminjeongeum (Korean: 야민정음; Hanja: 野民正音) is a South Korean Internet meme which disassembles Hangul characters of a word and replaces them with others which appear similar to the correct form. For example, daejang (대장, "chief") is changed into meojang (머장), since dae (대) resembles meo (머). The name Yaminjeongeum is a blend of Hunminjeongeum and Yagael (야갤); Yagael is short for Gungnae Yagu Gallery (국내야구 갤러리; 國內野球 갤러리), the domestic baseball league section of DC Inside.

== Usage ==
There are various ways to convert a word into yaminjeongeum: just replacing its consonants or vowels, rotating it, compacting it, or even using the Latin alphabet. Some word plays are often considered to be Yaminjeongeum, though they existed before it. There is no standard of the meme, only popular forms. The following are some common examples of it:

Type of replacement	Examples					
Type of replacement	Original form			Yaminjeongeum		References
Type of replacement	Hangul	RR	Meaning	Hangul	RR	References
Replacing 근 (geun) with ㄹ (r)	박근혜	Bak Geunhye	Park Geun-hye (former president of South Korea)	박ㄹ혜	Bak Rieulhye	
Replacing ㅠ (yu) with ㅡ + ㄲ (eukk) as a stop consonant	유재석	Yu Jaeseok	Yoo Jae-suk (comedian)	윾재석	Euk Jaeseok	
Replacing 과 (gwa) with 파 (pa)	광주	Gwangju	Gwangju (major city)	팡주	Pangju	
Replacing 대 (dae) with 머 (meo), or vice versa	멍멍이	meongmeongi	Doggy	댕댕이	daengdaengi	
Replacing 대 (dae) with 머 (meo), or vice versa	대전광역시	Daejeon Gwangyeoksi	Daejeon Metropolis	머전팡역시	Meojeon Pangyeoksi	
Replacing 며 (myeo) with 띠 (tti)	명곡	myeonggok	Well-known song	띵곡	ttinggok	
Replacing 귀 (gwi) with 커 (keo)	귀엽다	gwiyeopda	Cute	커엽다	keoyeopda	
Replacing ㅗ + ㅇ (-ong) with ㅎ (h) as a stop consonant	세종대왕	Sejong Daewang	Sejong the Great	세종머앟	Sejong Meoat	
Replacing hanja 長 (장) with 튽 (teun)	김장훈(金長훈)	Gim Janghun	Kim Jang-hoon (rock singer)	숲튽훈	Sup Teunhun	
Rotating a whole phrase by 180°	폭풍눈물	pokpung nunmul	Bursting into tears	롬곡옾눞	romgok omnup	
Rotating hangul blocks by 90°	비버	Bibeo	Beaver or Bieber	또뜨, 뜨또	Ttotteu, Tteutto	
Compacting multiple syllable blocks into one	ㅗㅜㅑ(오우야)	ouya	An interjection	퍄	pya	

== Popularity ==
There is no definitive source of the origin of Yaminjeongeum. It is commonly used in public, especially by teens, and even appears on TV advertisements.

Critics state that the meme destroys Hangul and is a type of verbal violence, but supporters state that it is just a part of culture and improves the Korean language.

== See also ==
- Leet, a similar phenomenon with the Latin alphabet
- Martian language, a similar phenomenon in the Chinese language
- Gyaru-moji, a similar phenomenon in the Japanese language
- Transcription error, unintentional misreading
- IDN homograph attack, use of similar looking characters to exploit computer systems
