= Chinese Laundry Blues =

1932 British comic song

- Sheet music cover of "Chinese Laundry Blues"

Song by George Formby
- Released: 1932
- Genre: Comic song
- Songwriter(s): Jack Cotterill (or Cottrell)

"Chinese Laundry Blues" is a 1932 comic song written by Jack Cotterill (or Cottrell) and associated with the British comedian George Formby. Formby recorded it for Decca Records on 1 July 1932. The song takes place in Limehouse (a traditional Chinatown) where the owner of a laundry has fallen in love, and is no longer paying attention to his job. It subtly uses the Oriental riff.

The song featured in the 1934 comedy Boots! Boots! It became one of Formby's signature tunes, and introduced the character of "Mr Wu", who appeared in a succession of songs, such as "The Wedding Of Mr Wu", and most notably "Mr Wu's a Window Cleaner Now" which shares its subject matter with "When I'm Cleaning Windows".
