= Gyaru-moji =

Style of Japanese writing amongst urban youth

Gyaru-moji (ギャル文字, "gal's alphabet") or heta-moji (下手文字, "poor handwriting") is a style of obfuscated (cant) Japanese writing popular amongst urban Japanese youth. As the name gyaru-moji suggests (gyaru meaning "gal"), this writing system was created by and remains primarily employed by young women.

Like the English phenomenon of SMS language, it is most often used for sending cell phone text messages, but while text is used as a form of informal shorthand, a message typed in gyaru-moji usually requires more characters and effort than the same message typed in plain Japanese. Since writing in gyaru-moji requires extra effort, and due to the perception of confidentiality, sending gyaru-moji messages to a peer is seen as a sign of informality or friendship. The origin of this style is unclear but it has been proposed that magazines targeted at teenage girls first made it popular, and the phenomenon started to gain wider attention in media around 2002.

The style has been met with increasing criticism, as its use continues to expand. Reported instances of girls using the writing in school work, OLs ("office ladies") adopting the style in the workplace, and gyaru-moji being used in karaoke subtitling, are examples of this. Anthropologist Laura Miller has analyzed gyaru-moji as an example of gender resistance.

Several online guides for gyaru-moji exist, as well as one published book: Shibuya Heta Moji Fukyū Iinkai (2004).

== Formation ==
Like leet, gyaru-moji replaces characters with visually similar characters or combinations of characters. The Japanese language consists of traditional characters of Chinese origin, kanji, and two native syllabic scripts called kana: hiragana and katakana. These characters and scripts are altered to form hidden messages. Hiragana consisting of connected strokes are replaced by symbols or Greek letters: for example, su (す) may be rendered as the section symbol §. Hiragana consisting of detached elements are replaced by sequences of kana, Western letters, or symbols. For example, ho (ほ) may be typed as |ま (vertical bar and hiragana ma) or (ま (open parenthesis and ma), ke (け) may be typed as レナ (katakana re na), Iナ (capital i, na), or († (open parenthesis, dagger), and ta (た) may be typed as ナ= (katakana na, equals sign) or †こ (dagger, hiragana ko).

Katakana is frequently replaced by similar-looking kanji, such as 世 for se (セ) or 干 for chi (チ), in a reversal of the process that turned man'yōgana into kana. Kana and rōmaji may be mixed freely, even within a word, and Latin letters in rōmaji may be replaced with similar-looking Cyrillic letters, such as replacing N with И (Cyrillic I). Compound kanji are decomposed into left and right elements, which are written as individual kanji or kana. For example, the kanji 好 in 好き, meaning "like, enjoy" may be split into 女子 (the kanji for woman and child, respectively).

In addition to the basic obfuscation provided by character replacement, another technique used to disguise the content of the message is to use vocabulary and grammar that is uncharacteristic of standard usage. Combined with character substitution, this can make the meaning of the message almost unintelligible to those not "in the know". This is analogous to the use of leet's specialized grammar. However, the flexible nature of the Japanese language means that although gyaru-moji phrases sound peculiar to someone expecting formal or even commonly colloquial Japanese, they are often technically still grammatically correct.

For example, the sentence Watashi wa ima totemo ii kibun desu. (「私は今とても良い気分です。」) is "Right now I am feeling very good." in standard normal-polite Japanese. By first rewording this as 「超気持ちいい！」 or 「チョーキモチイイ！」 (Chōkimochi ii!) – which roughly translates as "(I have a) Super good feeling!" – and then converting to gyaru-moji to get 「走召 氣 持 ち ぃ ぃ !」 or 「于∋─≠モ于ｲｲ！」, the message could prove difficult for those not versed in the style to understand.

== Conversion chart ==
The original Japanese hiragana followed by romaji, and then various versions of the Japanese character in gyaru-moji. The following chart is also available in image form.

- あ a： ぁ・ァ・了
- い i： ぃ・ィ・ﾚヽ・ﾚ丶・レ）・ﾚ`・L丶・Lヽ
- う u： ぅ・ゥ・宀・ヴ
- え e： ぇ・ェ・之・工・ヱ
- お o： ぉ・ォ・才・汚
- か ka： ｶゝ・ｶ丶・ｶヽ・ｶ`・ｶゞ【が】
- き ki： (ｷ・(≠・L≠・‡
- く ku： ＜・〈・勹
- け ke： ヶ・(ﾅ・ﾚ†・ﾚﾅ・|ナ・l+・Iﾅ
- こ ko： 〓・=・]・⊃
- さ sa： 廾・±・(十・L+
- し shi： ι・∪
- す su： £
- せ se： 世・Ш
- そ so： ξ・ζ・`ﾉ・丶/・ヽ丿
- た ta： ﾅ=・+=・†ﾆ・ﾅﾆ
- ち chi： 干・千・于・5
- つ tsu： っ・ッ・⊃
- て te： τ・〒
- と to： ┠・┝・┣・├
- な na： ﾅょ・十ょ・†ょ・ﾅg
- に ni： (ﾆ・|=・丨ﾆ・L=・I=・
- ぬ nu： йu
- ね ne： йё
- の no： /・丿・σ
- は ha： ﾊ〃【バ】・ﾊo【パ】・'`・八・l£・(£・ﾉ|・ﾉl・ﾚ£
- ひ hi： ﾋ〃【ビ】・ﾋo【ピ】・匕
- ふ fu： ﾌ〃【ブ】・ﾌo【プ】・ヴ
- へ he： ﾍ〃【べ】・ﾍo【ペ】・～
- ほ ho： ﾎ〃【ボ】・ﾎo【ポ】・朮
- ま ma： ма・мα
- み mi： 彡
- む mu： £′・厶
- め me： ×・x・χ・乂
- も mo： м○・мσ
- や ya： ゃ・ャ
- ゆ yu： ゅ・ュ・ф
- よ yo： ょ・ョ・∋・чo
- ら ra： яа
- り ri： L|・l)・ﾚ｣・ﾚ)・┗』・└丿
- る ru： ゐ・ゑ・儿・lﾚ・｣レ
- れ re： яё
- ろ ro： з・З・□・回
- わ wa： ゎ・ヮ・wα
- を wo： щo
- ん n： ω・冫・w・h
- ー (long vowel mark)： →・⇒

== Compound kanji ==
Here are some examples of gyaru-moji created from compound kanji. The kanji characters are followed by their reading and meaning, and the gyaru-moji derived from them:

- watashi (私, "I") → 禾ム
- kami (神, "god") → ネ申
- hayashi (林, "woods") → 木木

== Examples ==
Usual Japanese writing	Gyaru-moji	Meaning
ohayō (おはよう)	才（よчoぅ	Good morning
pokemon (ポケモン)	尓o ヶ 毛 ω	Pokémon
Takeshi ga suki (タケシが好き)	夕ヶ =/ ｶゞ 女子(ｷ	I like Takeshi.

== Cultural attitudes ==
As a youth culture element produced by women, gyaru-moji is not well received by the older Japanese public. From a traditionalist perspective, gyaru-moji rejects the elegant, painstaking brushstrokes of Japanese writing embraced by the art of Japanese calligraphy. From a contemporary perspective, gyaru-moji may be likened to other recent comical scripts, such as the bubble-like maru-moji from the 1980s. Since its widespread use in the early 2000s, television programs and public attention has taken note of gyaru-moji. However, this innovative writing system subverts cultural norms and breaks linguistic barriers, endowing gyaru-moji with a rebellious nature.

== See also ==
- Japanese typographic symbols for explanations of some of the above Japanese symbols.
- Goroawase, a different form of obfuscated Japanese based on numerical substitutions.
- Martian language, a similar phenomenon in the Chinese language.
- Emoji
- Leet
- Yaminjeongeum
- IDN homograph attack
