= IDN homograph attack =

Visually similar letters in domain names

An internationalized domain name (IDN) homograph attack (also homoglyph attack) is a method used by malicious parties to deceive computer users about the identity of the remote system they are communicating with. This is achieved by exploiting the fact that many different characters look alike and the user is unlikely to spot a subtle substitution. For example, the Cyrillic, Greek and Latin alphabets each have a letter ⟨o⟩ that has the same shape but have different code points. (Note: U+043E о CYRILLIC SMALL LETTER O, U+03BF ο GREEK SMALL LETTER OMICRON, U+006F o LATIN SMALL LETTER O)

This kind of spoofing attack is also known as script spoofing. Unicode supports numerous scripts (writing systems), and, for a number of reasons, similar-looking characters (such as Greek Ο, Latin O, and Cyrillic О) each has its own code point despite being homoglyphs. Their incorrect or malicious usage is potentially an opportunity for security attacks. Thus, for example, a regular user of exаmple.com (exаmple.com) may be lured to click on it unquestioningly as an apparently familiar link, unaware that the third letter is not the Latin character ⟨a⟩ but rather the Cyrillic character ⟨а⟩ and is thus an entirely different domain from the intended one.

The registration of homographic domain names is akin to typosquatting, in that both forms of attacks use a similar-looking name to a more established domain to fool a user. (Note: For example, Microsfot.com) The major difference is that in typosquatting the perpetrator attracts victims by relying on natural transposition errors commonly made when a URL is entered manually, while in homograph spoofing the perpetrator deceives the victims by presenting visually indistinguishable hyperlinks. Indeed, it would be a rare accident for a web user to type, for example, a Cyrillic letter within an otherwise English word, turning, say, "bank" into "bаnk". There are cases in which an abusive registration can use both typosquatting and homograph spoofing; the pairs of l/I, i/j, and 0/O are all both close together on keyboards and, depending on the typeface (computer font), in some cases can be difficult or impossible to distinguish visually.

== History ==
Homoglyphs are common in the three major European alphabets: Latin, Greek and Cyrillic. Unicode does not attempt to unify these glyphs and instead separates most scripts.

An early nuisance of this kind, pre-dating the Internet and even text terminals, was the confusion between l (lowercase letter "L") / 1 (the number "one") and O (capital letter for vowel "o") / 0 (the number "zero"). Some typewriters even omitted digits 0 and 1, as users could type a lowercase L or uppercase O instead. On computers, where the zero/O distinction often matters, slashed zeros became widely used so they could be clearly distinguished from Os when reading or typing.

Even earlier, handwriting provided rich opportunities for confusion. A notable example is the etymology of the word "zenith". The translation from the Arabic "samt" included the scribe's confusing of "m" into "ni". This was common in medieval blackletter, which did not connect the vertical columns on the letters i, m, n, or u, making them difficult to distinguish when several were in a row. The latter, as well as "rn"/"m"/"rri" ("RN"/"M"/"RRI") confusion, is still possible for a human eye even with modern advanced computer technology.

Unicode contributes to homograph attacks due to its combining characters, accents, several types of hyphen, etc., often due to inadequate rendering support, especially with smaller font sizes and the wide variety of fonts.

Intentional look-alike character substitution with different alphabets has been known in various contexts. For example, Faux Cyrillic has been used as an amusement or attention-grabber and "Volapuk encoding", in which Cyrillic script is represented by similar Latin characters, was used in early days of the Internet as a way to overcome the lack of support for the Cyrillic alphabet. Another example is that vehicle registration plates can have both Cyrillic (for domestic usage in Cyrillic script countries) and Latin (for international driving) with the same letters. Registration plates that are issued in Greece are limited to using letters of the Greek alphabet that have homoglyphs in the Latin alphabet, as European Union regulations require the use of Latin letters.

== Homographs in ASCII ==
ASCII has several characters or pairs of characters that look alike and are known as homographs (or homoglyphs). Spoofing attacks based on these similarities are known as homograph spoofing attacks. For example, 0 (the number zero) and O (the letter), l (lowercase "L"), and I (uppercase "i").

In a typical example of a hypothetical attack, someone could register a domain name that appears almost identical to an existing domain but goes somewhere else. For example, the domain "rnicrosoft.com" begins with "r" and "n", not "m". Other examples are G00GLE.COM which looks much like GOOGLE.COM in some fonts. Using a mix of uppercase and lowercase characters, googIe.com (capital i, not lowercase L) looks much like google.com in some fonts. PayPal was a target of a phishing scam exploiting this, using the domain PayPaI.com. In certain narrow-spaced fonts such as Tahoma (the default in the address bar in Windows XP), placing a c in front of a j, l or i will produce homoglyphs such as cl cj ci (d g a).

== Homographs in internationalized domain names ==
In multilingual computer systems, different logical characters may have identical appearances. For example, Unicode character U+0430, Cyrillic small letter a ("а"), can look identical to Unicode character U+0061, Latin small letter a, ("a") which is the lowercase "a" used in English. Hence wikipediа.org (xn--wikipedi-86g.org; the Cyrillic version) instead of wikipedia.org (the Latin version).

The problem arises from the different treatment of the characters in the user's mind and the computer's programming. From the viewpoint of the user, a Cyrillic "а" within a Latin string is a Latin "a"; there is no difference in the glyphs for these characters in most fonts. However, the computer treats them differently when processing the character string as an identifier. Thus, the user's assumption of a one-to-one correspondence between the visual appearance of a name and the named entity breaks down.

Internationalized domain names provide a backward-compatible way for domain names to use the full Unicode character set, and this standard is already widely supported. However this system expanded the character repertoire from a few dozen characters in a single alphabet to many thousands of characters in many scripts; this greatly increased the scope for homograph attacks.

This opens a rich vein of opportunities for phishing and other varieties of fraud. An attacker could register a domain name that looks just like that of a legitimate website, but in which some of the letters have been replaced by homographs in another alphabet. The attacker could then send e-mail messages purporting to come from the original site, but directing people to the bogus site. The spoof site could then record information such as passwords or account details, while passing traffic through to the real site. The victims may never notice the difference, until suspicious or criminal activity occurs with their accounts.

In December 2001 Evgeniy Gabrilovich and Alex Gontmakher, both from Technion, Israel, published a paper titled "The Homograph Attack", which described an attack that used Unicode URLs to spoof a website URL. To prove the feasibility of this kind of attack, the researchers successfully registered a variant of the domain name microsoft.com which incorporated Cyrillic characters.

Problems of this kind were anticipated before IDN was introduced, and guidelines were issued to registries to try to avoid or reduce the problem. For example, it was advised that registries only accept characters from the Latin alphabet and that of their own country, not all of Unicode characters, but this advice was neglected by major TLDs.

On February 6, 2005, Cory Doctorow reported that this exploit was disclosed by 3ric Johanson at the hacker conference Shmoocon. Web browsers supporting IDNA appeared to direct the URL http://www.pаypal.com/, in which the first a character is replaced by a Cyrillic а, to the site of the well known payment site PayPal, but actually led to a spoofed web site with different content. Popular browsers continued to have problems properly displaying international domain names through April 2017. The following alphabets have characters that are often used for spoofing attacks, although other alphabets can also be used:

=== Cyrillic ===
Cyrillic is, by far, the most commonly used alphabet for homoglyphs, largely because it contains 11 lowercase glyphs that are identical or nearly identical to Latin counterparts.

The Cyrillic letters а, с, е, о, р, х and у have optical counterparts in the basic Latin alphabet and look close or identical to a, c, e, o, p, x and y. Cyrillic З, Ч and б resemble the numerals 3, 4 and 6. Italic type generates more homoglyphs: дтпи or дтпи (дтпи in standard type), resembling dmnu (in some fonts д can be used, since its italic form resembles a lowercase g; however, in most mainstream fonts, д instead resembles a partial differential sign, ∂).

If capital letters are counted, АВСЕНІЈКМОРЅТХ can substitute ABCEHIJKMOPSTX, in addition to the capitals for the lowercase Cyrillic homoglyphs.

Cyrillic non-Russian problematic letters are і and i, ј and j, ԛ and q, ѕ and s, ԝ and w, Ү and Y, while Ғ and F, Ԍ and G bear some resemblance to each other. Cyrillic ӓёїӧ can also be used if an IDN itself is being spoofed, to fake äëïö.

While Komi De (ԁ), shha (һ), palochka (Ӏ) and izhitsa (ѵ) bear strong resemblance to Latin d, h, l and v, these letters are either rare or archaic and are not widely supported in most standard fonts (they are not included in the WGL-4). Attempting to use them could cause a ransom note effect.

=== Greek ===
From the Greek alphabet, only omicron (ο) and sometimes nu (ν) appear identical to a Latin alphabet letter in the lowercase used for URLs. Fonts that are in italic type will feature Greek alpha (α) looking like a Latin a.

This list increases if close matches are also allowed (such as Greek εικηρτυωχγν) for eiknptuwxyv). Using capital letters, the list expands greatly. Greek ΑΒΕΗΙΚΜΝΟΡΤΧΥΖ looks identical to Latin ABEHIKMNOPTXYZ. Greek ΑΓΒΕΗΚΜΟΠΡΤΦΧ looks similar to Cyrillic АГВЕНКМОПРТФХ (as do Cyrillic Лл (Лл) and Greek Λ in certain geometric sans-serif fonts), Greek letters κ and ο look similar to Cyrillic к and о. Besides this Greek τ, φ can be similar to Cyrillic т, ф in some fonts, Greek δ looks like Cyrillic б, and the Cyrillic а also italicizes the same as its Latin counterpart, making it possible to substitute it for alpha or vice versa. The lunate form of sigma, Ϲϲ, resembles both Latin Cc and Cyrillic Сс. Especially in contemporary typefaces, Cyrillic л is rendered with a glyph indistinguishable from Greek π.

If an IDN itself is being spoofed, Greek beta β can be a substitute for German eszett ß in some fonts (and in fact, code page 437 treats them as equivalent), as can Greek end-of-word-variant sigma ς for ç; accented Greek substitutes όίά can usually be used for óíá in many fonts, with the last of these (alpha) again only resembling a in italic type.

=== Armenian ===
The Armenian alphabet can also contribute critical characters: several Armenian characters like օ, ո, ս, as well as capital Տ and Լ are often completely identical to Latin characters in modern fonts, and symbols which similar enough to pass off, such as ցհոօզս which look like ghnoqu, յ which resembles j (albeit dotless), and ք, which can either resemble p or f depending on the font; ա can resemble Cyrillic ш. However, the use of Armenian is, luckily, a bit less reliable: Not all standard fonts feature Armenian glyphs (whereas the Greek and Cyrillic scripts are); Windows prior to Windows 7 rendered Armenian in a distinct font, Sylfaen, of which the mixing of Armenian with Latin would appear obviously different if using a font other than Sylfaen or a Unicode typeface. (This is known as a ransom note effect.) The current version of Tahoma, used in Windows 7, supports Armenian (previous versions did not). Furthermore, this font differentiates Latin g from Armenian ց.

Two letters in Armenian (Ձշ) also can resemble the number 2, Յ resembles 3, while another (վ) sometimes resembles the number 4.

=== Hebrew ===
Hebrew spoofing is generally rare. Only three letters from that alphabet can reasonably be used to spoof Latin script: samekh (ס), which sometimes resembles o, vav with diacritic (וֹ), which resembles an i, and heth (ח), which resembles the letter n. Less accurate approximants for some other alphanumerics can also be found, but these are usually only accurate enough to use for the purposes of foreign branding and not for substitution. Furthermore, the Hebrew alphabet is written from right to left and trying to mix it with left-to-right glyphs may cause problems.

=== Thai ===
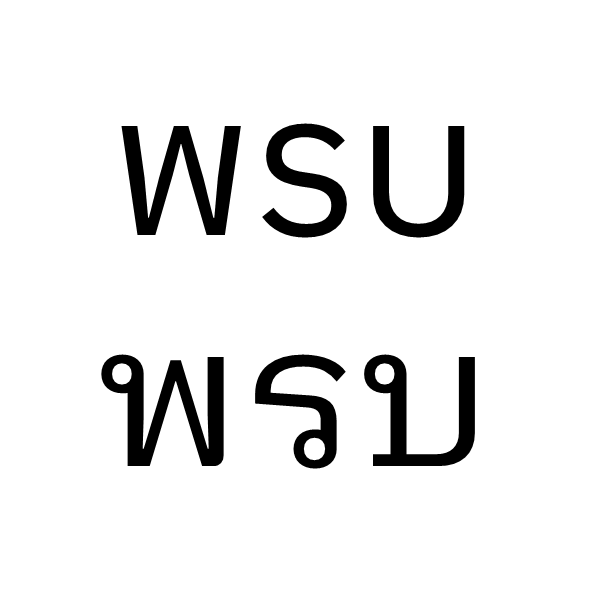
Top: Thai glyphs rendered in a modern font (IBM Plex) in which they resemble Latin glyphs. Bottom: The same glyphs rendered with traditional loops.

Though the Thai script has historically had a distinct look with numerous loops and small flourishes, modern Thai typography, beginning with Manoptica in 1973 and continuing through IBM Plex in the modern era, has increasingly adopted a simplified style in which Thai characters are represented with glyphs strongly resembling Latin letters. ค (A), ท (n), น (u), บ (U), ป (J), พ (W), ร (S), and ล (a) are among the Thai glyphs that can closely resemble Latin.

=== Chinese ===
The Chinese language can be problematic for homographs as many characters exist as both traditional (regular script) and simplified Chinese characters. In the .org domain, registering one variant renders the other unavailable to anyone; in .biz a single Chinese-language IDN registration delivers both variants as active domains (which must have the same domain name server and the same registrant). .hk (.香港) also adopts this policy.

=== Other scripts ===
Other Unicode scripts in which homographs can be found include Number Forms (Roman numerals), CJK Compatibility and Enclosed CJK Letters and Months (certain abbreviations), Latin (certain digraphs), Currency Symbols, Mathematical Alphanumeric Symbols, and Alphabetic Presentation Forms (typographic ligatures).

=== Accented characters ===
Two names which differ only in an accent on one character may look very similar, particularly when the substitution involves the dotted letter i; the tittle (dot) on the i can be replaced with a diacritic (such as a grave accent or acute accent; both ì and í are included in most standard character sets and fonts) that can only be detected with close inspection. In most top-level domain registries, wíkipedia.tld (xn--wkipedia-c2a.tld) and wikipedia.tld are two different names which may be held by different registrants. One exception is .ca, where reserving the plain-ASCII version of the domain prevents another registrant from claiming an accented version of the same name.

=== Non-displayable characters ===
Unicode includes many characters which are not displayed by default, such as the zero-width space. In general, ICANN prohibits any domain with these characters from being registered, regardless of TLD.

=== Known homograph attacks ===
In 2011, an unknown source (registering under the name "Completely Anonymous") registered a domain name homographic to television station KBOI-TV's to create a fake news website. The sole purpose of the site was to spread an April Fool's Day joke regarding the Governor of Idaho issuing a supposed ban on the sale of music by Justin Bieber.

In September 2017, security researcher Ankit Anubhav discovered an IDN homograph attack where the attackers registered adoḅe.com to deliver the Betabot trojan.

== Defending against the attack ==
=== Client-side mitigation ===
The simplest defense is for web browsers not to support IDNA or other similar mechanisms, or for users to turn off whatever support their browsers have. That could mean blocking access to IDNA sites, but generally browsers permit access and just display IDNs in Punycode. Either way, this amounts to abandoning non-ASCII domain names.

- Mozilla Firefox versions 22 and later display IDNs if either the TLD prevents homograph attacks by restricting which characters can be used in domain names or labels do not mix scripts for different languages. Otherwise, IDNs are displayed in Punycode.
- Google Chrome versions 51 and later use an algorithm similar to the one used by Firefox. Previous versions display an IDN only if all of its characters belong to one (and only one) of the user's preferred languages. Chromium and Chromium-based browsers such as Microsoft Edge (since 2020) and Opera also use the same algorithm.
- Safari's approach is to render problematic character sets as Punycode. This can be changed by altering the settings in Mac OS X's system files.
- Internet Explorer versions 7 and later allow IDNs except for labels that mix scripts for different languages. Labels that mix scripts are displayed in Punycode. There are exceptions to locales where ASCII characters are commonly mixed with localized scripts. Internet Explorer 7 was capable of using IDNs, but it imposes restrictions on displaying non-ASCII domain names based on a user-defined list of allowed languages and provides an anti-phishing filter that checks suspicious websites against a remote database of known phishing sites.
- Microsoft Edge Legacy converts all Unicode into Punycode.

As an additional defense, Internet Explorer 7, Firefox 2.0 and above, and Opera 9.10 include phishing filters that attempt to alert users when they visit malicious websites. As of April 2017, several browsers (including Chrome, Firefox, and Opera) were displaying IDNs consisting purely of Cyrillic characters normally (not as punycode), allowing spoofing attacks. Chrome tightened IDN restrictions in version 59 to prevent this attack.

These methods of defense only extend to within a browser. Homographic URLs that house malicious software can still be distributed, without being displayed as Punycode, through e-mail, social networking or other websites without being detected until the user actually clicks the link. While the fake link will show in Punycode when it is clicked, by this point the page has already begun loading into the browser. Ways to check if the user is suspicious (or just cautious) are to copy the link into a browser's address bar and see if it renders as Punycode; or simply search the text for, for example, typed-in "microsoft", which will fail for spoofed http://www.miсrosoft.com.

=== Server-side/registry operator mitigation ===
The IDN homographs database is a Python library that allows developers to defend against this using machine learning-based character recognition.

ICANN has implemented a policy prohibiting any potential internationalized TLD from choosing letters that could resemble an existing Latin TLD and thus be used for homograph attacks. Proposed IDN TLDs .бг (Bulgaria), .укр (Ukraine) and .ελ (Greece) have been rejected or stalled because of their perceived resemblance to Latin letters. All three (and Serbian .срб and Mongolian .мон) have later been accepted. Three-letter TLD are considered safer than two-letter TLD, since they are harder to match to normal Latin ISO-3166 country domains; although the potential to match new generic domains remains, such generic domains are far more expensive than registering a second- or third-level domain address, making it cost-prohibitive to try to register a homoglyphic TLD for the sole purpose of making fraudulent domains (which itself would draw ICANN scrutiny).

The Russian registry operator Coordination Center for TLD RU only accepts Cyrillic names for the top-level domain .рф, forbidding a mix with Latin or Greek characters. However, the problem in .com and other gTLDs remains open.

=== Research based mitigations ===
In their 2019 study, Suzuki et al. introduced ShamFinder, a program for recognizing IDNs, shedding light on their prevalence in real-world scenarios. Similarly, Chiba et al. (2019) designed DomainScouter, a system adept at detecting diverse homograph IDNs in domains through analyzing an estimated 4.4 million registered IDNs across 570 Top-Level Domains (TLDs) it was able to successfully identify 8,284 IDN homographs, including many previously unidentified cases targeting brands in languages other than English.

== See also ==
- Security issues in Unicode
- Internationalized domain name
- Homoglyph
- Faux Cyrillic
- Metal umlaut
- Duplicate characters in Unicode
- Unicode equivalence
- Typosquatting
- Leet
- Gyaru-moji
- Yaminjeongeum
- Martian language
