= Coby Electronics Corporation =

American manufacturer of consumer electronics products

- The name "COBY" in a font a la the Sony logo
- Company type: Private
- Industry: Consumer electronics
- Founded: 1990; 36 years ago
- Defunct: 2013; 13 years ago
- Fate: Acquired by Gordon Brothers Group
- Headquarters: Lake Success, New York
- Key people: Young Dong Lee (Legal Representative/CEO)
- Products: Home and portable A/V consumer electronics
- Revenue: ▲US$300 million
- Number of employees: 2,000
- Website: www.cobyusa.com

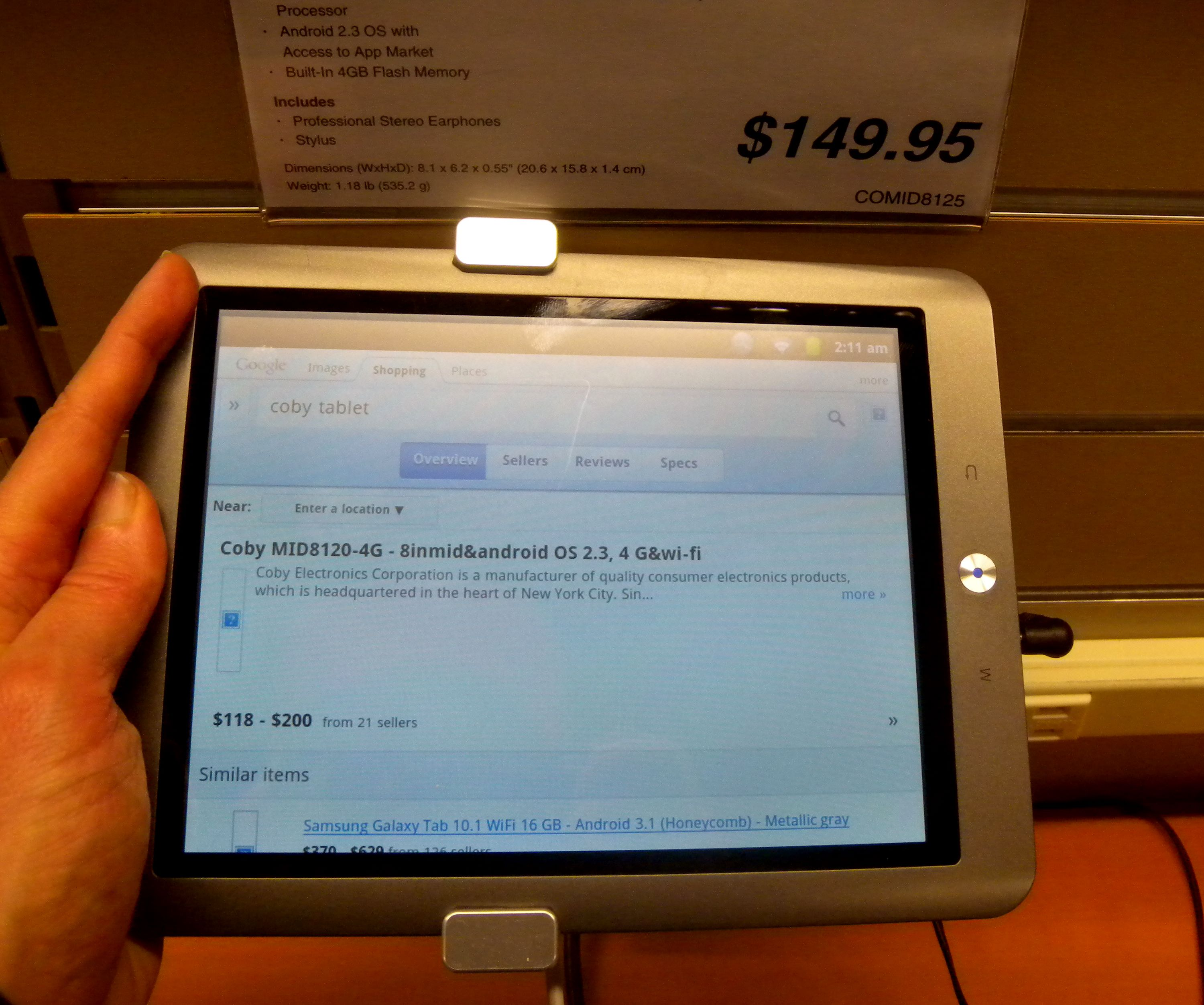
Coby's low-end Android tablet

Coby Electronics Corporation was an American manufacturer of consumer electronics products headquartered in Lake Success, New York, with offices and factories around the world (including the United States, Mexico, and China). With the joint efforts of Coby Electronics Co. of Hong Kong and Coby Electronics Corp. of the United States, the products reached consumers in Asia, North America, South America and Europe; however, the company mostly sold in Europe and the United States. Coby also served as an OEM manufacturer for brands including Samsung, NEC, RadioShack's Presidian brand and Hyundai. Its products are still available today.

Coby closed in June 2013 due to financial trouble. Gordon Brothers Group acquired all assets of Coby Electronics, in August 2013, resuming sales. Gordon Brothers Group purchase did not include liabilities such as customer warranties.

== History ==
Coby was founded in 1990 by Young Dong Lee (born 1955 in South Korea), who owned 100 percent of its capital stock. Its name came from deleting the "w" and second "o" in Cowboy. The logo was written in Bookman Old Style Bold, which resembles the serif font used in the Sony logo. Lee originally owned an electronics wholesaler called Cowboy.

The company's original headquarters was in an industrial area of Maspeth, Queens. In 2008, it moved the world headquarters to Lake Success, New York. The former headquarters remained as a company warehouse.

With the establishment of a new factory and new manufacturing processes in early 2006, the company very publicly sought to re-brand itself as a maker of higher-quality goods; they tended, however, to be in the low-price range. Its main factory was on 400 acres (1.6 km^{2}) in Jiangxi Province in China. It was designed to accommodate up to 5,000 employees.

In March 2013, Coby Electronics lost a case in New York State by Koninklijke Philips Electronics, N.V for failure to pay DVD licensing fees.

In April 2013, Coby Electronics laid off 35% of their work staff and closed a warehouse in Savannah, GA, citing slow economic times.

=== Closure ===
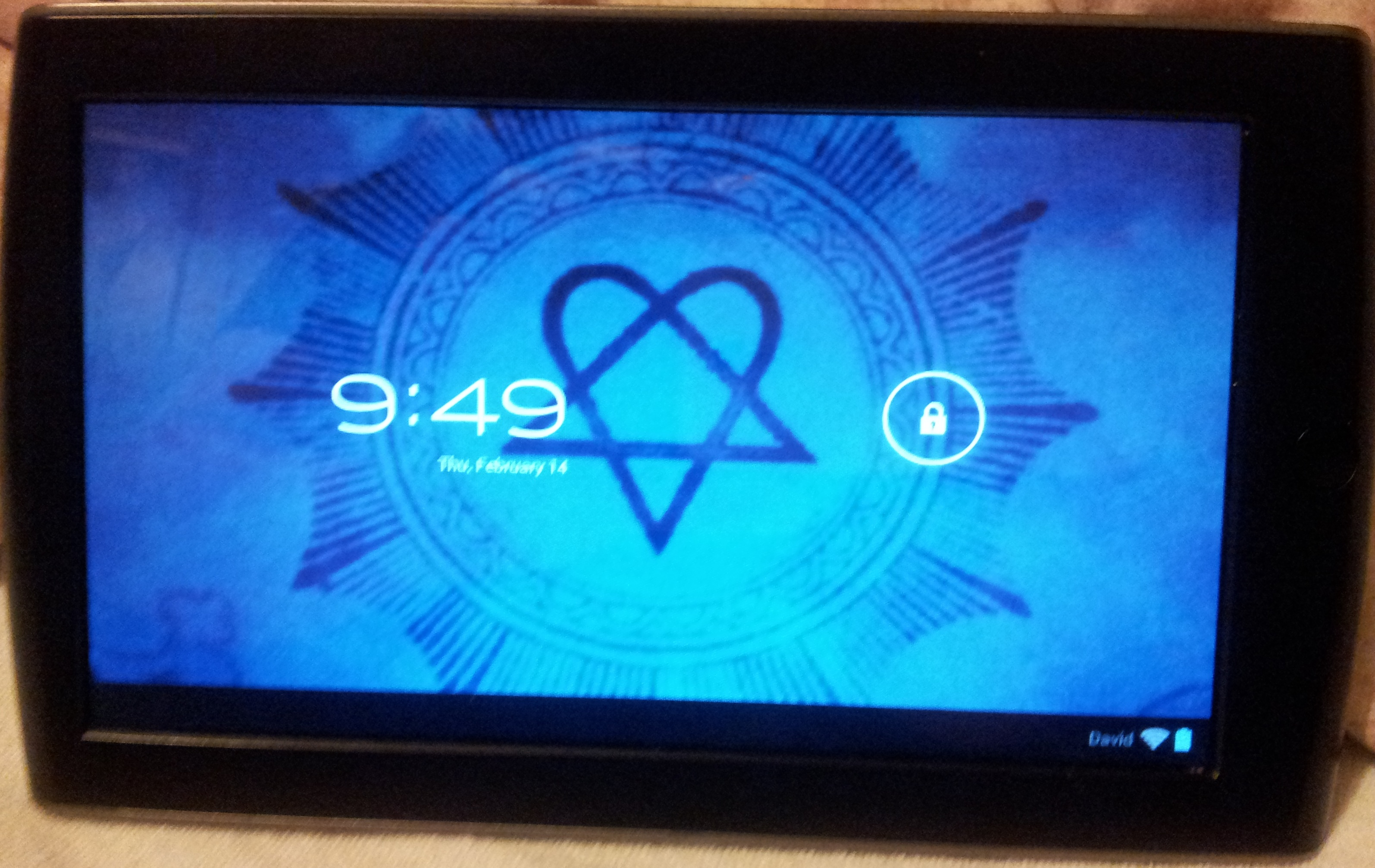
Coby Kyros brand tablet.

Due to severe financial problems following a contract dispute with Philips, on August 16, 2013, Coby Electronics Corporation went out of business, with Gordon Brothers Group acquiring inventory, fixtures, equipment, intellectual property, global trademarks and patents. Gordon Brothers have stated that they did not assume any of Coby's liabilities, including customer warranties, and they will attempt to revive the company as a consumer electronics firm. hhgregg was the only known retailer honoring warranties for Coby products purchased from their stores, but the retailer has since gone out of business.

=== Television recall after closure ===
On December 13, 2013, the Consumer Product Safety Commission announced the recall of multiple Coby flat-screen television due to overheating and fire concerns. Due to Coby being out of business, select retailers who sold the TFTV3229 set have taken on the responsibility to replace each of the sets returned by their customers.

== Products ==
Coby products spanned home and portable audio and video electronics plus accessories. Leading categories included LCD televisions, internet tablets, MP3 players, tablet DVD players, digital picture frames and surround-sound home theater systems. Available in metropolitan and regional brick and mortar storefronts or via the Internet, Coby's products were found in a wide range of locations.

=== Recalls ===
Coby voluntarily conducted four product recalls three years, on October 22, 2009, October 8, 2008, April 18, 2007, and November 8, 2007. In all instances, Coby provided full refunds to all consumers. Some consumers have reported issues with the MP822-4G, and Coby used to have a downloadable "fix" on its website.

== Company names ==
This company also did business under the name of Coby Electronics Inc. and Foshan Coby Electronics Corporation.

=== Domain name ===
In 2006, Coby Electronics Corporation unsuccessfully attempted to use the Uniform Domain-Name Dispute-Resolution Policy to acquire the "coby.com" domain from Coby O'Brien, an individual who had first registered it in 1996; this is commonly referred to as reverse domain hijacking. But O'Brien successfully defended his registration of the domain. Coby Electronics Corporation used "cobyusa.com" instead.
