= Urvan =

Urvan may refer to:

- Nissan Urvan, a cargo van
- urvan, a concept of the soul in Zoroastrianism
- Urvan, Azerbaijan, a village in Azerbaijan
- Urvan (Kabardino-Balkaria), a rural locality in Russia]
- Michael Urvan, American gamer who was party to the sting.com domain name dispute
