= Procter & Gamble =

American multinational consumer goods corporation

The Procter & Gamble Company
- Secondary logo since 2013, concurrently used with the 2002 lettermark

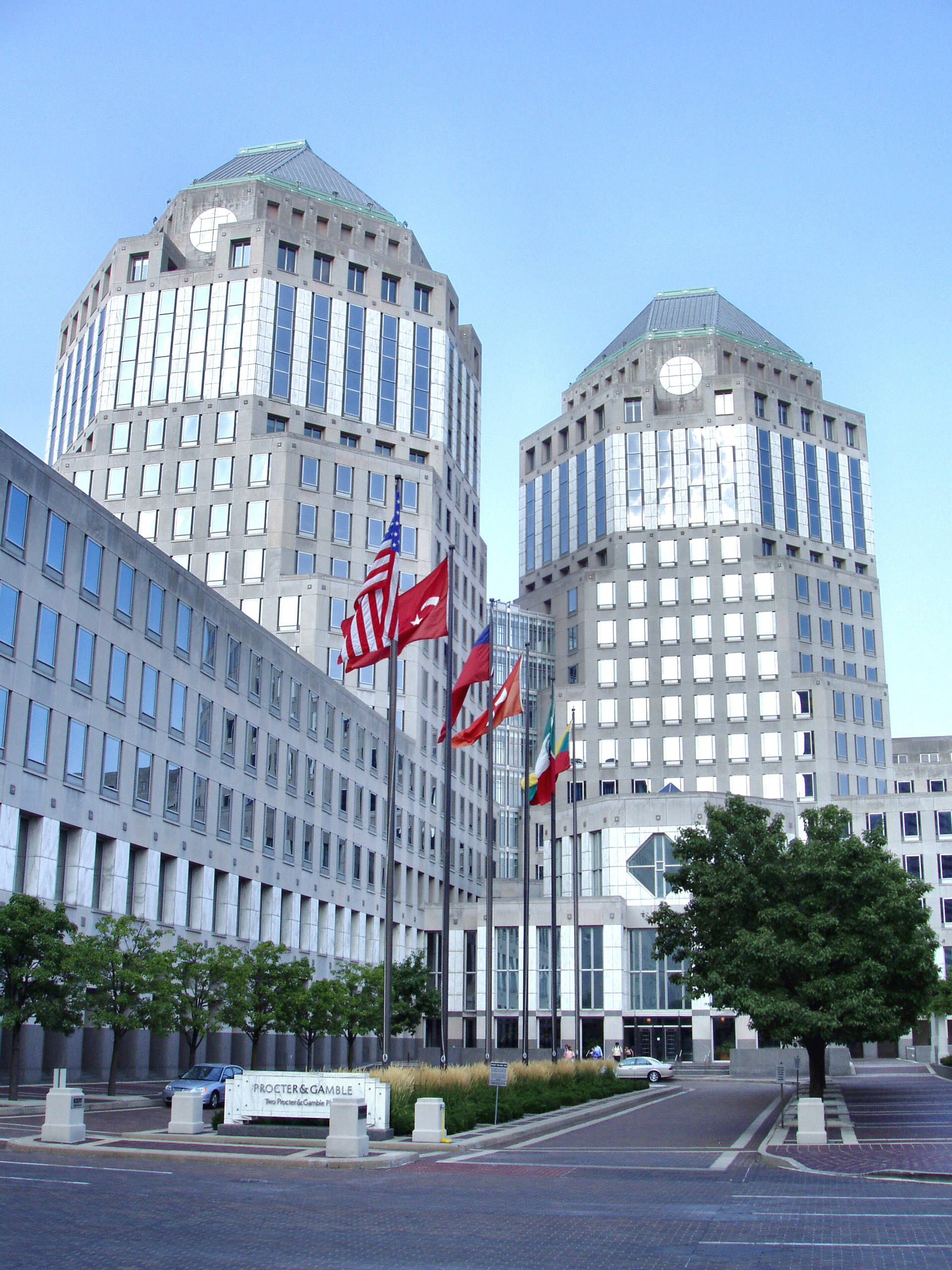
- Headquarters in Cincinnati
- Trade name: P&G
- Type: Public
- Traded as: NYSE: PG; DJIA component; S&P 100 component; S&P 500 component
- Industry: Fast-moving consumer goods Consumer goods
- Founded: October 31, 1837; 189 years ago
- Founders: William Procter; James Gamble
- Headquarters: Cincinnati, Ohio, US
- Area served: Worldwide
- Key people: Shailesh Jejurikar (President, CEO, Chairman of the Board); Tom Moody (Senior Vice President, Northern Europe)
- Products: Cleaning agents; Personal care; Skin care; Hair care; Oral care; Grooming products; Dietary supplements; Baby care; Feminine hygiene; Paper towels & toilet paper
- Brands: Pampers; Tide; Ariel; Gillette; Pantene; Head & Shoulders; Olay; Crest; Oral-B; Always; Downy; Dawn; Bounty; Charmin; Febreze; Vicks; Old Spice; Braun; Swiffer; Cascade; Ambi Pur; (More)
- Revenue: ▲US$87.03 billion (FY 2026)
- Operating income: ▼US$19.75 billion (FY 2026)
- Net income: ▲US$16.05 billion (FY 2026)
- Total assets: ▲US$126.52 billion (FY 2026)
- Total equity: ▲US$54.31 billion (FY 2026)
- Number of employees: 104,000 (June 2026)
- Subsidiaries: Procter & Gamble Korea; Procter & Gamble Pakistan; Procter & Gamble Philippines; Procter & Gamble Australia Pty. Ltd.; Braun
- Website: us.pg.com
- Footnotes; Financials as of June 30, 2025.

Logo used from 1992 to 2002.

Primary logo used since 2002 on P&G branded products, formerly used as a corporate logo until 2013.

The Procter & Gamble Company (P&G) is an American multinational consumer goods corporation incorporated and headquartered in Cincinnati, Ohio. The company was founded in 1837 by William Procter and James Gamble.

The company operates five divisions:

- Beauty (17% of 2026 revenues), which includes Head & Shoulders, Herbal Essences, Pantene, Rejoice, Olay, Old Spice, Safeguard, Secret, SK-II, and Native;
- Grooming (9% of 2026 revenues), which includes Braun, Gillette, and Venus;
- Health Care (15% of 2026 revenues), which includes Crest, Oral-B, Metamucil, Neurobion, Pepto-Bismol, and Vicks;
- Fabric & Home Care (35% of 2026 revenues), which includes Ariel, Downy, Gain, Tide, Cascade, Dawn, Fairy, Febreze, Mr. Clean, and Swiffer;
- Baby, Feminine & Family Care (24% of 2026 revenues), which includes Luvs, Pampers, Always, Tampax, Bounty, Charmin, and Puffs.

The company owns brands that are in many cases the global brand leader in their category. Many of the brands have a market share greater than 25%.

The company generates 51% of its sales in the United States and 49% of its sales in other countries. The company manufactures 90% of its domestically sold merchandise in the United States.

The company is ranked 51st on the Fortune 500 and 60th on the Forbes Global 2000.

== History ==
=== Origins ===
Candlemaker William Procter, born in England, and soap maker James Gamble, born in Ireland, both emigrated to the US from the United Kingdom. They initially settled in Cincinnati, Ohio, and met when they married sisters Olivia and Elizabeth Norris. Alexander Norris, their father-in-law, persuaded them to become business partners, and in 1837, Procter & Gamble was created.

From 1858 to 1859, sales reached $1 million. By that point, about 80 employees worked for Procter & Gamble. During the American Civil War, the company won contracts to supply the Union Army with soap and candles. In addition to the increased profits experienced during the war, the military contracts introduced soldiers from all over the country to Procter & Gamble's products.

In the 1880s, Procter & Gamble began to market a new product, an inexpensive soap that floated in water. The company called the soap Ivory. William Arnett Procter, William Procter's grandson, began a profit-sharing program for the company's workforce in 1887. By giving the workers a stake in the company, he correctly assumed that they would be less likely to go on strike.

The company began to build factories in other locations in the United States because the demand for products had outgrown the capacity of the Cincinnati facilities. The company's leaders began to diversify its products as well, and in 1911 the company began producing Crisco, a shortening made of vegetable oils rather than animal fats.

Beginning in the 1880s, P&G advertised its wares in full-page advertisements in many general-interest magazines. By 1921, it had become a major international corporation with a diversified line of soaps, toiletries, and food products; in that year, its annual advertising budget reached $1 million. In the 1920s, P&G advertised its products on the new medium of radio and, from 1932 forward, was one of the biggest sponsors of daytime serials, which soon became known as soap operas. In the television era, P&G sponsored and produced some twenty soap operas across six decades; the division went on a hiatus after the end of As the World Turns in 2010 before The Gates launched on CBS in 2025 as a co-production with P&G.

=== International expansion ===
The company moved into other countries, both in terms of manufacturing and product sales, becoming an international corporation with its 1930 acquisition of the Thomas Hedley Co., based in Newcastle upon Tyne, England. Thomas Hedley was a company local to Newcastle upon Tyne, and was the start of P&G's expansion from its American operations. After this acquisition, P&G moved into Hedley's Newcastle City Road site and established its UK headquarters at Hedley House in Newcastle upon Tyne. It continued its UK operations by opening up a Manchester factory in 1933 (which expanded rapidly; 100% expansion by 1936), and constructing a London plant in 1937, however, it was Tyneside where P&G was solidly based. By 1948 these offices were proving inadequate for an expanding post-war business, and in 1953 P&G moved its UK administrative centre to purpose-built offices in Gosforth, Newcastle. The building was named Hedley House, in remembrance of the roots of P&G in Tyneside. Numerous new products and brand names were introduced over time, and Procter & Gamble began branching out into new areas. The company introduced Tide laundry detergent in 1946, Prell shampoo in 1947 and Joy, the first liquid synthetic detergent in 1949.

In 1955, Procter & Gamble began selling the first toothpaste to contain fluoride, known as Crest. Branching out once again in 1957, the company purchased paper mills from Charmin and began manufacturing toilet paper and other tissue paper products. The Hedley Research Laboratories on Whitley Road, Longbenton were officially opened on June 11 by Hugh Percy, 10th Duke of Northumberland. This site became known as Newcastle Innovation Centre (NIC) and as of 2013 was led by Charles Bragg. It cost £500,000 to build and equip. The site has been upgraded many times in the 50 years since its opening and currently focuses on the development of laundry detergents and machine dishwashing products for all parts of the world. Once again focusing on laundry, Procter & Gamble began making Downy-branded fabric softener in 1960 and Bounce fabric softener sheets in 1972. From 1957 to 1968, Procter & Gamble owned Clorox, the leading American manufacturer of liquid bleach; however, the Federal Trade Commission challenged the acquisition, and the U.S. Supreme Court decided against P&G in April 1967.

Procter & Gamble launched Head & Shoulders in 1961, the same year it began test-marketing Pampers disposable diapers. Prior to this point, disposable diapers, like Johnson & Johnson's Chux were not widely adopted, and cloth diapers remained the standard. Pampers provided a convenient alternative to cloth, though they increased landfill waste. In response to consumer interest in diaper ingredients, Pampers introduced the Pampers Pure collection in 2018, marketed as a natural alternative.

In 1962 Shultons established an Old Spice plant at the Northumberland town of Seaton Delaval. When Shultons was acquired by Procter & Gamble in 1990, it became another part of P&G's presence on Tyneside. The plant now manufactures many fragrances that P&G produce, both under its own brands and under licence. It is also the site for the 'company shop', where P&G staff and retirees can purchase P&G goods for a reduced price.

In 2000, the Gosforth offices were closed 43 years after their opening. This was done as part of a big corporate restructuring within P&G globally, and the UK's administrative centre became the Brooklands complex in Weybridge, Surrey. However, one of three global business service centres was established at Cobalt Business Park in North Tyneside. P&G has one building on the park, offering financial services to P&G companies in Europe, the Middle East and Africa. As has been the tradition, one pays homage to Thomas Hedley Co. and is called New Hedley House.

=== Further developments ===
Procter & Gamble acquired a number of other companies that diversified its product line and significantly increased profits. These acquisitions included Folgers Coffee, Norwich Eaton Pharmaceuticals (the makers of Pepto-Bismol), Richardson-Vicks, Noxell (Noxzema), Shulton's Old Spice, Max Factor, the Iams Company, and Pantene, among others. In 1994, the company made headlines for big losses resulting from leveraged positions in interest rate derivatives, and subsequently sued Bankers Trust for fraud; this placed its management in the unusual position of testifying in court that they had entered into transactions that they were not capable of understanding. In 1996, P&G again made headlines when the Food and Drug Administration approved a new product developed by the company, Olestra. Also known by its brand name "Olean", Olestra is a lower-calorie substitute for fat in cooking potato chips and other snacks.

In January 2005, P&G announced the acquisition of Gillette, causing P&G to overtake Unilever as the largest consumer goods company. This added brands such as Gillette razors, Duracell, Braun, and Oral-B to its stable. The acquisition was approved by the European Union and the Federal Trade Commission, with conditions to a spinoff of certain overlapping brands. P&G agreed to sell its SpinBrush battery-operated electric toothbrush business to Church & Dwight, and Gillette's Rembrandt toothpaste line to Johnson & Johnson. The deodorant brands Right Guard, Soft and Dri, and Dry Idea were sold to Dial Corporation. In 2001, Liquid Paper and Gillette's stationery division, Paper Mate, were sold to Newell Rubbermaid. The companies officially merged on October 1, 2005. In 2008, P&G branched into the record business with its sponsorship of Tag Records, as an endorsement for TAG Body Spray.

P&G's dominance in many categories of consumer products necessitates its corporate strategists to account for the likelihood of one of its products cannibalizing the sales of another through brand management.

In August 2009, Warner Chilcott acquired P&G's prescription-drug business for $3.1 billion.

P&G exited the food business in 2012 when it sold its Pringles snack food business to Kellogg's for $2.75 billion after the $2.35 billion deal with former suitor Diamond Foods fell short. The company had previously sold Jif peanut butter, Crisco shortening and oils, and Folgers coffee in separate transactions to the Ohio-based company Smucker's.

In April 2014, the company sold its Iams pet food business in all markets excluding Europe to Mars, Inc. for $2.9 billion. It sold the European Iams business to Spectrum Brands in December 2014.

=== Restructuring ===
On August 1, 2014, P&G announced it was streamlining the company, dropping and selling off around 100 brands from its product portfolio in order to focus on the remaining 65 brands, which produced 95% of the company's profits. A.G. Lafley, the company's chairman and CEO until October 2015, said the future P&G would be "a much simpler, much less complex company of leading brands that's easier to manage and operate".

In March 2015, the company divested its Vicks VapoSteam U.S. liquid inhalant business to Helen of Troy, part of a brand-restructuring operation. This deal was the first health-related divestiture under the brand-restructuring operation. The deal included a fully paid-up license to the Vicks VapoSteam trademarks and the U.S. license of P&G's Vicks VapoPad trademarks for scent pads. Most Vicks VapoSteam and VapoPads are used in Vicks humidifiers, vaporizers and other health care devices already marketed by Helen of Troy.

Later that same year in July, the company announced the sale of 43 of its beauty brands to Coty, a beauty-product manufacturer, in a US$13 billion deal. It cited sluggish growth of its beauty division as the reason for the divestiture. The sale was completed on October 3, 2016.

In February 2016, P&G completed the transfer of Duracell to Berkshire Hathaway through an exchange of shares.

In December 2018, Procter & Gamble completed the acquisition of the consumer health division of Merck Group (known as EMD Serono in North America) for €3.4 billion ($4.2 billion) and renamed it as Procter & Gamble Health Limited in May 2019.

In November 2018, P&G unveiled a simpler corporate structure with six business units that would be effective from July 2019.

In 2023, the company began optimizing its product offering. As part of this strategy, it plans to eliminate the bottom 25% of SKUs, which contribute very little to absolute retail sales. According to other comparable companies, a similar share of SKUs represents between 2% and 2.5% of its turnover at a global level.

In June 2025, the company announced 7,000 layoffs over the following 2 years due to uncertainty regarding Tariffs in the second Trump administration.

In January 2026, the company started leaning into luxury by launching diapers made with silk fibres under its brand Pampers, in a bid to boost the sales of its baby-care division. Sales have been declining due to low birth rates, even in China, the company's second largest market.

== Finances ==
For the fiscal year 2018, Procter & Gamble reported earnings of US$9.750 billion, with an annual revenue of US$66.832 billion, an increase of 2.7% over the previous fiscal cycle. The company's shares traded at over $86 per share in 2017, and its market capitalization was valued at over US$221.5 billion in October 2018. The company ranked No. 42 on the 2018 Fortune 500 list of the largest United States corporations by total revenue.

Year	Revenue in million US$	Net income in million US$	Total assets in millions US$	Employees
2005	56,741	6,923	61,527	
2006	68,222	8,684	135,695	
2007	74,832	10,340	138,014	
2008	79,257	12,075	143,992	
2009	76,694	13,436	134,833	135,000
2010	78,938	12,517	128,172	127,000
2011	82,559	11,564	138,354	129,000
2012	83,680	10,500	132,244	126,000
2013	84,167	11,068	139,263	121,000
2014	83,062	11,390	144,266	118,000
2015	76,279	6,777	129,495	110,000
2016	65,299	10,508	127,136	105,000
2017	65,058	15,326	120,406	95,000
2018	66,832	9,750	118,310	92,000
2019	67,684	3,897	115,095	97,000
2020	70,950	12,764	120,700	99,000
2021	76,118	14,035	119,307	101,000
2022	81,286	15,306	117,914	103,000
2023	82,006	14,653	120,829	107,000
2024	84,039	14,879	122,370	108,000

== Management ==
=== Board of directors ===
As of March 2026 the board of directors of Procter & Gamble has 14 members:

- B. Marc Allen
- Craig Arnold
- Brett Biggs
- Sheila Bonini
- Amy L. Chang
- Shailesh Jejurikar
- Joseph Jimenez
- Christopher Kempczinski
- Debra L. Lee
- Christine McCarthy
- Ashley McEvoy
- Jon R. Moeller
- Rob Portman
- Raj Subramaniam

Previous members of the board include:

- W. James McNerney, Jr.
- Nelson Peltz
- Scott Cook
- Angela Braly
- Frank Blake
- Meg Whitman
- Terry J. Lundgren

In March 2011, Rajat Gupta resigned from the board after an SEC accusation of Galleon Group insider trading.

In May 2011, the company was noted for having 11 female directors that were all on the Most Powerful Women list by Fortune.

In May 2013, Robert A. McDonald announced his retirement and was replaced by A.G. Lafley, who returned as chairman, president, and CEO.

David S. Taylor succeeded Lafley as president and CEO in 2015. He was subsequently named chairman of the board in 2016.

Jon R. Moeller succeeded Taylor as CEO in 2021. In July 2025, Procter & Gamble announced Shailesh G. Jejurikar would succeed Jon R. Moeller as president and CEO in 2026.

== Awards and recognition ==
Procter & Gamble ranked 2nd in the world in the 2024 review of WIPO's annual World Intellectual Property Indicators, with 525 designs in industrial design registrations being published under the Hague System during 2023.

Fortune magazine awarded P&G a top spot on its list of "Global Top Companies for Leaders", and ranked the company at 15th place of the "World's Most Admired Companies" list. Chief Executive magazine named P&G the best overall company for leadership development in its list of the "40 Best Companies for Leaders".

In October 2008, P&G was named one of "Canada's Top 100 Employers" by Mediacorp Canada Inc. and was featured in Maclean's newsmagazine. Later that month, P&G was also named one of Greater Toronto's Top Employers, which was announced by the Toronto Star newspaper.

In October 2013, the company was named the fourth-most in-demand employer in the world according to analytic data sourced by LinkedIn.

In August 2013, P&G was named the 14th-hardest company to interview for by Glassdoor. In November 2013, Glassdoor also named it as a top 25 company for career opportunities. In February 2014, Glassdoor placed P&G 34th on its annual Best Places to Work list.

In November 2015, P&G was named the Careers in Africa Employer of Choice 2015 following a survey of over 13,000 African professionals from across the globe. P&G was also recognized as the most desirable FMCG business to work for in Africa.

P&G was recognized as one of Forbes World's Most Reputable Companies in 2016, 2017, and 2023.

== Brands ==
As of 2015, 21 of P&G's brands have more than a billion dollars in net annual sales. Most of these brands – including Bounty, Crest, Always, and Tide – are global products available on several continents. In 2005, Procter & Gamble made a $57 billion deal to buy Gillette, which combined some of the world's top brands including, signature razors, Duracell batteries, Braun, and Oral-B brands. P&G's products are available in North America, Latin America, Europe, the Middle East, Africa, Asia, Australia, and New Zealand.

In 2018, P&G's fabric and home care division accounted for 32% of the company's total net sales, the highest of all its divisions. The division includes Downy, Gain, Tide, Febreze, and Dawn.

According to Advertising Age, Procter & Gamble spent $4.3 billion advertising various brands in the United States in 2015, making it the top advertiser in the country.

Manufacturing operations are based in these countries:

- United States
- Canada
- Mexico
- Philippines
- Hungary
- Argentina
- Vietnam
- Indonesia
- Romania
- United Kingdom
- France
- Ukraine
- Spain
- Germany
- Poland
- Czech Republic
- Russia
- Saudi Arabia
- United Arab Emirates
- Australia
- New Zealand
- Brazil
- Austria
- Japan
- India
- China
- South Korea
- Pakistan
- Egypt
- South Africa
- Nigeria
- Jordan
- Tunisia
- Turkey
- Lebanon
- Morocco
- Thailand

=== Radio and television production ===
Procter & Gamble produced and sponsored the first radio serial dramas in the 1930s. As the company was known for Ivory soap, the serials became known as "soap operas". With the rise of television in the 1950s and 1960s, most of the new serials were sponsored, produced and owned (20 series) by the company (including The Guiding Light, which had begun as a radio serial, and made the transition to television lasting 72 years). The end of As the World Turns in 2010 resulted in the company's absence from the soap opera genre for almost fifteen years, which lasted until Beyond the Gates (a co-production with CBS Studios and the NAACP) premiered on CBS in 2025. The Young and the Restless, produced by Sony Pictures Television and also broadcast on CBS, is also partially sponsored by Procter & Gamble. Procter & Gamble also produced the vertical drama series The Golden Pear Affair to promote their Native line of personal care products.

These past serials were produced by Procter & Gamble:

- Another World
- As the World Turns
- The Brighter Day
- The Catlins
- The Edge of Night
- The First Hundred Years
- From These Roots
- Guiding Light
- Lovers and Friends / For Richer, for Poorer
- Our Private World
- Search for Tomorrow
- Somerset
- Texas
- Young Doctor Malone

Procter & Gamble also was the first company to produce and sponsor a prime-time serial, a 1965 spin-off of As the World Turns called Our Private World. In 1979, PGP produced Shirley, a prime-time NBC series starring Shirley Jones, which lasted 13 episodes. They also produced TBS' first original comedy series, Down to Earth, which ran from 1984 to 1987 (110 episodes were produced). They also distributed the syndicated comedy series Throb. In 1985, they produced a game-show pilot called The Buck Stops Here with Taft Entertainment Television in 1985, hosted by Jim Peck; it was not picked up. Procter & Gamble Productions originally co-produced Dawson's Creek with Columbia TriStar Television but withdrew before the series premiere due to early press reviews. They also produced the 1991 TV movie A Triumph of the Heart: The Ricky Bell Story, which was co-produced by The Landsburg Company, and it continued to produce the People's Choice Awards until the show was sold to E! channel in April 2017. In 2007, PGP teamed up with the now-defunct Cookie Jar Group to produce the Flash-animated children's series Will and Dewitt, which featured the character Dewitt, the mascot for the Pampers baby product line's former sub-brand, Kandoo.

With Walmart, PGP sponsored Family Movie Night on broadcast networks in 2010–2011 and Walden Family Theater on the Hallmark Channel in 2013.

In 2013, PGP rebranded itself as Procter & Gamble Entertainment (PGE) with a new logo and an emphasis on multiple-platform entertainment production.

P&G funded a six-episode series, Activate, on National Geographic in 2019 focusing on extreme poverty, inequality and sustainability in conjunction with not-for-profit Global Citizen and production company Radical Media. The company agreed to a longform series deal with Stone Village Television in January 2020. In February 2020, P&G joined Imagine Documentaries' five project slate including Mars 2080, the project closest to production.

=== Sponsorships ===
In addition to its self-produced items through PGE, Procter & Gamble also supports many Spanish-language novellas through advertising on all networks: Azteca América, Estrella TV, Galavisión, Telemundo, UniMás and Univisión. P&G was one of the first mainstream advertisers on Spanish-language TV during the mid-1980s. By the late 1990s, P&G was established as the largest advertiser on Spanish-language media.

In 2008, P&G expanded into music sponsorship when it joined Island Def Jam to create Tag Records, named after a body spray that P&G acquired from Gillette. In 2010, after the cancellation of As the World Turns, PGP announced it was phasing out soap opera production and expanding into more family-appropriate programming.

Procter & Gamble also gave a $100,000 contract to the winners of Cycles 1 through 3 of Canada's Next Top Model, wherein Andrea Muizelaar, Rebecca Hardy, and Meaghan Waller won the prize.

Procter & Gamble has been a major sponsor of the Summer Olympics since 2012. It sponsored 150 athletes at the London games that year. They have also sponsored the Winter Olympics since 2014, continuing the "Thanks Mom" program started in 2010 with figure skater Kristi Yamaguchi and expanding it not only to American athletes such as sky racer Lindsey Vonn but also Russian ice hockey players Alexander Ovechkin and Evgeni Malkin, German long track speed skater Sven Kramer and Japanese figure skaters Daisuke Takahashi and Yuzuru Hanyu. It will do so at the 2028 Summer Olympics in Los Angeles, California, besides the 2030 Winter Olympics in French Alps. The company's sponsorship includes television ads in which Olympic athletes are portrayed as children to convey the sense that the mothers of these athletes still remember them as infants; other ads stress how Olympic mothers stood by their children through years of training all the way through to Olympic success. 2016's ad for the Rio Games notes upheavals as youths by an American gymnast, Chinese swimmer, Brazilian volleyballer, and German distance runner. The ads all make prominent use of the Ludovico Einaudi orchestral track "Divenire" and related such instrumentals.

The company has actively developed or sponsored numerous online communities, e.g. BeingGirl.com (launched in 2000) and Women.com. As of 2000, the company had 72 "highly stylized destination sites".

In October 2026, P&G was signed as a sponsor of McLaren Formula 1 Team.

== Controversies ==
=== Toxic shock syndrome and tampons ===
Toxic shock syndrome (TSS) is a disease caused by strains of the bacteria Staphylococcus aureus. Most people have these bacteria living in their bodies as harmless commensals in places such as the nose, skin, and vagina. The disease can strike anyone, not only women, but the disease is often associated with tampons. In 1980, 814 menstrual-related TSS cases were reported; 38 deaths resulted from the disease. The majority of women in these cases were documented as using super-absorbent synthetic tampons, particularly the Rely tampon created by Procter & Gamble. Unlike other tampons made of cotton and rayon, Rely used carboxymethylcellulose and compressed beads of polyester for absorption.

In the summer of 1980, the Centers for Disease Control released a report explaining how these bacterial mechanisms were leading to TSS. They also stated that the Rely tampon was associated with TSS more than any other brand of tampon. In September 1980, Procter & Gamble voluntarily recalled its Rely brand of tampons from the market. Since the 1980s, reported cases of TSS have dramatically decreased.

=== Other products ===
In 2002, P&G was sued for its ads falsely suggesting to the consumers that the drug Prilosec could cure heartburn in a day. In December 2005, the Pharmaceutical division of P&G was involved in a dispute over research involving its osteoporosis drug Actonel. The case was discussed in the media.

=== Animal testing ===
Procter & Gamble has received criticism from animal advocacy group PETA for the practice of testing on animals.

On June 30, 1999, Procter & Gamble announced that it would limit its animal testing practices to its food and drug products which represented less than 20% of its product portfolio. The company invested more than $275 million in the development of alternative testing methods.

=== Price fixing ===
In April 2011, P&G was fined €211.2 million by the European Commission for establishing a price-fixing cartel for washing powder in Europe along with Unilever, which was fined €104 million, and Henkel. Though the fine was set higher at first, it was discounted by 10% after P&G and Unilever admitted running the cartel. As the provider of the tip-off leading to investigations, Henkel was not fined.

=== Child labor and forced labor ===
According to a 2016 report by Amnesty International, palm oil provider Wilmar International, the world's biggest palm oil grower in 2016 and supplier of raw materials to Procter & Gamble, profited from 8 to 14-year-old child labor and forced labor. Some workers were extorted, threatened, or not paid for work. Some workers also suffered severe injuries from toxic banned chemicals.

=== Reverse domain name hijacking ===
In March 2013, P&G was found by a World Intellectual Property Organization panel to have engaged in reverse domain hijacking in an attempt to obtain the domain name "swash.com" from Marchex in a Uniform Domain-Name Dispute-Resolution Policy proceeding. P&G originally stated it had generated more than $40 million in sales of its Swash laundry products over four years, a figure it later revised to $60,000. After losing the case P&G purchased the domain name from Marchex. In 2013 attorney John Berryhill suggested that P&G did not intend to use the swash.com domain to market its existing range, as it had said, but rather a new product described in a 2011 trademark application as "An appliance for domestic use in the nature of a garment steamer for the purpose of removing wrinkles and odors from clothing and linen". Berryhill's theory was shown to be accurate after swash.com went live in June 2014.

=== "The Talk" ===
In 2017, as part of the "My Black is Beautiful" platform, P&G released an advertisement called "The Talk". It showed African American mothers throughout the decades giving their children "the talk" about racism. The advertisement garnered controversy for several different reasons. Some criticized it for not showing any fathers giving "the talk", while others accused it of being anti-white. One scene depicted a mother warning her daughter about being pulled over by the police. The daughter responds by saying that she is a good driver so her mother doesn't need to worry about her getting a ticket. The mother then implies that she might experience police brutality by being racially profiled and killed. Several police officers and groups accused that part of the advertisement of being anti-cop.

"The Talk" was accused by Michelle Malkin of National Review of being "liberal advertising". Malkin also called the ad "Black Lives Matter propaganda" and accused it of pandering and using identity politics. Despite the criticism, the advertisement also received a lot of positive reception and praise with some calling it "powerful" and "thought-provoking". The advertisement has also won several awards including the 2018 Cannes Lions International Festival of Creativity Grand Prix and the 2018 Primetime Emmy Award for Outstanding Commercial during the 70th Primetime Creative Arts Emmy Awards.

=== Social stances ===
The company has been criticized for its social stances, some of which were criticized for being "woke".

In November 2014, P&G came out publicly in support of same-sex marriage.

In January 2019, CEO David Taylor said in Switzerland: "The world would be a better place if my board of directors on down is represented by 50% of the women. We sell our products to more than 50% of the women." Also in January 2019, The Wall Street Journal noted the company's board of directors had more than twice as many men as it does women. As of mid-2020, the board of P&G consisted of an equal number of men and women.

In 2025, the company continued its policies of diversity, equity, and inclusion despite government scrutiny during the second presidency of Donald Trump.

==== Gillette advertisement ====
On January 14, 2019, P&G subsidiary Gillette released a controversial advertisement, "The Best Men Can Be", ostensibly to address negative behavior among men, including bullying, sexism, sexual misconduct, and toxic masculinity. The ad was the subject of controversy and was received negatively by various online commentators, becoming one of the most disliked videos on YouTube.

The ad led to calls for boycott of Gillette and Procter & Gamble. Later in the year, its Gillette shaving business took an $8 billion write-down in value, although the company and analysts pointed to accumulated currency fluctuations, the entrance of strong rivals and decline in the demand for shaving products since the division's previous valuation in 2005, rather than fallout from the ad.

=== Trade in Russia amid Ukraine war ===
The Ukrainian National Agency for Prevention of Corruption (NACP) placed P&G on the list of International Sponsors of War for the 2022 Russian invasion of Ukraine. P&G has two factories operating in Russia (the Gillette razor manufacturing plant in Saint Petersburg and a toiletries manufacturing plant in Tula Oblast), thus contributing to the Russian federal budget and financing Russian war crimes according to the NACP. It was placed on the list alongside Bacardi and Unilever. In 2022, the company's revenue amounted to 108 billion rubles.

== Misinformation and conspiracy theories ==
=== Logo myth and Satanism accusations ===
Former P&G logo, which was accused of being a Satanist symbol. In 1989, its details were simplified, to avoid further unfounded accusations. Still used on the bottom of P&G boxes.

P&G's former logo originated in 1851 as a crude cross that barge workers on the Ohio River painted on cases of P&G star candles to identify them. P&G later changed this symbol into a trademark that showed a man in the moon overlooking 13 stars, said to commemorate the original Thirteen Colonies.

The company received unwanted media publicity in the 1980s due to rumors, spread largely by Amway distributors, that the moon-and-stars logo was a satanic symbol. The accusation was based on a passage in the Bible, Revelation 12:1, which states: "Now a great sign appeared in heaven: a woman clothed with the sun, with the moon under her feet, and on her head a garland of twelve stars." Some claimed that the logo was a mockery of the heavenly symbol alluded to in the aforementioned verse, thus construing the logo to be satanic. Where the flowing beard meets the surrounding circle, three abstracted curls were said to be a mirror image of the number 666, or the number of the beast. At the top and bottom, the hair curls in on itself and was said to be the horns like those of a ram.

These interpretations have been denied by company officials, and no evidence linking the company to the Church of Satan or any occult organization has ever been presented. The company unsuccessfully sued Amway from 1995 to 2003 over rumors forwarded through a company voicemail system in 1995. In 2007, the company successfully sued individual Amway distributors for reviving and propagating the false rumors. The Church of Satan denies being supported by Procter & Gamble.

P&G simplified details of the logo in 1991. The moon-and-stars logo was completely replaced by a text-only logo in 1995 in a failed attempt to quash the conspiracy theory. In 2013, it unveiled a new logo with a hint of a crescent moon behind the text.
