= Dennis Weatherby =

American scientist (1959–2007)

- Born: December 4, 1959; Brighton, Alabama, USA
- Died: September 15, 2007 (aged 47); Alexandria, Kentucky, USA
- Spouse: Marpessa Weatherby
- Children: 4 daughters Audrey, Elaine, Rachel and Antoneanitgah; two sons, Ryan and Stephen

Dennis W. Weatherby, Ph.D. (December 4, 1959 – September 15, 2007) was an inventor, scientist, university administrator, and proponent of minority college students' success.

While working for Procter & Gamble in the 1980s, Weatherby patented lemon-scented Cascade, a detergent with a new chemical formula that would not stain dishes, unlike the detergents of the previous decade. As the founding director of Auburn University's Minority Engineering Program, he made Auburn one of the top universities for graduating African Americans in the field of engineering.

== Early life ==
Weatherby was born December 4, 1959, in Brighton, Alabama the son of Willie and Flossie Mae Weatherby. He attended Midfield High School and then attended Central State University in Wilberforce, Ohio, where he graduated with a bachelor's degree in chemistry in 1982. From there, he moved to the University of Dayton where he completed a master's degree in chemical engineering in 1984. Soon after finishing his studies, Weatherby began working for Procter & Gamble in Cincinnati, Ohio, as a process engineer.

== Career ==
With his team, Weatherby developed a solution that employed a category of dyes that could be used in products containing bleach and, at the same time, would give the soap a lemon-yellow color that would not stain dishes. Before his invention, pigments were used in such solutions that often stained dishes and dishwasher interiors. With fellow inventor Brian J. Roselle, he received U.S. patent No. 4,714,562, issued on December 22, 1987, for his breakthrough "Automatic dishwasher detergent composition." The solution serves as the basic formula behind all of today's "lemon-scented" cleaning products containing bleach.

Following his stint with P&G, Weatherby briefly worked for the Whittaker Corporation, a division of Morton International. Then, in 1989, he began working for his alma mater, CSU, as an academic advisor and recruiter in the water resources center. According to the school, which has historically catered to black students, under Weatherby's leadership the program experienced a more than 400 percent growth in student enrollment with a better than 80 percent retention rate. In 1994 he became an assistant professor of water quality at CSU in its International Center for Water Resources Management. He also served as the primary recruiter, advisor and counselor for students in the environmental program at CSU.

In 1996, Weatherby moved on to the institution where he had completed his graduate studies, Auburn University, to become director of the school's new minority engineering program. There he served as a role model and advisor for black and other young minority men and women and also chaired external programs such as an undergraduate science symposium for showcasing students' research from six area colleges and universities. An MEP (Minority Engineering Program) report stated that minority first-year freshman pre-engineering students involved in the program in 1998–99 had a mean grad-point average over their first three academic quarters of 2.70. Nearly 79 percent of the participants had GPAs equal to or better than the 2.20 required to begin taking engineering courses. By comparison, white first year freshman pre-engineering students had a mean GPA after three quarters of 2.56 and just below 70 percent had the required 2.20 GPA. Weatherby left Auburn to become an associate dean of the graduate school at the University of Notre Dame in 2004. In 2006, he became the Associate Provost for Student Success at Northern Kentucky University, which he served until his death in September 2007.

== Death ==
Weatherby died from what doctors speculate was a blood clot that had traveled to his brain. After struggling with high blood pressure most of his life, his kidneys sustained severe damage. Weatherby spent a week in the hospital and a week at home on medication to lower his blood pressure. He was 47 when he died. According to one of his daughters, Audrey Weatherby, during his time at home he hit his foot on a bedpost. Doctors believe a clot formed and eventually caused his death.
