= James Gamble (industrialist) =

Irish-American industrialist (1803–1891)

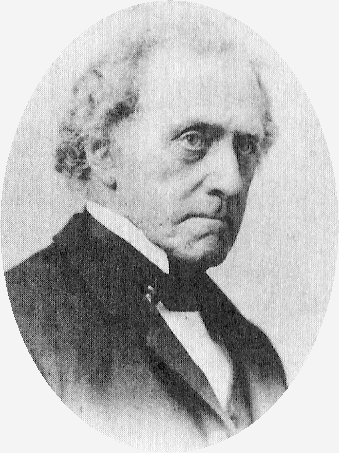
- Gamble, c. 1890
- Born: 3 April 1803; Enniskillen, Ireland
- Died: 29 April 1891 (aged 88); Cincinnati, Ohio, US
- Occupations: Soapmaker, industrialist co-founder of Procter & Gamble
- Relatives: William Procter (brother-in-law)

James Gamble (3 April 1803 – 29 April 1891) was an Irish-American soap industrialist. He was the co-founder of Procter & Gamble Company in 1837, along with his brother-in-law English candlemaker William Procter.

== Early life ==
Gamble was born on 3 April 1803, at the Graan near Enniskillen in County Fermanagh, Ireland, and went to Portora Royal School. His father George Gamble, who was a Methodist minister, decided with his family to escape the depression in Ireland. They emigrated to the United States in 1819. The Gambles arrived in Cincinnati, Ohio, on a flat boat down the Ohio River destined for Illinois. His family stopped in Cincinnati when he was seized with an illness. Staying in the city, his father established a nursery and Gamble apprenticed as a soap maker. Cincinnati then was a major pig-butchering center and produced large amount of pig fat used for making candles and soap. He attended Kenyon College and manufactured soap on his own in 1828.

== Procter & Gamble ==
Gamble went into business with William Procter after they became related by marriage. Gamble's wife Elizabeth Ann Norris was the sister of Procter's wife Olivia Norris. The pair's father-in-law, Alexander Norris, first suggested that the two go into business together in 1837 and consequently Procter & Gamble was born. Within 20 years, the company had a $1-million turnover. It also secured a contract to supply soap for the Union Army.

== Death ==
Gamble died at his residence in Cincinnati on 29 April 1891 from natural causes. He is interred in Spring Grove Cemetery in Cincinnati.

Procter, who preceded his partner Gamble in death, is also buried at Spring Grove Cemetery.

== Family life ==
Gamble and Elizabeth Ann (née Norris) Gamble had ten children, including James Norris Gamble (9 August 1836 – 2 July 1932) who became Vice President of Procter & Gamble and was the chemist who devised the formula for Ivory soap. James Norris Gamble married Margaret Penrose; he died in his sleep on 2 July 1932 in Cincinnati and is interred in Spring Grove Cemetery. Another son, David Gamble, built the Gamble House in Pasadena, California.

Gamble's grandson, William, married Franzeska Wilhelmina (née Fanny) Nast, the daughter of clergyman William. Fanny was the first woman to graduate from German Wallace College in Berea, Ohio. As one of Cincinnati's biggest proponents of Methodism, Gamble was a prominent member of Westwood Methodist Church and donated money to construct Methodist churches throughout Greater Cincinnati.
