= Cascade (brand) =

Brand of dishwasher detergent owned by Procter & Gamble

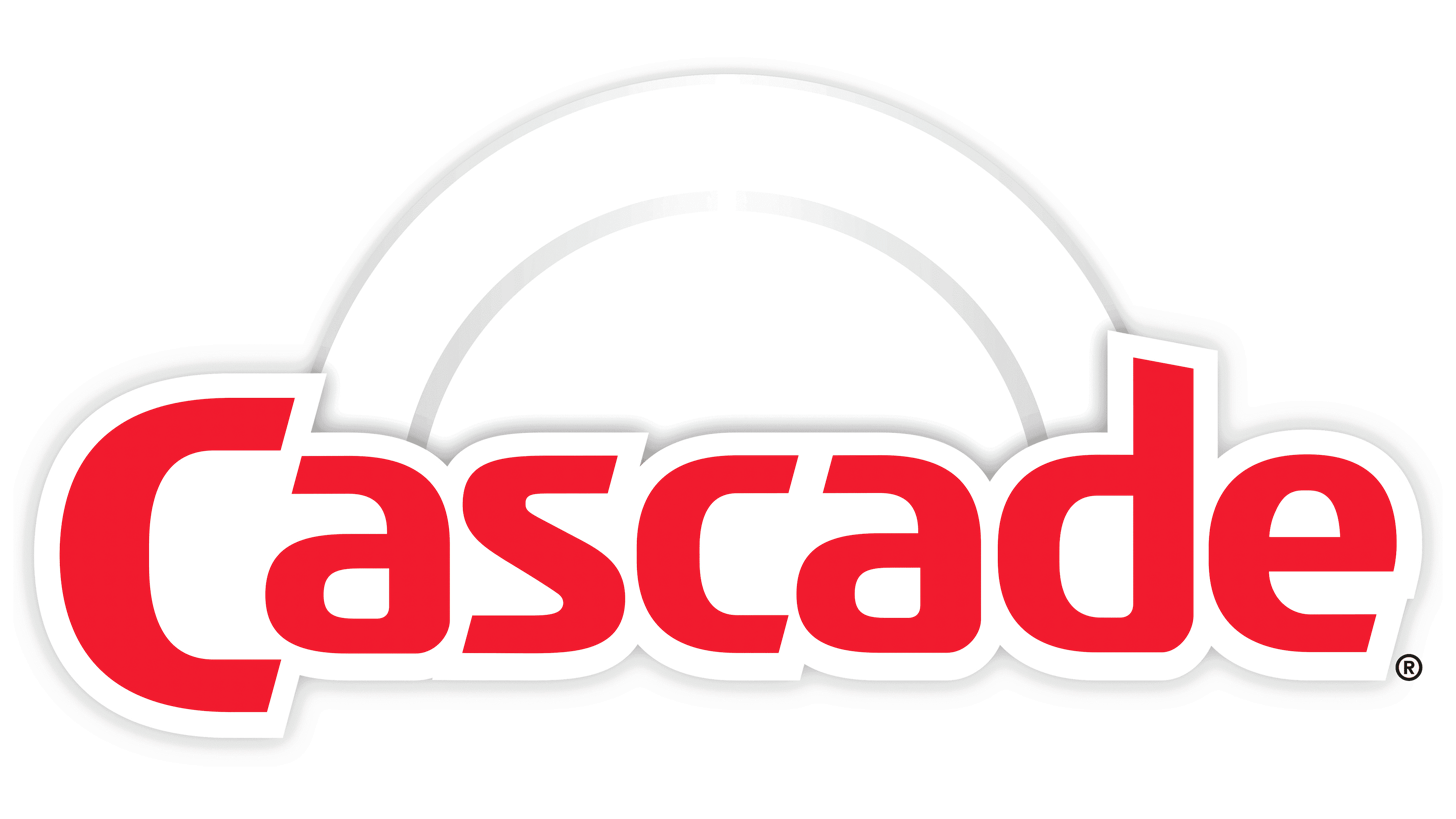
- Product type: Dishwasher detergent
- Current owner: Procter & Gamble
- Country: United States
- Introduced: 1955; 71 years ago
- Website: cascadeclean.com

Cascade is a brand of automatic dishwasher detergent manufactured by Procter & Gamble. Introduced in 1955, it is the most popular dishwasher detergent brand in the United States.

== History ==
Cascade was developed by Procter & Gamble in 1955 as a specialized product for automatic dishwashers. Its creation stemmed from a business decision to differentiate the company's cleaning products. Before Cascade, the company had marketed Tide as a multi‑purpose detergent, including for dishwashing, but found Tide powder did not leave dishes sufficiently shiny. The company identified a market for a product specifically formulated for increasingly popular automatic dishwashers.

The brand's formulation has evolved over time. A patent for an "automatic dishwasher detergent composition" that became part of the Cascade brand was granted to Procter & Gamble chemists Dennis Weatherby and Brian J. Roselle. The patent, issued on December 22, 1987, described a formula that included a class of dyes to give the detergent a lemon-yellow color without staining dishware and the dishwasher interior.

In August 2003, Procter & Gamble launched Cascade ActionPacs, a line of unit-dose detergent pods. The pods utilized two-compartment packets composed of water-soluble polyvinyl alcohol (PVA) film, designed to sequester liquid and solid ingredients until dissolution during the wash cycle. In 2010, Cascade reformulated their products to remove phosphates (such as sodium tripolyphosphate) in response to environmental regulation and concerns about eutrophication of waterways.

== Products ==
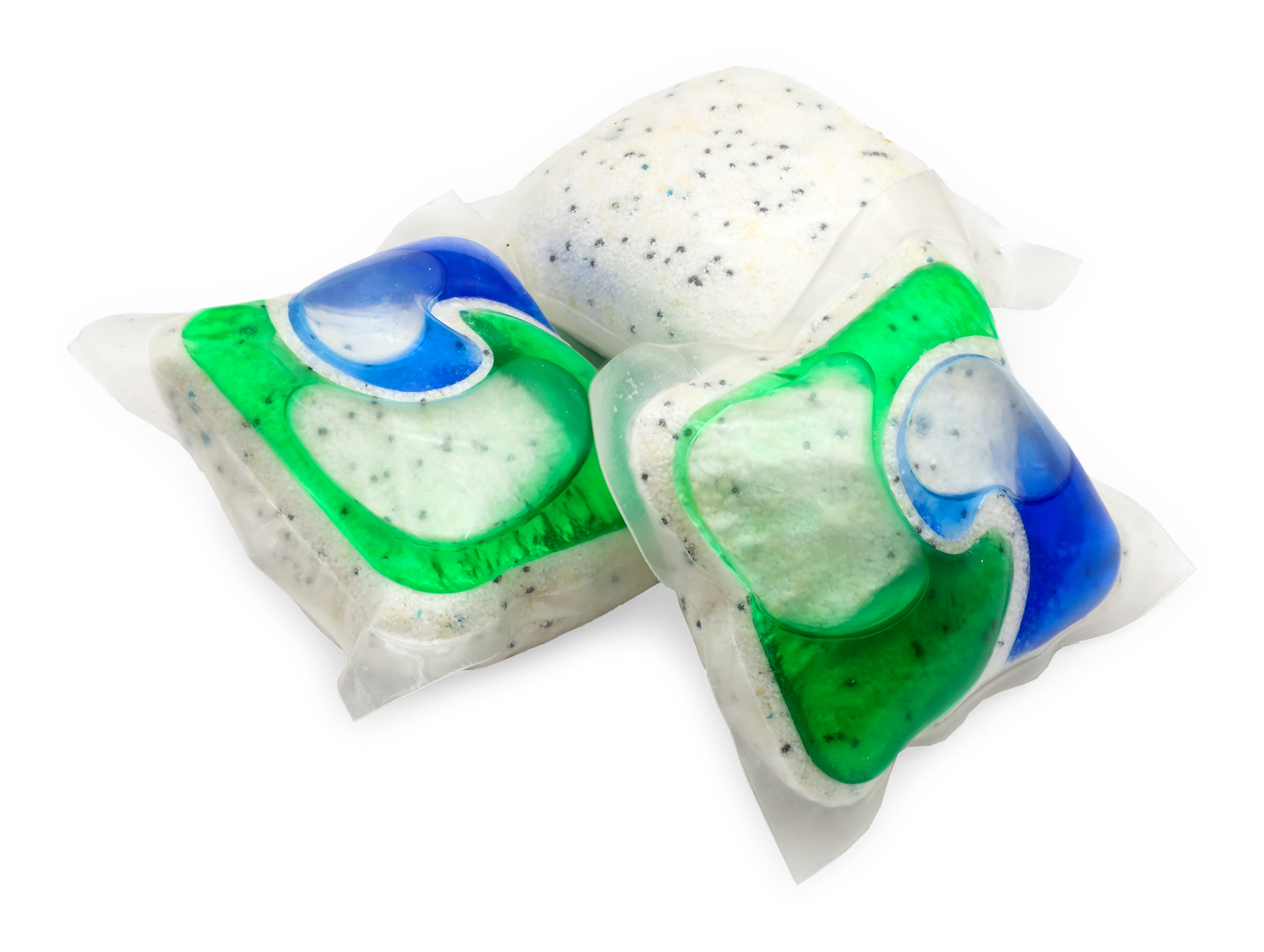
Cascade ActionPac dishwasher pods

As of 2026, Cascade markets the following products in the US:

- ActionPacs (Single-Dose Pods)
  - Platinum Plus
  - Platinum
  - Complete
  - Free & Clear
- Gel Detergent
  - Platinum Gel
  - Complete Gel
  - Free & Clear Gel
- Powder Detergent
  - Complete Powder
- Additives & Machine Care
  - Power Dry Rinse Aid
  - Dishwasher Cleaner
