= Procter & Gamble Pakistan =

Former Pakistani subsidiary of Procter & Gamble

Procter & Gamble Pakistan (P&G)
- Native name: پروکٹر اینڈ گیمبل پاکستان
- Type: Subsidiary
- Industry: Consumer goods
- Founded: August 1991; 35 years ago
- Defunct: 2025
- Headquarters: Dolmen Mall, Clifton, Karachi-75600, Sindh, Pakistan
- Net income: ▲ Rs. 4.996 billion (US$18 million) (2020)
- Number of employees: ~1000 (2008)
- Parent: Procter & Gamble
- Website: pg.com/en_pk/

Procter & Gamble (P&G) Pakistan was a Pakistani consumer goods company based in Karachi. It was a subsidiary of American multinational company Procter & Gamble.

P&G operated in fabric care, baby care, hair care, feminine care, beauty and personal care, oral care and healthcare sectors in Pakistan.

== History ==
Procter & Gamble (P&G) Pakistan was founded in August 1991 as a subsidiary of Procter & Gamble.

In 1994, P&G acquired a soap-manufacturing facility at Hub, Balochistan and began production of Safeguard soaps in Pakistan. In 2002, P&G tripled its soap manufacturing capacity with an additional investment of US$3 million.

In 2004, P&G began manufacturing PuR water purifier in its Hub, Balochistan plant. The plant had a production capacity of 50 million sachets annually.

In December 2010, P&G commissioned its Bin Qasim plant in Karachi. In 2019, P&G made an additional investment of US$50 million to produce hair care products such as Pantene and Head & Shoulders at its Port Qasim plant in Karachi.

In September 2024, P&G sold its Hub soap manufacturing plant to Nimir Industrial Chemicals Limited.

In October 2025, P&G discontinued its operations in Pakistan and sold its manufacturing facility.

=== Timeline ===
- Olay (1992)
- Head & Shoulders (1992)
- Gillette (1993)
- Pantene (1995)
- Safeguard (1996)
- Ariel (1998)
- Pampers (2000)
- Always (2001)

== Plants ==
P&G operated a plant in Bin Qasim Port, Karachi and in Hub, Balochistan before exiting Pakistan in 2025.

== Brands ==
- Duracell
- Downy
- Ariel
  - Ariel Original
  - Ariel Downy
  - Ariel Machine Expert
- Braun
- Safeguard
- Pantene
  - Pantene Nature Fusion
  - Pantene 2in1
  - Pantene Oil Replacement
- Head & Shoulders
  - Head & Shoulders 2in1
- Oral B
- Olay
- Pampers
  - Pampers Pants
  - Pampers Active Baby
  - Pampers Premium Care
  - Pampers Wipes
- Always
  - Always Dreamzzz
  - Always Platinum
  - Always Diamond
- Gillette
  - Gillette Mach3
  - Gillette Mach3 Sensitive
  - Gillette Mach3 Start
  - Gillette Mach3 Turbo
  - Gillette Mach3 Turbo Victory
  - Gillette Mach3 Turbo Champion
  - Gillette 2
  - Gillette Blue2
  - Gillette Blue2 Plus
  - Gillette Blue3
  - Gillette Blue3 Flexi
  - Gillette Blue3 Simple
  - Gillette Body
  - Gillette Fusion
  - Gillette Guard
  - Gillette Venus
  - Gillette Vector Plus
  - Gillette Series
  - Gillette Skinguard
  - Gillette 7'o Clock
- Vicks
  - Vicks Vaporub
- Camay
- Herbal Essences
- Wella
- Pert Plus

== Defunct operations ==
In October 2025, P&G announced that it would close its manufacturing and commercial operations in Pakistan, including its subsidiary Gillette Pakistan Ltd., as part of the company’s global restructuring. Under the plan, P&G will shift to a third-party distribution model to continue serving Pakistani consumers, meaning that instead of local production and direct sales, independent distributors will import and market P&G brands in the country.

The company said the exit would be done in an orderly manner over several months, during which it would continue to operate “in the normal course.” It also said that affected employees would be considered for roles in other P&G operations outside Pakistan or offered severance packages in accordance with local laws and company policy.

Gillette Pakistan also indicated that it would consider delisting from the Pakistan Stock Exchange as part of the business closure process and emphasized that despite the operational winddown, its products (such as Pampers, Ariel, Head & Shoulders, Pantene, Always, Safeguard, Olay, Oral-B, Vicks) will continue to be available in Pakistan through regional operations and third parties.

- may 2026
