= Josephus C. Vines =

American politician

Mayor of Brighton, Alabama
- In office 1905 – June 1, 1906
- Preceded by: L. W. Buell
- Succeeded by: E. B. Knight

Personal details
- Born: July 10, 1873 Jefferson County, Alabama, U.S.
- Died: July 19, 1964 (aged 91) Orlando, Florida, U.S.
- Resting place: Brighton Cemetery
- Party: Prohibition
- Spouse: 4
- Children: 7
- Parents: Robert A. W. Vines (father); Cornelia Carrie Stephens (mother)

Josephus C. Vines (July 10, 1873 – July 19, 1964) was an American politician who served as the mayor of Brighton, Alabama as a member of the Prohibition Party. In 1955, he faced legal trouble after killing a man, but was not indicted by a grand jury.

== Early life ==
Josephus C. Vines was born in Jefferson County, Alabama on July 10, 1873, to Robert A. W. Vines and Cornelia Carrie Stephens. On October 12, 1898, he married Anges Loftus and following her death he would remarry three more times during which he had seven children. In 1900, he successfully applied for a teaching certificate in Jefferson County along with six other people out of thirty six applicants who applied during the March examinations.

== Politics ==
During the 1900s he served as mayor of Brighton for two or three terms. In 1905, he defeated incumbent Mayor L. W. Buell by two votes. Although it was speculated that Vines would run for reelection he stated on March 31, 1906, that he would not seek another term and on June 1, his term ended after he gave the oath of office to his successor, E. B. Knight.

== Murder and later life ==
On July 16, 1955, Vines found Tim Scott, a bookkeeper, drinking on his doorstep in Orlando, Florida and claimed to have accidentally shot and killed him intending to bluff him believing that his .32 revolver was empty. He pleaded innocent to charges of first-degree murder and had a civil suit filed against him by Edward Hanlon on behalf of Davis Lou Scott, Tim Scott's wife, for $126,412.48. He was released on a $10,000 bond and on October 13, the Orange County Circuit Court Grand Jury chose to not indict Vines.

In November 1955, he was hit by a truck and was later hospitalized for a possible heart condition in December. On July 19, 1964, Vines died in Orlando, Florida where he had lived since 1937.

== Electoral history ==
1905 Brighton, Alabama mayoral election
Party	Candidate	Votes	%
Prohibition	Josephus C. Vines	39	52.70%
Democratic	L. W. Buell	35	47.30%
Total votes		74	100.00%
