= Brighton, Alabama =

City in Alabama, United States

Brighton
- City
- Location of Brighton in Jefferson County, Alabama.
- Coordinates: 33°26′22″N 86°56′43″W
- Country: United States
- State: Alabama
- County: Jefferson
- Named for: Brighton, England

Area
  - Total: 1.41 sq mi (3.66 km^{2})
  - Land: 1.41 sq mi (3.66 km^{2})
  - Water: 0 sq mi (0.00 km^{2})
- Elevation: 515 ft (157 m)

Population (2020)
  - Total: 2,337
  - Density: 1,651.9/sq mi (637.81/km^{2})
- Time zone: UTC-6 (Central (CST))
  - Summer (DST): UTC-5 (CDT)
- ZIP code: 35020
- Area codes: 205 & 659
- FIPS code: 01-09400
- GNIS feature ID: 2403925
- Website: https://brightonal.org/

Brighton is a city near Birmingham, Alabama, United States and located just east of Hueytown. At the 2020 census, the population was 2,337. It is part of the Birmingham-Hoover Metropolitan Statistical Area, which in 2010 had a population of about 1,128,047, approximately one-quarter of Alabama's population.

It is one of four cities in Jefferson County named after cities in Great Britain. Many of the city's early settlers were of English descent; they named the town after the English tourist and resort city of Brighton, which is located on the English Channel.

== Geography ==
According to the U.S. Census Bureau, the city has a total area of 1.4 square miles (3.6 km^{2}), all land.

== History ==
Brighton was not settled by European Americans until the late 19th century. Brighton was officially founded in 1892, when developer G.B. Edwards subdivided a tract of land and sold lots. It was named after Brighton in East Sussex, a ceremonial county in southern England. It was situated along a dummy railroad line built in 1889 by the Bessemer & Birmingham Railroad Company to connect those two growing industrial cities.

The Old Huntsville Road was renamed as Main Street and the city was incorporated in 1901. By that year, at least 100 families were living in Brighton. The town had a population of 1,502 by the 1910 census, with seventeen commercial establishments, including eight grocery stores.

The city's fortunes have been closely linked to those of Woodward Iron Company. Together with coal mining in this area, the iron company was integral to the industrial development in this part of Alabama, which is based on the much larger cities of Birmingham, Bessemer, and Gadsden. After industrial restructuring in the late 1970s and when the iron company moved out, the town has declined in population since its peak in 1980.

Brighton Cemetery, which is still operating, contains the graves of persons of Scottish, English and German descent who came to work at Woodward.

In August 1908, coal miner and union leader William Miller, who was black, was accused of blowing up the home of a white mine operator Finley Fuller. It was during a period of labor unrest as mine workers tried to organize unions. Miller was lynched by a white mob that dragged him out of the Brighton jail. They hanged and killed him not far from Brighton City Hall. Later, it was found that whites opposed to unionization had bombed Fuller's home; by linking the crime to a black man, they intended to increase general opposition to the union's drive for better wages.

In 2015, after the Equal Justice Initiative (EJI) published its study Lynching in America: Confronting the Legacy of Racial Terror, the city of Brighton resolved to place a historical marker to commemorate Miller for his work with the union and as a victim of lynching. They worked in cooperation with EJI and placed the marker in a ceremony near City Hall. Brighton was the first city in Alabama to install such a memorial. In a related effort, scholarships will be awarded to high school students for writing essays about Alabama's racial history.

== City government ==
Brighton has a Mayor–council government. It operates both police and fire departments.

== Demographics ==
Historical population
Census	Pop.	Note	%±
1910	1,502		—
1920	3,665		144.0%
1930	1,708		−53.4%
1940	1,377		−19.4%
1950	1,689		22.7%
1960	2,884		70.8%
1970	2,277		−21.0%
1980	5,308		133.1%
1990	4,518		−14.9%
2000	3,640		−19.4%
2010	2,945		−19.1%
2020	2,337		−20.6%
U.S. Decennial Census; 2013 Estimate

=== Racial and ethnic composition ===
Brighton city, Alabama – Racial and ethnic composition Note: the US Census treats Hispanic/Latino as an ethnic category. This table excludes Latinos from the racial categories and assigns them to a separate category. Hispanics/Latinos may be of any race.
Race / Ethnicity (NH = Non-Hispanic)	Pop 1980	Pop 1990	Pop 2000	Pop 2010	Pop 2020	% 1980	% 1990	% 2000	% 2010	% 2020
White alone (NH)	744	595	311	137	81	14.02%	13.17%	8.54%	4.65%	3.47%
Black or African American alone (NH)	4,523	3,902	3,230	2,376	1,805	85.21%	86.37%	88.74%	80.68%	77.24%
Native American or Alaska Native alone (NH)	0	2	10	7	3	0.00%	0.04%	0.27%	0.24%	0.13%
Asian alone (NH)	0	12	1	0	5	0.00%	0.27%	0.03%	0.00%	0.21%
Native Hawaiian or Pacific Islander alone (NH)	x	x	1	0	0	x	x	0.03%	0.00%	0.00%
Other race alone (NH)	4	1	4	3	4	0.08%	0.02%	0.11%	0.10%	0.17%
Mixed race or Multiracial (NH)	x	x	20	15	41	x	x	0.55%	0.51%	1.75%
Hispanic or Latino (any race)	37	6	63	407	398	0.70%	0.13%	1.73%	13.82%	17.03%
Total	5,308	4,518	3,640	2,945	2,337	100.00%	100.00%	100.00%	100.00%	100.00%

=== 2020 census ===
As of the 2020 census, Brighton had a population of 2,337. The median age was 42.3 years. 21.7% of residents were under the age of 18 and 21.1% of residents were 65 years of age or older. For every 100 females there were 92.7 males, and for every 100 females age 18 and over there were 92.0 males age 18 and over.

100.0% of residents lived in urban areas, while 0.0% lived in rural areas.

There were 1,000 households and 519 families in Brighton; 26.9% had children under the age of 18 living in them. Of all households, 18.2% were married-couple households, 29.0% were households with a male householder and no spouse or partner present, and 47.2% were households with a female householder and no spouse or partner present. About 39.9% of all households were made up of individuals and 18.4% had someone living alone who was 65 years of age or older.

There were 1,165 housing units, of which 14.2% were vacant. The homeowner vacancy rate was 1.1% and the rental vacancy rate was 6.2%.

=== 2010 census ===
At the 2010 census, there were 2,945 people, 1,105 households, and 696 families living in the city. The population density was 789.3 inhabitants per square mile (304.8/km^{2}). There were 1,360 housing units at an average density of 971.4 per square mile (375.1/km^{2}). The racial makeup of the city was 81.0% Black or African American, 6.5% White, 1.0% Native American, 0.0% Asian, 0.0% Pacific Islander, 10.8% from other races, and 0.9% from two or more races. 13.8% of the population were Hispanic or Latino of any race.

Of the 1,105 households 21.7% had children under the age of 18 living with them, 24.6% were married couples living together, 31.9% had a female householder with no husband present, and 37.0% were non-families. 32.8% of households were one person and 12.4% were one person aged 65 or older. The average household size was 2.64 and the average family size was 3.39.

The age distribution was 22.8% under the age of 18, 11.5% from 18 to 24, 23.4% from 25 to 44, 27.2% from 45 to 64, and 15.1% 65 or older. The median age was 38 years. For every 100 females, there were 94.0 males. For every 100 females age 18 and over, there were 102.1 males.

The median household income was $25,929 and the median family income was $31,472. Males had a median income of $20,838 versus $28,250 for females. The per capita income for the city was $14,858. About 14.1% of families and 16.6% of the population were below the poverty line, including 19.6% of those under age 18 and 21.9% of those age 65 or over.

=== 2000 census ===
At the 2000 census, there were 3,640 people, 1,413 households, and 921 families living in the city. The population density was 2,599.1 inhabitants per square mile (1,003.5/km^{2}). There were 1,636 housing units at an average density of 1,168.2 per square mile (451.0/km^{2}). The racial makeup of the city was 9.01% White, 89.12% Black or African American, 0.38% Native American, 0.03% Asian, 0.03% Pacific Islander, 0.88% from other races, and 0.55% from two or more races. 1.73% of the population were Hispanic or Latino of any race.

Of the 1,413 households 25.9% had children under the age of 18 living with them, 29.9% were married couples living together, 29.9% had a female householder with no husband present, and 34.8% were non-families. 32.5% of households were one person and 14.7% were one person aged 65 or older. The average household size was 2.57 and the average family size was 3.29.

The age distribution was 25.5% under the age of 18, 10.3% from 18 to 24, 26.0% from 25 to 44, 21.8% from 45 to 64, and 16.3% 65 or older. The median age was 38 years. For every 100 females, there were 87.0 males. For every 100 females age 18 and over, there were 78.9 males.

The median household income was $21,364 and the median family income was $27,926. Males had a median income of $24,018 versus $20,192 for females. The per capita income for the city was $11,002. About 20.2% of families and 27.2% of the population were below the poverty line, including 38.3% of those under age 18 and 20.3% of those age 65 or over.

== Notable people ==
- Charles Avery (1892–1974), blues and boogie-woogie pianist
- Parnell Dickinson, former professional football player
- Albert Hall, stage, TV and film actor
- Henry Panion, music director for Stevie Wonder, Whitney Houston, and the Winans
- Josephus C. Vines, mayor of Brighton
- Dennis Weatherby, inventor, scientist, and university administrator
