= William Procter (industrialist) =

English-born American industrialist (1801–1884)

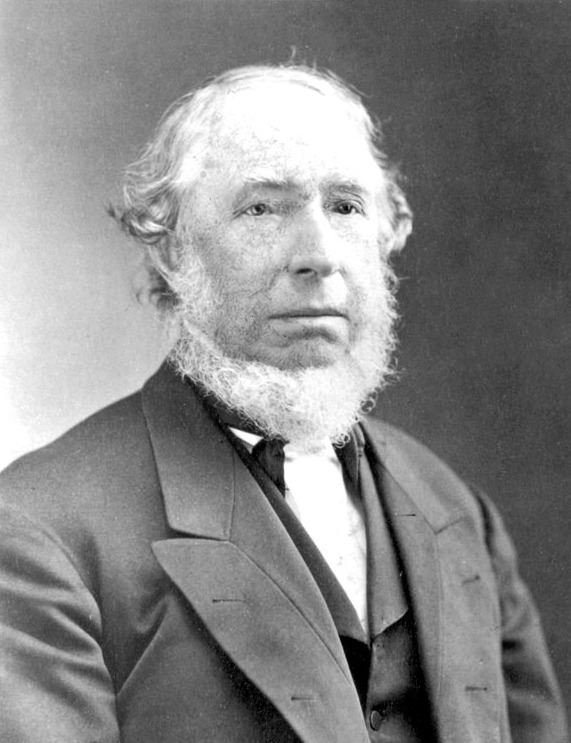
- Procter, c. 1890
- Born: 7 December 1801; Herefordshire, England
- Died: 4 April 1884 (aged 82); Cincinnati, Ohio, US
- Burial place: Spring Grove Cemetery; 39°09′52″N 84°31′22″W
- Occupations: Candlemaker, industrialist
- Known for: Co-founder of Procter & Gamble
- Children: 10

William Procter (7 December 1801 – 4 April 1884) was an English-born American industrialist and candlemaker who co-founded Procter & Gamble in 1837, along with James Gamble.

== Early life ==
Procter was born on 7 December 1801, in Herefordshire, and educated at Lucton School. He entered into business in 1818 and was connected with the clothing industry in London in the late 1820s. His store was robbed and he was later mired in huge amount of debt. In 1827, he became influenced by William Hooper, who by his admiration of America persuaded Procter to emigrate there. He arrived in the United States in 1830 and began to manufacture candles in New York City. He moved west with his first wife, Martha Peat Procter. She died during their westward journey in Cincinnati, Ohio, in 1832.

== Procter & Gamble ==
Planning only on staying for a short while before resuming his relocation plans, he decided to stay and spent the remainder of his life in Cincinnati. He started his business and, in 1833, married Olivia Norris, who was the daughter of a prominent candle maker in the city. At his father-in-law Alexander Norris's suggestion, he joined forces in 1837 with his brother-in-law, James Gamble, to establish the company that bears their names. Both needed pig fat and Norris's proposal allowed them to procure large quantities from suppliers at a lower cost. The company began to manufacture Ivory soap and profits grew to enormous proportions.

His son William Alexander Procter and grandson William Cooper Procter were company presidents.

Procter is buried in Spring Grove Cemetery, as is his business partner, James Gamble.
