= Tom Moody (businessman) =

British businessman

- Born: Barnsley, South Yorkshire
- Education: Aston University
- Known for: Senior Vice President and Managing Director of Procter & Gamble Northern Europe

Thomas Moody is a English businessman. He is the Senior Vice President and Managing Director of P&G Northern Europe, with responsibility for all of P&G in Northern Europe.

== Early life ==
Moody was born in Barnsley in South Yorkshire. He studied International Business and Modern Languages at Aston University.

== Career ==
He joined P&G straight from university, where he began in sales. Moody then worked as commercial director of P&G’s UK & Ireland haircare division, managing Pantene and Herbal Essences. He also spent four years working at the company’s European headquarters in Geneva.

In 2015, he became Managing Director for P&G in Northern Europe.

== Personal life ==
He is married with three children and lives in Surrey.

== See also ==
- Procter & Gamble
