= Sting.com domain name dispute =

2000 World Intellectual Property Organization case

Gordon Sumner, p/k/a Sting v Michael Urvan was the 2000 dispute before World Intellectual Property Organization between Sting, a prominent English musician and actor, and Michael Urvan, an American gamer, about ownership rights on the domain name "sting.com". The domain name was registered in 1995 by Urvan, who used the monikers "Stingray" and "Sting", to support his gaming activities. Urvan was the first individual to successfully defend against a domain name dispute brought against an individual by a celebrity.

== Origins of sting.com ==
The domain name 'sting.com' was registered to Michael Urvan on July 25, 1995, as an email domain, for the purpose of supporting his gaming, and later for the gaming clan '{LAVA}' globally ranked on TheCLQ.com. Urvan used the moniker '=Sting=' for playing in online games and competitive matches. Urvan originally used the name Stingray as an alias while BBSing in the mid-1980s, borrowed from a 1985 TV series of the same name. While chatting, people tended to abbreviate the name 'Stingray' and only type 'Sting'. It is because of this habit, that during the early 1990s he began using the moniker 'Sting' for pre-WWW Internet MUD games and BBS signons as illustrated in the ICANN Domain Name Dispute response text. Urvan continued to use this moniker throughout the 1990s but has since changed his gaming moniker, post dispute.

== UDRP domain name dispute ==
On July 13, 2000, attorneys for the English musician and actor Sting (born Gordon Sumner) filed a complaint against Urvan for the domain name 'sting.com' via the ICANN Uniform Domain-Name Dispute-Resolution Policy, and the case was sent before World Intellectual Property Organization for arbitration. On July 11, 2000, Dr. Andrew F. Christie was appointed to be the sole panelist by WIPO for the case. On July 19, 2000, after reviewing the complaint submitted by attorneys on the behalf of Sting, and after reviewing the response provided by Urvan, the case was decided in favor of Urvan. The panel's decision was made based on several factors: that 'sting' was a common dictionary word, and that Urvan was using the name in good faith. "Urvan's lawyers argued that sting is a common English word, Sumner had not registered it as a trademark and Urvan was legitimately using it, not holding it to ransom. The WIPO panel agreed."

The case drew international attention for being the first major defeat of a celebrity in a domain name dispute.

The domain name now hosts Sting's website.
