= Reverse domain hijacking =

Reverse domain name hijacking (RDNH; also known as reverse cybersquatting) occurs where a rightful trademark owner attempts to secure a domain name by making cybersquatting claims against a domain name’s "cybersquatter" owner. This often intimidates domain name owners into transferring ownership of their domain names to trademark owners to avoid legal action, particularly when the domain names belong to smaller organizations or individuals. Reverse domain name hijacking is most commonly enacted by larger corporations and famous individuals, in defense of their rightful trademark or to prevent libel or slander.

Reverse domain name "hijacking" is a legal remedy to counter the practice of domain squatting, wherein individuals hold many registered domain names containing famous third party trademarks with the intent of profiting by selling the domain names back to trademark owners. Trademark owners initially responded by filing cybersquatting lawsuits against registrants to enforce their trademark rights. However, as the number of cybersquatting incidents grew, trademark owners noticed that registrants would often settle their cases rather than litigate. Cybersquatting lawsuits are a defensive strategy to combat cybersquatting, however such lawsuits may also be used as a way of strongarming innocent domain name registrants into giving up domain names that the trademark owner is not, in fact, entitled to.

== UDRP restrictions on reverse domain name hijacking ==
Paragraph 15(e) of the UDRP rules defines reverse domain name hijacking as the filing of a complaint in bad faith, resulting in the abuse of the UDRP administrative process. It becomes difficult to objectively quantify what constitutes subjective "bad faith", resulting in panels often viewing parties' factual discrepancies as indeterminable or immaterial at best. Therefore, despite its express recognition in the UDRP, reverse domain name hijacking findings are rare and based heavily on the factual circumstances surrounding each case.

Circumstances which have been cited by WIPO panels as justification for a finding of reverse domain name hijacking includes:

- When the registration of the domain predates any trademark rights of the Complainant.
- When the complaint has provided no evidence of bad faith registration or use directed towards the Complainant.
- Where the Complainant has used the UDRP as a Plan "B" option to attempt to secure the domain after commercial negotiations have broken off.
- Where the Complainant has attempted to deceive the domain owner or makes misrepresentations or fails to disclose material information to the panel.

Examples of such findings include the following WIPO cases: Sanofi SA vs. Monogram Naming LLC over domain Initiv.com (2022). Gregory Ricks vs. RVK, Inc. (Formally RVKuhns and Associates) (2015). Ron Paul vs. RonPaul.org (2013), Webpass, Inc. v. Paul Breitenbach (2010), Urban Logic, Inc. vs. Urban Logic, Peter Holland (2009), David Robinson v. Brendan (2008), Decal v. Gregory Ricks (2008), Hero v. The Heroic Sandwich (2008), Poker Host Inc. v. Russ "Dutch" Boyd (2008), FCC Fomento de Construcciones y Contratas vs. "FCC.COM" (2007), Liquid Nutrition vs. liquidnutrition.com (2007), Rohl, LLC vs. ROHL SA (2006), Her Majesty the Queen (Elizabeth II) vs. Virtual Countries, Inc., and Deutsche Welle vs. DiamondWare (2000). A list of over one hundred reverse domain name hijacking decisions is available at rdnh.com.

Although UDRP panelists currently have no tools by which to punish abuses such as Reverse Domain Name Hijacking, such a finding might be used in a local jurisdiction where such abuses might constitute a tort such as tortious interference with contract or an unfair business practice.

== ACPA restrictions on reverse domain name hijacking ==
The Anticybersquatting Consumer Protection Act does not expressly recognize reverse domain name hijacking and often only limits defendants' recovery to retention or transference of the domain name. It also fails to provide any remedies for victims of attempted reverse cybersquatting. However, the statute permits some monetary relief where bad faith, reckless disregard or the willful violation of a court order are involved.

Similarly, a 1975 amendment to the Lanham Act gives courts discretion in awarding reasonable attorneys' fees to a prevailing party in "exceptional" circumstances. In attempting to define "exceptional", Circuit courts are split as to what objectively constitutes malicious, fraudulent, or deliberate misconduct. Some courts award such fees where bad faith or baseless litigation is involved while other courts look for economic coercion or failure to reference controlling law. Nevertheless, due to the inherent animosity arising from being sued, courts generally hold prevailing defendants to a higher level of scrutiny, requiring vexatious or harassing conduct to shift attorney's fees in their favor.

== Implications ==
Neither the UDRP nor the ACPA provides much deterrent to curb trademark owners' abuse of their rights. To abate reverse domain name hijacking practices, some legal professionals believe Congress should enact laws that are specifically designed to facilitate litigation against reverse cybersquatters. Similarly, some advocates argue for stronger penalties to deter the unlawful deprivation of validly registered domain names, such as fines and precluding offending trademark owners from filing cybersquatting claims for a designated period of time.
