= Uniform Domain-Name Dispute-Resolution Policy =

Process of dispute resolution

The Uniform Domain-Name Dispute-Resolution Policy (UDRP) is a process established by the Internet Corporation for Assigned Names and Numbers (ICANN) for the resolution of disputes regarding the registration of internet domain names. The UDRP currently applies to all generic top level domains (.com, .net, .org, etc.), some country code top-level domains, and to all new generic top-level domains (.xyz, .online, .top, etc.).

== Historical background ==
When ICANN was first set up, a core task assigned to it was "The Trademark Dilemma", the use of trade marks as domain names without the trademark owner's consent. By the late 1990s, such use was identified as problematic and likely to lead to consumers being misled. In the United Kingdom, the Court of Appeal described such domain names as "an instrument of fraud".

One of the first steps was that Member States commissioned the United Nations World Intellectual Property Organization (WIPO) to produce a report on the tension between trademarks and domain names. Published on 30 April 1999, the WIPO Report recommended the establishment of a "mandatory administrative procedure concerning abusive registrations", which would allow for a "neutral venue in the context of disputes that are often international in nature." The procedure was not intended to deal with cases with competing rights, nor would it exclude the jurisdiction of the courts. It would, however, be mandatory in the sense that "each domain name application would, in the domain name agreement, be required to submit to the procedure if a claim was initiated against it by a third party. The WIPO Report also set out the current three-stage test of the UDRP.

At its meetings on August 25 and 26, 1999 in Santiago, Chile, the ICANN Board of Directors adopted the UDRP Policy, based on the recommendations contained in the Report of the WIPO Internet Domain Name Process, as well as comments submitted by registrars and other interested parties.

On October 24, 1999, the ICANN Board adopted a set of Rules for Uniform Domain Name Dispute Resolution Policy (the UDRP Rules) setting out the procedures and other requirements for each stage of the dispute resolution administrative procedure. The procedure is administered by dispute resolution service providers accredited by ICANN.

Following adoption by ICANN, the UDRP was launched on 1 December 1999, and the first case determined under it by WIPO was World Wrestling Federation Entertainment, Inc v. Michael Bosman, involving the domain name worldwrestlingfederation.com. Since then WIPO provides a globally-used Jurisprudential Overview to summarize case law on a range of common and important substantive and procedural issues under the UDRP.

== Adoption ==
The policy has been adopted by all ICANN-accredited registrars. It has also been adopted by certain managers of country-code top-level domains (e.g., .nu, .tv, .ws).

The policy is then applicable due to the contract between the registrar (or other registration authority in the case of a country-code top-level domain) and its customer (the domain-name holder or registrant). When a registrant chooses a domain name, the registrant must "represent and warrant", among other things, that registering the domain name "will not infringe upon or otherwise violate the rights of any third party", and agree to participate in an arbitration-like proceeding should any third party assert such a claim.

The policy itself sets forth the terms and conditions in connection with a dispute between the registrant and any party (other than the registrar) over the registration and use of the Internet domain name registered by the registrant.

In case of a dispute, the complainant shall select one of the administrative-dispute-resolution service providers from among those approved by ICANN by submitting the complaint to that Provider. The selected Provider will administer the proceeding. Proceedings under this Policy will be conducted according to the Rules for Uniform Domain Name Dispute Resolution Policy, as well as the selected administrative-dispute-resolution service provider's supplemental rules.

Providers of the UDRP are:

- The Arab Center for Dispute Resolution (ACDR)
- The Asian Domain Name Dispute Resolution Centre (ADNDRC)
- Canadian International Internet Dispute Resolution Centre (CIIDRC)
- Czech Arbitration Court, Arbitration Center for Internet Disputes
- National Arbitration Forum (NAF)
- World Intellectual Property Organization (WIPO)

== Process ==
A complainant in a UDRP proceeding must establish three elements to succeed:

- The domain name is identical or confusingly similar to a trademark or service mark in which the complainant has rights;
- The registrant does not have any rights or legitimate interests in the domain name; and
- The domain name has been registered and the domain name is being used in "bad faith".

In a UDRP proceeding, a panel will consider several non-exclusive factors to assess bad faith, such as:

- Whether the registrant registered the domain name primarily for the purpose of selling, renting, or otherwise transferring the domain name registration to the complainant who is the owner of the trademark or service mark;
- Whether the registrant registered the domain name to prevent the owner of the trademark or service mark from reflecting the mark in a corresponding domain name, if the domain name owner has engaged in a pattern of such conduct; and
- Whether the registrant registered the domain name primarily for the purpose of disrupting the business of a competitor; or
- Whether by using the domain name, the registrant has intentionally attempted to attract, for commercial gain, internet users to the registrant's website, by creating a likelihood of confusion with the complainant's mark.

The goal of the UDRP is to create a streamlined process for resolving such disputes. It was envisioned that this process would be quicker and less expensive than a standard legal challenge in a national or foreign court. In addition, the procedures are more informal than litigation and the decision-makers are experts in such areas as international trademark law, domain name issues, electronic commerce, the Internet and dispute resolution. It is also international in scope: it provides a single mechanism for resolving a domain name dispute regardless of where the registrar or the domain name holder or the complainant are located.

In order to file a UDRP complaint with a UDRP provider, the costs often start around US$1,000 to $2,000. The costs of the case will depend on the number of domain names involved and whether the case is decided by a single or by 3 panelists. For example, a case handled by the WIPO Arbitration and Mediation Center, involving between 6 and 10 domain names and decided by 3 panelists would cost US$ 5,000. Those fees do not include any payment that might have to be made to a lawyer representing a party in the administrative proceeding. Fees are available in Providers supplemental rules. In order to assist parties in filing their pleadings, WIPO provides a guide of case law called the WIPO Overview; this resource summarizes almost 1,000 UDRP decisions from hundreds of expert panelists.

If a party loses a UDRP proceeding, in many jurisdictions they may still bring a lawsuit against the domain name registrant under local law. For example, the administrative panel's UDRP decision can be challenged and in effect "overturned" in a U.S. court of law by means of e.g. the Anticybersquatting Consumer Protection Act. If a domain name registrant loses a UDRP proceeding, they can file a lawsuit against the trademark holder within ten business days to prevent a registrar from transferring the domain name in the relevant jurisdiction (either the location of the registrar's principal office or the registrant's location).

== Examples ==
The UDRP process has been used in a number of well-known cases.

In January 2000, the World Wrestling Federation (WWF) won the first UDRP against Michael Bosman in California, who registered worldwrestlingfederation.com and attempted to sell it to the Federation. Ironically, in May 2002, the Federation would change its name to World Wrestling Entertainment (WWE), after a trademark dispute over the "WWF" initials with the World Wide Fund for Nature (WWF). The Federation let the WWF.com domain expire in December 2002 as there was no legal obligation to transfer it to the Fund. Gregory Ricks would later acquire WWF.com for his Web Wrestling Forum. The Fund attempted a UDRP against Ricks, however were unsuccessful in a 2006 decision by ICANN, as Ricks was not impersonating the Fund with the domain.

In the Madonna Ciccone, p/k/a Madonna v. Dan Parisi and "Madonna.com" case (2000), the panel found against the defendant registrant based on all three of the above factors and ordered the domain name turned over to Madonna. On the other hand, in the Gordon Sumner p/k/a Sting v Michael Urvan on the same year, American gamer Michael Urvan retained the right to domain name "sting.com" against the complaint of Sting, since the panel found that 'sting' was a common dictionary word, it was not registered as a trademark, and that Urvan was using the name in good faith rather than holding it to ransom.

In the Wal-Mart Stores, Inc. v. Richard MacLeod d/b/a For Sale case (2000), the decision describes the practice of cybersquatting. The UDRP was adopted to prevent such behavior where a domain name registrant tries to extort money from trademark owners. In this case, the expert found that the evidence showed the registrant was not using the domain name "wal-martsucks.com" for a criticism site but instead try to get a payout from Walmart.

The Oki Data Americas, Inc. v. ASD, Inc. case (2001) is one of the most cited "fair use" decisions under the UDRP, it raises the question of whether an authorized (and non-authorized) sales or service agent of trademarked goods can use the trademark in a domain name.

The Commissioners for HM Revenue and Customs v. Adil Khasanov case (2020) provides an example of the impact of the COVID-19 crisis in the Domain Name System, and the increasing number of fraudulent domain name registrations.

== Domain name disputes under new generic top-level domains ==
In 2012, ICANN launched a process to create new generic top-level domains (gTLDs). Over 1,900 applications were made. As part of the expansion of the domain name system, ICANN introduced a number of new brand protection mechanisms. Opinions differ as to whether or not these new processes will be effective. Industry commentators predict that the UDRP will continue to be used, and that there will be a "substantial increase in cybersquatting". Evidence from previous expansions of the namespace, however, indicates the continued dominance of .com both in size and as the first-choice domain for cybersquatting (based on number of disputes).

The WIPO Arbitration and Mediation Center was appointed by ICANN as the exclusive provider of dispute resolution services for trademark based "pre-delegation" Legal Rights Objections (LRO) under ICANN New gTLD Program. The WIPO Center 2013 Report provides a resume and analysis in relation to the Legal Rights Objection (LRO) procedure where trademark owners could object to a new gTLD application they worried might infringe their rights.

== See also ==
- Cybersquatting
- DNS
- Top-level domain
- Typosquatting
- Reverse domain hijacking
- URL
