= List of assigned /8 IPv4 address blocks =

Some large /8 blocks of IPv4 addresses, the former Class A network blocks, are assigned in whole to single organizations or related groups of organizations, either by the Internet Corporation for Assigned Names and Numbers (ICANN), through the Internet Assigned Numbers Authority (IANA), or a regional Internet registry.

Each /8 block contains 256^{3} = 2^{24} = 16,777,216 addresses, which covers the whole range of the last three delimited segments of an IP address. This means that 256 /8 address blocks fit into the entire IPv4 space.

As IPv4 address exhaustion has advanced to its final stages, some organizations, such as Stanford University, formerly using 36.0.0.0/8, have returned their allocated blocks (in this case to APNIC) to assist in the delay of the exhaustion date.

== List of reserved /8 blocks ==
Block	Organization	IANA date	RIR date	Notes
0.0.0.0/8	IANA – Local Identification	1981-09		Originally IANA – Reserved 1981-09. 0.0.0.0/8 reserved for self-identification.
10.0.0.0/8	IANA – Private Use	1995-06		Reserved for Private Networks. Formerly ARPANET.
127.0.0.0/8	IANA – Loopback	1981-09		127.0.0.0/8 is reserved for loopback.
224.0.0.0/8–239.0.0.0/8	Multicast	1981-09	1991-05-22	Multicast (formerly "Class D") registered in multicast addresses
240.0.0.0/8–255.0.0.0/8	Future Use	1981-09		Reserved for future use (formerly "Class E"). 255.255.255.255 is reserved for "limited broadcast" destination address.

== List of /8 blocks assigned to commercial organizations ==
Block	Organization	IANA date	RIR date	Notes
12.0.0.0/8	AT&T Services	1995-06	1983-08-23	Originally AT&T Bell Laboratories, but retained by AT&T when Bell Labs was spun off to Lucent Technologies in 1996. Assignment administered by ARIN (Legacy space).
17.0.0.0/8	Apple Inc.	1992-07	1990-04-16	Assignment administered by ARIN (Legacy space)
19.0.0.0/8	Ford Motor Company	1995-05	1988-06-15	Assignment administered by ARIN (Legacy space)
38.0.0.0/8	Cogent Communications	1994-09	1991-04-16	Formerly PSINet. As of 2025, portions of this range are leased to local ISPs. Assignment administered by ARIN (Legacy space)
53.0.0.0/8	Mercedes-Benz Group AG	1993-10	—N/a	Assignment administered by RIPE (Legacy space)
73.0.0.0/8	Comcast Corporation	N/A	2005-04-19	Assignment administered by ARIN

== List of /8 blocks assigned to the United States Department of Defense ==
Block	Organization	IANA date	RIR date	Notes
6.0.0.0/8	Army Information Systems Center	1994-02	1994-02-01	Headquarters, USAISC
7.0.0.0/8	DoD Network Information Center	1995-04	1997-11-24	Formerly IANA – Reserved 1995-04. Entirely assigned to DoD Network Information Center (DNIC) 1997-11-24. Updated to Administered by ARIN not before 2007.
11.0.0.0/8	DoD Intel Information Systems	1993-05	1984-01-19	
21.0.0.0/8	DDN-RVN	1991-07	1991-07-01	DoD Network Information Center (DNIC)
22.0.0.0/8	Defense Information Systems Agency	1993-05	1989-06-26	DoD Network Information Center (DNIC)
26.0.0.0/8	Defense Information Systems Agency	1995-05	1995-05-01	DoD Network Information Center (DNIC)
28.0.0.0/8	DSI-North	1992-07		DoD Network Information Center (DNIC)
29.0.0.0/8	Defense Information Systems Agency	1991-07	1991-07-01	DoD Network Information Center (DNIC)
30.0.0.0/8	Defense Information Systems Agency	1991-07	1991-07-01	DoD Network Information Center (DNIC)
33.0.0.0/8	DLA Systems Automation Center	1991-01	1991-01-01	DoD Network Information Center (DNIC)
55.0.0.0/8	DoD Network Information Center	1995-04	1996-10-26	Headquarters, USAISC. Formerly Boeing Computer Services 1995-04. Updated to DoD Network Information Center in 2007-02.
214.0.0.0/8	US-DOD	1998-03	1998-03-27	DoD Network Information Center (DNIC)
215.0.0.0/8	US-DOD	1998-03	1998-06-05	DoD Network Information Center (DNIC)

== List of /8 blocks assigned to the regional Internet registries ==
Map of regional Internet registries

The regional Internet registries (RIRs) allocate IPs within a particular region of the world.

Block	Organization	IANA date	RIR date	Notes
1.0.0.0/8	APNIC	2010-01		Formerly IANA – reserved 1981-09.
2.0.0.0/8	RIPE NCC	2009-10		Formerly IANA – reserved 1981-09.
3.0.0.0/8	ARIN	1994-05		Amazon.com. Formerly General Electric Company.
4.0.0.0/8	ARIN	1992-12		Various registries (maintained by ARIN). Formerly Bolt Beranek and Newman Inc., then GTE, then Genuity, then Level 3 Communications, Inc.
5.0.0.0/8	RIPE NCC	2010-11		Formerly IANA – reserved 1995-07.
8.0.0.0/8	ARIN	1992-12	1992-12-01	Various registries (maintained by ARIN). Formerly Bolt Beranek and Newman Inc., then GTE, then Genuity, then Level 3 Communications, Inc.
9.0.0.0/8	ARIN	1992-08		Various registries (maintained by ARIN). Formerly IBM.
13.0.0.0/8	ARIN	1991-09		Various registries (maintained by ARIN). Formerly Xerox.
14.0.0.0/8	APNIC	2010-04		Starting 1991-06-01, was used to map Public Data Network (X.121) addresses to IP addresses. Returned to IANA 2008-01-22. This network was reclaimed by IANA in 2007 and was subsequently re-allocated in 2010. See RFC 877 and RFC 1356 for historical information.
15.0.0.0/8	ARIN	1991-09		Various registries (maintained by ARIN). Formerly Hewlett-Packard Company. HP Inc still uses a portion of the block.
16.0.0.0/8	ARIN	1994-11	1989-05-18	Various registries (maintained by ARIN). Formerly Digital Equipment Corporation, then Compaq, then Hewlett-Packard.
18.0.0.0/8	ARIN	1994-01		Various registries (maintained by ARIN). Formerly MIT.
20.0.0.0/8	ARIN	1994-10		Various registries (maintained by ARIN). Formerly DXC Technology. Computer Sciences Corporation, who owned this block, merged with HP Enterprise Services to create DXC Technology on 3 April 2017.
23.0.0.0/8	ARIN	2010-11		Formerly IANA – reserved 1995-07.
24.0.0.0/8	ARIN	2001-05	2001-05-01	Formerly IANA – Cable Block 1995-07, then ARIN – Cable Block 2001-05. Updated to ARIN not before 2007.
25.0.0.0/8	RIPE NCC	1995-01		As of 2005-08-23 entire block assigned to UK Ministry of Defence
27.0.0.0/8	APNIC	2010-01		Formerly IANA – reserved 1995-04.
31.0.0.0/8	RIPE NCC	2010-05	2010-05-18	Formerly IANA – reserved 1991-04.
32.0.0.0/8	ARIN	1994-06		Various registries (maintained by ARIN). Formerly AT&T Global Network Services. Originally Norsk Informasjonsteknologi (at that time maintained by RIPE NCC). IBM acquired Norsk Informasjonsteknologi (Norway) in 1995.
34.0.0.0/8	ARIN	1993-03		Various registries (maintained by ARIN). Formerly Halliburton Company.
35.0.0.0/8	ARIN	1994-04	2012-08	Various registries (Maintained by ARIN). Formerly Merit Network 1986.
36.0.0.0/8	APNIC	2010-10		Formerly Stanford University 1993-04, then IANA – Reserved 2000-07.
37.0.0.0/8	RIPE NCC	2010-11		Formerly IANA – Reserved 1995-04.
39.0.0.0/8	APNIC	2011-01		Formerly IANA – Reserved 1995-04.
40.0.0.0/8	ARIN	1994-06		Various registries (Maintained by ARIN).
41.0.0.0/8	AFRINIC	2005-04		Formerly IANA – Reserved 1995-05.
42.0.0.0/8	APNIC	2010-10		Formerly IANA – Reserved 1995-07.
43.0.0.0/8	APNIC	1991-01	1989-02-21	Various registries (Maintained by APNIC). Originally Japan Inet 1991-01 (IANA date) or 1989-02-21 (RIR date). Administered by APNIC not before 2007.
44.0.0.0/8	ARIN	1992-07	2019-07-18	Various registries (Maintained by ARIN). Originally Amateur Radio Digital Communications. 44.192.0.0/10 was sold to Amazon on 2019-07-18.
45.0.0.0/8	ARIN	1995-01	1991-09-09	Various registries (Maintained by ARIN). Formerly Interop Show Network 1995-01 or 1991-09-09 (RIR date). Returned to ARIN in 2010-10 except a /15 block. In 2011 it became available for distribution (or possibly be returned to the IANA, depending on the global policy in effect at that time).
46.0.0.0/8	RIPE NCC	2009-09		Formerly Bolt Beranek and Newman Inc. 1992-12. Returned to IANA in 2007-04. Updated to IANA – Reserved in 2007-04.
47.0.0.0/8	ARIN	1991-01		Various registries (Maintained by ARIN). Formerly Bell-Northern Research, which became Northern Telecom, aka, Nortel, until its demise, circa 2010.
48.0.0.0/8	ARIN	2023-10-02	1990-12-07	Assignment administered by ARIN (Legacy space). Formerly Prudential Financial, who still use a portion of the space.
49.0.0.0/8	APNIC	2010-08		Formerly Joint Technical Command (Returned to IANA Mar 98) 1994-05. Updated to IANA – Reserved in 2007-05.
50.0.0.0/8	ARIN	2010-02		Formerly Joint Technical Command (Returned to IANA Mar 98) 1994-05. Updated to IANA – Reserved in 2007-05.
51.0.0.0/8	RIPE NCC	1994-08		Various registries (Maintained by RIPE NCC). Formerly UK Government Department for Work and Pensions.
52.0.0.0/8	ARIN	1991-12		Formerly DuPont.
54.0.0.0/8	ARIN	1992-03		Various registries (Maintained by ARIN).
56.0.0.0/8	ARIN	1992-11		Formerly United States Postal Service.
57.0.0.0/8	RIPE NCC	1995-05		Formerly SITA.
58.0.0.0/8	APNIC	2004-04		
59.0.0.0/8	APNIC	2004-04		
60.0.0.0/8	APNIC	2010-01		Formerly IANA – Reserved 1981-09.
61.0.0.0/8	APNIC	2010-01		Formerly IANA – Reserved 1981-09.
62.0.0.0/8	RIPE NCC	1997-04		
63.0.0.0/8	ARIN	1997-04		
64.0.0.0/8	ARIN	1999-07		
65.0.0.0/8	ARIN	2000-07		
66.0.0.0/8	ARIN	2000-07		
67.0.0.0/8	ARIN	2001-05		
68.0.0.0/8	ARIN	2001-06		
69.0.0.0/8	ARIN	2002-08		
70.0.0.0/8	ARIN	2004-01		
71.0.0.0/8	ARIN	2004-08		
72.0.0.0/8	ARIN	2004-08		
74.0.0.0/8	ARIN	2005-06		
75.0.0.0/8	ARIN	2005-06		
76.0.0.0/8	ARIN	2005-06		
77.0.0.0/8	RIPE NCC	2006-08		
78.0.0.0/8	RIPE NCC	2006-08		
79.0.0.0/8	RIPE NCC	2006-08		
80.0.0.0/8	RIPE NCC	2001-04		
81.0.0.0/8	RIPE NCC	2001-04		
82.0.0.0/8	RIPE NCC	2002-11		
83.0.0.0/8	RIPE NCC	2003-11		
84.0.0.0/8	RIPE NCC	2003-11		
85.0.0.0/8	RIPE NCC	2004-04		
86.0.0.0/8	RIPE NCC	2004-04		
87.0.0.0/8	RIPE NCC	2004-04		
88.0.0.0/8	RIPE NCC	2010-01		Formerly IANA – Reserved 1981-09.
89.0.0.0/8	RIPE NCC	2005-06		
90.0.0.0/8	RIPE NCC	2005-06		Except for 90.0.0.0/9 (the low half of the range), which is Orange
91.0.0.0/8	RIPE NCC	2005-06		
92.0.0.0/8	RIPE NCC	2007-03		
93.0.0.0/8	ARIN	1994-05		
94.0.0.0/8	RIPE NCC	2007-07		
95.0.0.0/8	RIPE NCC	2007-07		
96.0.0.0/8	ARIN	2006-10		
97.0.0.0/8	ARIN	2006-10		
98.0.0.0/8	ARIN	2006-10		
99.0.0.0/8	ARIN	2006-10		
100.0.0.0/8	ARIN	2010-11		100.64.0.0/10 reserved for Carrier-grade NAT (detailed in RFC 6598).
101.0.0.0/8	APNIC	2010-08		
102.0.0.0/8	AFRINIC	2011-02		
103.0.0.0/8	APNIC	2011-02		
104.0.0.0/8	ARIN	2011-02		
105.0.0.0/8	AFRINIC	2010-11		
106.0.0.0/8	APNIC	2011-01		
107.0.0.0/8	ARIN	2010-02		
108.0.0.0/8	ARIN	2008-12		
109.0.0.0/8	RIPE NCC	2009-01		
110.0.0.0/8	APNIC	2008-11		
111.0.0.0/8	APNIC	2010-01		Formerly IANA – Reserved 1981-09.
112.0.0.0/8	APNIC	2008-05		
113.0.0.0/8	APNIC	2008-05		
114.0.0.0/8	APNIC	2010-01		Formerly IANA – Reserved 1981-09.
115.0.0.0/8	APNIC	2007-10		
116.0.0.0/8	APNIC	2007-01		
117.0.0.0/8	APNIC	2007-01		
118.0.0.0/8	APNIC	2007-01		
119.0.0.0/8	APNIC	2007-01		
120.0.0.0/8	APNIC	2010-01		Formerly IANA – Reserved 1981-09.
121.0.0.0/8	APNIC	2006-01		
122.0.0.0/8	APNIC	2006-01		
123.0.0.0/8	APNIC	2006-01		
124.0.0.0/8	APNIC	2005-01		
125.0.0.0/8	APNIC	2005-01		
126.0.0.0/8	APNIC	2005-01		SoftBank Group
128.0.0.0/8	ARIN	1993-05		Various registries (Maintained by ARIN). 128.0.0.0 is the start address of formerly "Class B".
129.0.0.0/8	ARIN	1993-05		Various registries (Maintained by ARIN).
130.0.0.0/8	ARIN	1993-05		Various registries (Maintained by ARIN).
131.0.0.0/8	ARIN	1993-05		Various registries (Maintained by ARIN).
132.0.0.0/8	ARIN	1993-05		Various registries (Maintained by ARIN).
133.0.0.0/8	APNIC	1997-03		JPNIC
134.0.0.0/8	ARIN	1993-05		Various registries (Maintained by ARIN).
135.0.0.0/8	ARIN	1993-05		Various registries (Maintained by ARIN).
136.0.0.0/8	ARIN	1993-05		Various registries (Maintained by ARIN).
137.0.0.0/8	ARIN	1993-05		Various registries (Maintained by ARIN).
138.0.0.0/8	ARIN	1993-05		Various registries (Maintained by ARIN).
139.0.0.0/8	ARIN	1993-05		Various registries (Maintained by ARIN).
140.0.0.0/8	ARIN	1993-05		Various registries (Maintained by ARIN).
141.0.0.0/8	RIPE NCC	1993-05		Various registries (Maintained by RIPE NCC).
142.0.0.0/8	ARIN	1993-05		Various registries (Maintained by ARIN).
143.0.0.0/8	ARIN	1993-05		Various registries (Maintained by ARIN).
144.0.0.0/8	ARIN	1993-05		Various registries (Maintained by ARIN).
145.0.0.0/8	RIPE NCC	1993-05		Various registries (Maintained by RIPE NCC).
146.0.0.0/8	ARIN	1993-05		Various registries (Maintained by ARIN).
147.0.0.0/8	ARIN	1993-05		Various registries (Maintained by ARIN).
148.0.0.0/8	ARIN	1993-05		Various registries (Maintained by ARIN).
149.0.0.0/8	ARIN	1993-05		Various registries (Maintained by ARIN).
150.0.0.0/8	APNIC	1993-05		Various registries (Maintained by APNIC).
151.0.0.0/8	RIPE NCC	1993-05		Various registries (Maintained by RIPE NCC).
152.0.0.0/8	ARIN	1993-05		Various registries (Maintained by ARIN).
153.0.0.0/8	APNIC	1993-05		Various registries (Maintained by APNIC).
154.0.0.0/8	AFRINIC	1993-05		Various registries (Maintained by AFRINIC).
155.0.0.0/8	ARIN	1993-05		Various registries (Maintained by ARIN).
156.0.0.0/8	ARIN	1993-05		Various registries (Maintained by ARIN).
157.0.0.0/8	ARIN	1993-05		Various registries (Maintained by ARIN).
158.0.0.0/8	ARIN	1993-05		Various registries (Maintained by ARIN).
159.0.0.0/8	ARIN	1993-05		Various registries (Maintained by ARIN).
160.0.0.0/8	ARIN	1993-05		Various registries (Maintained by ARIN).
161.0.0.0/8	ARIN	1993-05		Various registries (Maintained by ARIN).
162.0.0.0/8	ARIN	1993-05		Various registries (Maintained by ARIN).
163.0.0.0/8	APNIC	1993-05		Various registries (Maintained by APNIC).
164.0.0.0/8	ARIN	1993-05		Various registries (Maintained by ARIN).
165.0.0.0/8	ARIN	1993-05		Various registries (Maintained by ARIN).
166.0.0.0/8	ARIN	1993-05		Various registries (Maintained by ARIN).
167.0.0.0/8	ARIN	1993-05		Various registries (Maintained by ARIN).
168.0.0.0/8	ARIN	1993-05		Various registries (Maintained by ARIN).
169.0.0.0/8	ARIN	1993-05	1993-05-01	Various registries (Maintained by ARIN). 169.254.0.0/16 (169.254.0.0–169.254.255.255) reserved for link-local addressing (RFC 6890).
170.0.0.0/8	ARIN	1993-05		Various registries (Maintained by ARIN).
171.0.0.0/8	APNIC	1993-05		Various registries (Maintained by APNIC).
172.0.0.0/8	ARIN	1993-05	1993-05-01	Various registries (Maintained by ARIN). 172.16.0.0/12 (172.16.0.0–172.31.255.255) reserved for private networks (RFC 1918).
173.0.0.0/8	ARIN	2008-02		
174.0.0.0/8	ARIN	2008-02		
175.0.0.0/8	APNIC	2009-08		
176.0.0.0/8	RIPE NCC	2010-05		
177.0.0.0/8	LACNIC	2010-06		
178.0.0.0/8	RIPE NCC	2009-01		Various registries (Maintained by RIPE NCC).
179.0.0.0/8	LACNIC	2011-02		
180.0.0.0/8	APNIC	2009-04		
181.0.0.0/8	LACNIC	2010-06		
182.0.0.0/8	APNIC	2009-08		
183.0.0.0/8	APNIC	2010-01		Formerly IANA – Reserved 1981-09.
184.0.0.0/8	ARIN	2008-12		
185.0.0.0/8	RIPE NCC	2011-02		Various registries (Maintained by RIPE NCC).
186.0.0.0/8	LACNIC	2007-09		
187.0.0.0/8	LACNIC	2007-09		
188.0.0.0/8	RIPE NCC	1993-05		Various registries (Maintained by RIPE NCC).
189.0.0.0/8	LACNIC	1995-06		
190.0.0.0/8	LACNIC	1995-06		
191.0.0.0/8	LACNIC	1993-05		Various registries (Maintained by LACNIC).
192.0.0.0/8	ARIN	1993-05	1993-05-01	Various registries (Maintained by ARIN). 192.0.2.0/24 reserved for TEST-NET-1 (RFC 5737). 192.88.99.0/24 reserved for 6to4 Relay Anycast (RFC 3068). 192.168.0.0/16 (192.168.0.0–192.168.255.255) reserved for private networks (RFC 1918). 192.0.0.0/24 reserved for IANA IPv4 Special Purpose Address Registry (RFC 5736). 192.0.0.0 is the start address of formerly "Class C".
193.0.0.0/8	RIPE NCC	1993-05		
194.0.0.0/8	RIPE NCC	1993-05		
195.0.0.0/8	RIPE NCC	1993-05		
196.0.0.0/8	AFRINIC	1993-05		Various registries (Maintained by AFRINIC).
197.0.0.0/8	AFRINIC	2008-10		
198.0.0.0/8	ARIN	1993-05		Various registries (Maintained by ARIN). 198.18.0.0/15 reserved for Network Interconnect Device Benchmark Testing (RFC 6890). 198.51.100.0/24 reserved for TEST-NET-2 (RFC 5737).
199.0.0.0/8	ARIN	1993-05		
200.0.0.0/8	LACNIC	2002-11		
201.0.0.0/8	LACNIC	2003-04		
202.0.0.0/8	APNIC	2009-10		Various registries (Maintained by APNIC). 202.123.0.0/19 transferred to AFRINIC
203.0.0.0/8	APNIC	1993-05		203.0.113.0/24 reserved for TEST-NET-3 (RFC 5737).
204.0.0.0/8	ARIN	1994-03		
205.0.0.0/8	ARIN	1994-03		
206.0.0.0/8	ARIN	1995-04		
207.0.0.0/8	ARIN	1995-11		
208.0.0.0/8	ARIN	1996-04		
209.0.0.0/8	ARIN	1996-06		
210.0.0.0/8	APNIC	1996-06		
211.0.0.0/8	APNIC	1996-06		
212.0.0.0/8	RIPE NCC	1997-10		
213.0.0.0/8	RIPE NCC	1993-10		
216.0.0.0/8	ARIN	1998-04		
217.0.0.0/8	RIPE NCC	2000-06	2002-06-25	
218.0.0.0/8	APNIC	2010-01		Formerly IANA – Reserved 1981-09.
219.0.0.0/8	APNIC	2001-09		
220.0.0.0/8	APNIC	2001-12		
221.0.0.0/8	APNIC	2002-07		
222.0.0.0/8	APNIC	2003-02		
223.0.0.0/8	APNIC	2010-04		

Note that this list may not include current assignments of /8 blocks to all regional or national Internet registries.

== Original list of IPv4 assigned address blocks ==
The original list of IPv4 address blocks was published in September 1981. In previous versions of the document, network numbers were 8-bit numbers rather than the 32-bit numbers used in IPv4. At that time, three networks were added that were not listed earlier: 42.rrr.rrr.rrr, 43.rrr.rrr.rrr, and 44.rrr.rrr.rrr.

The relevant portion of RFC 790 is reproduced here with minor changes:

- 000.rrr.rrr.rrr Reserved [JBP]
- 001.rrr.rrr.rrr BBN-PR BBN Packet Radio Network [DCA2]
- 002.rrr.rrr.rrr SF-PR-1 SF Packet Radio Network [JEM]
- 003.rrr.rrr.rrr BBN-RCC BBN RCC Network [SGC]
- 004.rrr.rrr.rrr SATNET Atlantic Satellite Network [DM11]
- 005.rrr.rrr.rrr SILL-PR Ft. Sill Packet Radio Network[JEM]
- 006.rrr.rrr.rrr SF-PR-2 SF Packet Radio Network [JEM]
- 007.rrr.rrr.rrr CHAOS MIT CHAOS Network [MOON]
- 008.rrr.rrr.rrr CLARKNET SATNET subnet for Clarksburg [DM11]
- 009.rrr.rrr.rrr BRAGG-PR Ft. Bragg Packet Radio Net [JEM]
- 010.rrr.rrr.rrr ARPANET ARPANET [VGC]
- 011.rrr.rrr.rrr UCLNET University College London [PK]
- 012.rrr.rrr.rrr CYCLADES CYCLADES [VGC]
- 013.rrr.rrr.rrr Unassigned [JBP]
- 014.rrr.rrr.rrr TELENET TELENET [VGC]
- 015.rrr.rrr.rrr EPSS British Post Office EPSS [PK]
- 016.rrr.rrr.rrr DATAPAC DATAPAC [VGC]
- 017.rrr.rrr.rrr TRANSPAC TRANSPAC [VGC]
- 018.rrr.rrr.rrr LCSNET MIT LCS Network [DDC2]
- 019.rrr.rrr.rrr TYMNET TYMNET [VGC]
- 020.rrr.rrr.rrr DC-PR D.C. Packet Radio Network [VGC]
- 021.rrr.rrr.rrr EDN DCEC EDN [EC5]
- 022.rrr.rrr.rrr DIALNET DIALNET [MRC]
- 023.rrr.rrr.rrr MITRE MITRE Cablenet [APS]
- 024.rrr.rrr.rrr BBN-LOCAL BBN Local Network [SGC]
- 025.rrr.rrr.rrr RSRE-PPSN RSRE / PPSN [BD2]
- 026.rrr.rrr.rrr AUTODIN-II AUTODIN II [EC5]
- 027.rrr.rrr.rrr NOSC-LCCN NOSC / LCCN [KTP]
- 028.rrr.rrr.rrr WIDEBAND Wide Band Satellite Network [CJW2]
- 029.rrr.rrr.rrr DCN-COMSAT COMSAT Dist. Comp. Network [DLM1]
- 030.rrr.rrr.rrr DCN-UCL UCL Dist. Comp. Network [PK]
- 031.rrr.rrr.rrr BBN-SAT-TEST BBN SATNET Test Network [DM11]
- 032.rrr.rrr.rrr UCL-CR1 UCL Cambridge Ring 1 [PK]
- 033.rrr.rrr.rrr UCL-CR2 UCL Cambridge Ring 2 [PK]
- 034.rrr.rrr.rrr MATNET Mobile Access Terminal Net [DM11]
- 035.rrr.rrr.rrr NULL UCL/RSRE Null Network [BD2]
- 036.rrr.rrr.rrr SU-NET Stanford University Ethernet [MRC]
- 037.rrr.rrr.rrr DECNET Digital Equipment Network [DRL]
- 038.rrr.rrr.rrr DECNET-TEST Test Digital Equipment Net [DRL]
- 039.rrr.rrr.rrr SRINET SRI Local Network [GEOF]
- 040.rrr.rrr.rrr CISLNET CISL Multics Network [CH2]
- 041.rrr.rrr.rrr BBN-LN-TEST BBN Local Network Testbed [KTP]
- 042.rrr.rrr.rrr S1NET LLL-S1-NET [EAK]
- 043.rrr.rrr.rrr INTELPOST COMSAT INTELPOST [DLM1]
- 044.rrr.rrr.rrr AMPRNET Amateur Radio Experiment Net [HM]

== See also ==
- Classless Inter-Domain Routing (CIDR)
- List of countries by IPv4 address allocation
