= List of countries by IPv4 address allocation =

This is a list of countries by IPv4 address allocation.

The Internet Assigned Numbers Authority (IANA) distributes large blocks of addresses to regional Internet registries (RIRs), which then assign them to national Internet registries and local Internet registries within their respective service regions. While IPv4 allows for a theoretical maximum of 2^{32} addresses (approximately 4.3 billion), the number available for public use is smaller due to reserved blocks for private and special purposes.

== Table ==
#	Location	IP addresses	%	Population (Note: Regions (Åland Islands, British Indian Ocean Territory, Norfolk Island, Svalbard and Jan Mayen, Christmas Island, Cocos (Keeling) Islands, French Southern and Antarctic Lands, Pitcairn Islands, South Georgia and the South Sandwich Islands) not surveyed by the United Nations population source use another source instead.)	IP addresses per 1000
	(total world allocation)	3,686,475,740	100	8,091,734,930	456
1	United States	1,611,297,420	43.71	343,477,335	4,691
2	China	343,125,576	9.31	1,422,584,933	241
3	Japan	189,145,768	5.13	124,370,947	1,521
4	United Kingdom	134,054,832	3.64	68,682,962	1,952
5	Germany	124,185,676	3.37	84,548,231	1,469
6	South Korea	112,495,296	3.05	51,748,739	2,174
7	Brazil	87,096,200	2.36	211,140,729	413
8	France	82,053,600	2.23	66,438,822	1,235
9	Canada	67,921,556	1.84	39,299,105	1,728
10	Italy	54,020,088	1.47	59,499,453	908
11	Netherlands	48,112,552	1.31	18,092,524	2,659
12	Australia	46,444,728	1.26	26,451,124	1,756
13	Russia	44,859,860	1.22	145,440,500	308
14	India	41,624,148	1.13	1,438,069,596	29
15	Taiwan	35,715,484	0.97	23,317,145	1,532
16	Spain	32,317,160	0.88	47,911,579	675
17	Sweden	31,070,628	0.84	10,551,494	2,945
18	Mexico	28,989,412	0.79	129,739,759	223
19	South Africa	27,077,224	0.73	63,212,384	428
20	Singapore	26,590,876	0.72	5,789,090	4,593
21	Switzerland	25,433,100	0.69	8,870,561	2,867
22	Egypt	24,147,252	0.66	114,535,772	211
23	Poland	19,971,716	0.54	38,762,844	515
24	Argentina	19,445,316	0.53	45,538,401	427
25	Indonesia	18,984,372	0.51	281,190,067	68
26	Colombia	17,373,224	0.47	52,321,152	332
27	Turkey	16,702,740	0.45	87,270,501	191
28	Vietnam	16,411,204	0.45	100,352,192	164
29	Norway	15,545,680	0.42	5,519,167	2,817
30	Finland	13,709,400	0.37	5,601,185	2,448
	Hong Kong	13,155,600	0.36	7,442,734	1,768
31	Belgium	12,353,044	0.34	11,712,893	1,055
32	Morocco	12,271,580	0.33	37,712,505	325
33	Denmark	11,968,444	0.32	5,948,136	2,012
34	Iran	11,297,028	0.31	90,608,707	125
35	Austria	11,235,160	0.30	9,130,429	1,231
36	Ireland	11,105,124	0.30	5,196,630	2,137
37	Saudi Arabia	10,720,264	0.29	33,264,292	322
38	Chile	10,038,880	0.27	19,658,835	511
39	Czech Republic	9,521,764	0.26	10,809,716	881
40	Ukraine	9,265,812	0.25	37,732,836	246
41	Thailand	9,189,444	0.25	71,702,435	128
42	Israel	7,987,856	0.22	9,256,314	863
43	Tunisia	7,876,420	0.21	12,200,431	646
44	Romania	7,756,600	0.21	19,118,479	406
45	Seychelles	7,471,836	0.20	127,951	58,396
46	Venezuela	6,706,428	0.18	28,300,854	237
47	Malaysia	6,700,300	0.18	35,126,298	191
48	Portugal	6,692,684	0.18	10,430,738	642
49	New Zealand	6,576,072	0.18	5,172,836	1,271
50	Kenya	6,182,464	0.17	55,339,003	112
51	Philippines	6,136,908	0.17	114,891,199	53
52	Hungary	5,914,408	0.16	9,686,463	611
53	Greece	5,719,476	0.16	10,242,908	558
54	United Arab Emirates	5,583,136	0.15	10,642,081	525
55	Pakistan	5,450,100	0.15	247,504,495	22
56	Mauritius	4,779,612	0.13	1,273,588	3,753
57	Algeria	4,763,008	0.13	46,164,219	103
58	Bulgaria	4,290,248	0.12	6,795,803	631
59	Kazakhstan	3,274,232	0.09	20,330,104	161
60	Peru	3,242,752	0.09	33,845,617	96
61	Nigeria	3,173,176	0.09	227,882,945	14
62	Slovakia	2,737,684	0.07	5,518,055	496
63	Ecuador	2,716,544	0.07	17,980,083	151
64	Slovenia	2,673,328	0.07	2,118,396	1,262
65	Lithuania	2,638,876	0.07	2,854,099	925
66	Uruguay	2,445,736	0.07	3,388,081	722
67	Croatia	2,343,896	0.06	3,896,023	602
68	Costa Rica	2,331,940	0.06	5,105,525	457
69	Serbia	2,293,096	0.06	6,773,201	339
70	Ghana	2,191,828	0.06	33,787,914	65
71	Bangladesh	2,005,892	0.05	171,466,990	12
72	Kuwait	1,906,664	0.05	4,838,782	394
73	Sudan	1,890,932	0.05	50,042,791	38
74	Latvia	1,843,756	0.05	1,882,396	979
75	Luxembourg	1,833,868	0.05	665,098	2,757
76	Belarus	1,789,820	0.05	9,115,680	196
77	Panama	1,734,792	0.05	4,458,759	389
78	Ivory Coast	1,712,196	0.05	31,165,654	55
79	Zambia	1,647,204	0.04	20,723,965	79
80	Dominican Republic	1,615,252	0.04	11,331,265	143
81	Uganda	1,433,740	0.04	48,656,601	29
82	Estonia	1,310,620	0.04	1,367,196	959
83	Georgia	1,285,184	0.03	3,807,492	338
84	Syria	1,276,856	0.03	23,594,623	54
85	Angola	1,270,256	0.03	36,749,906	35
86	Cyprus	1,267,832	0.03	1,344,976	943
87	Moldova	1,246,208	0.03	3,067,070	406
88	Bolivia	1,169,452	0.03	12,244,159	96
89	Paraguay	1,152,432	0.03	6,844,146	168
90	Tanzania	1,076,812	0.03	66,617,606	16
91	Oman	950,996	0.03	5,049,269	188
92	Iceland	894,364	0.02	387,558	2,308
93	Palestine	874,272	0.02	5,409,202	162
94	Qatar	843,604	0.02	2,979,082	283
95	Bosnia and Herzegovina	788,336	0.02	3,185,073	248
96	Azerbaijan	767,228	0.02	10,318,207	74
	Puerto Rico	761,764	0.02	3,242,023	235
97	Malta	690,800	0.02	532,956	1,296
98	North Macedonia	685,508	0.02	1,831,802	374
99	Armenia	668,456	0.02	2,943,393	227
100	El Salvador	663,728	0.02	6,309,624	105
101	Jordan	645,656	0.02	11,439,213	56
102	Guatemala	642,748	0.02	18,124,838	35
103	Cameroon	599,572	0.02	28,372,687	21
104	Madagascar	578,460	0.02	31,195,932	19
105	Nepal	574,736	0.02	29,694,614	19
106	Lebanon	567,096	0.02	5,773,493	98
107	Sri Lanka	564,140	0.02	22,971,617	25
108	Malawi	554,816	0.02	21,104,482	26
109	Trinidad and Tobago	544,532	0.01	1,502,932	362
110	Honduras	534,528	0.01	10,644,851	50
111	Albania	484,756	0.01	2,811,655	172
112	Namibia	465,008	0.01	2,963,095	157
113	Libya	448,528	0.01	7,305,659	61
114	Bahrain	445,476	0.01	1,569,666	284
115	Mozambique	444,464	0.01	33,635,160	13
116	Iraq	443,400	0.01	45,074,049	10
	Réunion	424,604	0.01	874,883	485
117	Nicaragua	411,944	0.01	6,823,613	60
118	Cambodia	406,764	0.01	17,423,880	23
119	Senegal	404,080	0.01	18,077,573	22
120	Gabon	393,632	0.01	2,484,789	158
121	Ethiopia	368,580	0.01	128,691,692	3
122	Togo	353,728	0.01	9,304,337	38
	Macau	337,512	0.01	713,912	473
123	Burkina Faso	336,696	0.01	23,025,776	15
124	Uzbekistan	286,300	0.01	35,652,307	8
125	Rwanda	280,716	0.01	13,954,471	20
126	Gambia	272,808	0.01	2,697,845	101
127	Kyrgyzstan	269,952	0.01	7,073,516	38
128	Cuba	256,940	0.01	11,019,931	23
129	Myanmar	238,720	0.01	54,133,798	4
	Gibraltar	237,024	0.01	38,471	6,161
130	Yemen	233,352	0.01	39,390,799	6
131	Jamaica	223,032	0.01	2,839,786	79
	Guam	219,276	0.01	166,506	1,317
132	Brunei	216,168	0.01	458,949	471
133	Montenegro	209,200	0.01	633,552	330
	Curaçao	200,004	0.01	185,427	1,079
134	Antigua and Barbuda	180,312	0.00	93,316	1,932
135	Mongolia	180,240	0.00	3,431,932	53
136	Afghanistan	176,892	0.00	41,454,761	4
137	Democratic Republic of the Congo	175,568	0.00	105,789,731	2
138	Barbados	168,584	0.00	282,336	597
	British Virgin Islands	165,688	0.00	38,985	4,250
139	Belize	165,552	0.00	411,106	403
140	Botswana	161,852	0.00	2,480,244	65
	New Caledonia	161,352	0.00	289,870	557
141	Haiti	154,780	0.00	11,637,398	13
142	Benin	147,576	0.00	14,111,034	10
	Jersey	144,216	0.00	103,674	1,391
143	Fiji	142,700	0.00	924,145	154
144	Republic of the Congo	141,488	0.00	6,182,885	23
145	Bahamas	138,648	0.00	399,440	347
	Martinique	134,568	0.00	346,002	389
	Europe	131,064	0.00		(Note: Some RIPE NCC IP assignments list "EU" as the country; WHOIS queries are used to assign specific countries where possible, but unresolved cases remain as "European.")
	Isle of Man	129,048	0.00	84,165	1,533
	Guadeloupe	124,612	0.00	376,517	331
146	Lesotho	120,756	0.00	2,311,472	52
	United States Virgin Islands	118,460	0.00	85,701	1,382
	Aruba	111,820	0.00	107,939	1,036
	Bermuda	111,684	0.00	64,698	1,726
147	Liechtenstein	105,996	0.00	39,598	2,677
148	Zimbabwe	101,988	0.00	16,340,822	6
149	Maldives	93,764	0.00	525,994	178
150	Mali	92,564	0.00	23,769,127	4
151	Laos	87,580	0.00	7,664,993	11
152	Sierra Leone	82,844	0.00	8,460,512	10
153	Tajikistan	82,712	0.00	10,389,799	8
154	Suriname	81,608	0.00	628,886	130
	French Polynesia	75,444	0.00	281,118	268
155	Papua New Guinea	72,436	0.00	10,389,635	7
156	Guyana	68,808	0.00	826,353	83
157	Monaco	63,660	0.00	38,956	1,634
158	Andorra	57,256	0.00	80,856	708
159	Eswatini	54,176	0.00	1,230,506	44
160	Somalia	50,828	0.00	18,358,615	3
	Cayman Islands	48,276	0.00	73,038	661
161	Mauritania	46,284	0.00	5,022,441	9
162	Djibouti	46,052	0.00	1,152,944	40
163	Niger	45,008	0.00	26,159,867	2
	Faroe Islands	45,000	0.00	54,714	822
164	Bhutan	43,604	0.00	786,385	55
	Guernsey	40,608	0.00	64,017	634
165	Liberia	39,092	0.00	5,493,031	7
166	San Marino	38,832	0.00	33,733	1,151
167	Cape Verde	38,052	0.00	522,331	73
168	Guinea	38,048	0.00	14,405,468	3
169	Burundi	36,812	0.00	13,689,450	3
	Sint Maarten	34,252	0.00	42,749	801
	Greenland	34,204	0.00	55,922	612
170	South Sudan	26,252	0.00	11,483,374	2
171	Chad	25,776	0.00	19,319,064	1
	Caribbean Netherlands	24,784	0.00	29,898	829
172	Timor-Leste	23,436	0.00	1,384,286	17
	French Guiana	22,504	0.00	303,402	74
173	Turkmenistan	21,980	0.00	7,364,438	3
174	Saint Lucia	20,656	0.00	179,285	115
175	Samoa	19,904	0.00	216,663	92
176	Saint Kitts and Nevis	19,648	0.00	46,758	420
177	Equatorial Guinea	17,880	0.00	1,847,549	10
178	Vanuatu	16,304	0.00	320,409	51
	Northern Mariana Islands	15,336	0.00	45,143	340
179	Dominica	14,536	0.00	66,510	219
180	Solomon Islands	14,288	0.00	800,005	18
181	Tonga	11,476	0.00	104,597	110
182	Grenada	10,952	0.00	117,081	94
183	Vatican City	10,736	0.00	496	21,645
	Turks and Caicos Islands	10,468	0.00	46,198	227
184	Nauru	10,212	0.00	11,875	860
185	Saint Vincent and the Grenadines	10,196	0.00	101,323	101
	Anguilla	9,692	0.00	14,410	673
186	São Tomé and Príncipe	9,208	0.00	230,871	40
187	Cook Islands	8,696	0.00	14,222	611
188	Federated States of Micronesia	8,684	0.00	112,630	77
189	Tuvalu	8,188	0.00	9,816	834
190	Comoros	7,152	0.00	850,387	8
	Falkland Islands	7,124	0.00	3,477	2,049
191	Palau	6,128	0.00	17,727	346
192	Guinea-Bissau	5,620	0.00	2,153,339	3
193	Central African Republic	5,356	0.00	5,152,421	1
	American Samoa	5,112	0.00	47,521	108
	Saint Pierre and Miquelon	4,600	0.00	5,681	810
194	Marshall Islands	4,588	0.00	38,827	118
195	Eritrea	4,092	0.00	3,470,390	1
	Åland Islands	4,092	0.00	26,711	153
196	Kiribati	4,076	0.00	132,530	31
	Wallis and Futuna	3,572	0.00	11,370	314
	Saint Martin	3,556	0.00	27,515	129
	British Indian Ocean Territory	3,064	0.00	4,000	766
	Tokelau	3,052	0.00	2,397	1,273
197	Niue	2,040	0.00	1,817	1,123
	Montserrat	1,272	0.00	4,420	288
198	North Korea	1,020	0.00	26,418,204	0
	Mayotte	1,020	0.00	316,015	3
	Norfolk Island	760	0.00	1,828	416
	Saint Barthélemy	756	0.00	11,085	68
199	Kosovo	0		1,700,031	
199	Western Sahara	0		579,729	
	Saint Helena, Ascension and Tristan da Cunha	0		5,289	
	Svalbard and Jan Mayen	0		2,550	
	Christmas Island	0		1,500	
	Cocos (Keeling) Islands	0		628	
	French Southern and Antarctic Lands	0		140	
	Pitcairn Islands	0		46	
	South Georgia and the South Sandwich Islands	0		30	
	Bouvet Island	0		0	
	Heard Island and McDonald Islands	0		0	
	United States Minor Outlying Islands	0		0	

== See also ==
- IPv4 address exhaustion
- List of assigned /8 IPv4 address blocks
