= Montevideo Statement on the Future of Internet Cooperation =

The Montevideo Statement on the Future of Internet Cooperation was released on 7 October 2013 by the leaders of a number of organizations involved in coordinating the Internet's global technical infrastructure. The statement was signed by the heads of the Internet Corporation for Assigned Names and Numbers (ICANN), the Internet Engineering Task Force, the Internet Architecture Board, the World Wide Web Consortium, the Internet Society, and the five regional Internet address registries (African Network Information Center, American Registry for Internet Numbers, Asia-Pacific Network Information Centre, Latin America and Caribbean Internet Addresses Registry, and Réseaux IP Européens Network Coordination Centre). In large part, the statement is seen as a response to the ongoing NSA surveillance scandal. The leaders made four main points:

- They reinforced the importance of globally coherent Internet operations, and warned against Internet fragmentation at a national level. They expressed strong concern over the undermining of the trust and confidence of Internet users globally due to recent revelations of pervasive monitoring and surveillance.
- They identified the need for ongoing effort to address Internet Governance challenges, and agreed to catalyze community-wide efforts towards the evolution of global multistakeholder Internet cooperation.
- They called for accelerating the globalization of ICANN and IANA functions, towards an environment in which all stakeholders, including all governments, participate on an equal footing.
- They also called for the transition to IPv6 to remain a top priority globally. In particular Internet content providers must serve content with both IPv4 and IPv6 services, in order to be fully reachable on the global Internet.

== See also ==
- ICANN § Proposals for reform
- Internet governance
