= IPv4 address exhaustion =

Depletion of unallocated IPv4 addresses

IPv4 address exhaustion timeline

IPv4 address exhaustion was the continual depletion of the pool of available, unallocated IPv4 addresses for devices connected to the Internet, which began in the 1980s and concluded with the last addresses being allocated in 2019.

IPv4 was the standard Internet Protocol for all internet communications since its implementation with SATNET and ARPANET in the 1980s. Computer engineer Vint Cerf, who co-created the TCP/IP suite for establishing Internet communication protocols, stated that IPv4 was limited to a 32-bit address space as he believed that it would be enough for limited experimental use; being 32 bits meant that original Internet architecture had fewer than 4.3 billion addresses available.

Address depletion had been anticipated since the late 1980s, when the Internet started experiencing dramatic growth, and became a more pressing issue with the introduction of always-on devices and mobile devices. The anticipated shortage became a driving factor for creating and adopting several new technologies, including network address translation (NAT) and Classless Inter-Domain Routing (CIDR) in 1993; IPv6 was designed as a successor protocol and introduced in 1998, with its deployment ongoing. Both IPv4 and IPv6 coexist on the Internet.

Top-level exhaustion occurred on 31 January 2011, with the exhaustion of the Internet Assigned Numbers Authority’s (IANA) IPv4 address pool, excluding addresses reserved for IPv6 transition; subsequent exhaustion for each of the five regional Internet registries’ (RIRs) address pools occurred on 15 April 2011 for Asia-Pacific (APNIC), 10 June 2014 for Latin America and the Caribbean (LACNIC), 24 September 2015 for North America (ARIN), 21 April 2017 for Africa (AfriNIC), and 25 November 2019 for Europe, Middle East and Central Asia (RIPE NCC).

These RIRs still allocate recovered addresses or addresses reserved for a special purpose. Individual ISPs still have pools of unassigned IP addresses, and could recycle addresses no longer needed by subscribers.

== IP addressing ==
Every node of an Internet Protocol (IP) network, such as a computer, router, or network printer, is assigned an IP address for each network interface, used to locate and identify the node in communications with other nodes on the network. Internet Protocol version 4 provides 2^{32} (4,294,967,296) addresses. However, large blocks of IPv4 addresses are reserved for special uses and are unavailable for public allocation.

The IPv4 addressing structure provides an insufficient number of publicly routable addresses to provide a distinct address to every Internet device or service. This problem has been mitigated for some time by changes in the address allocation and routing infrastructure of the Internet. The transition from classful network addressing to Classless Inter-Domain Routing delayed the exhaustion of addresses substantially. In addition, network address translation (NAT) permits Internet service providers and enterprises to masquerade private network address space with only one publicly routable IPv4 address on the Internet interface of a main Internet router, instead of allocating a public address to each network device.

The IP address space is managed globally by the Internet Assigned Numbers Authority (IANA), and by five regional Internet registries (RIRs) responsible in their designated territories for assignment to end users and local Internet registries, such as Internet service providers.

== Reasons for address depletion ==
While the primary reason for IPv4 address exhaustion was its 32-bit address space that limited it to under 4.3 billion unique addresses, several later technological developments and internet engineering would further limit the amount of available addresses through increased demand.

- Mobile devices: As IPv4 increasingly became the de facto standard for networked digital communication and the cost of embedding substantial computing power into hand-held devices dropped, mobile phones have become viable Internet hosts. New specifications of 4G devices require IPv6 addressing.
- Always-on connections: Throughout the 1990s, the predominant mode of consumer Internet access was telephone modem dial-up. The rapid increase in the number of the dial-up networks increased address consumption rates, although it was common that the modem pools, and as a result, the pool of assigned IP addresses, were shared amongst a large customer base. By 2007, however, broadband Internet access had begun to exceed 50% penetration in many markets. Broadband connections are always active, as the gateway devices (routers, broadband modems) are rarely turned off, so that the address uptake by Internet service providers continued at an accelerating pace.
- Adoption of the Internet: When the World Wide Web was made public in 1993, only around 2.27% of the US population were internet users; this would increase to 43% by 2000, and 74.5% by 2015. The proliferation of the internet both within the United States and globally would increase traffic and demand for IP addresses.
- Inefficient address use: Organizations that obtained IP addresses in the 1980s were often allocated far more addresses than they actually required, because the initial classful network allocation method was inadequate to reflect reasonable usage; large companies and universities were often assigned class A address blocks with over 16 million IPv4 addresses each, because the next smaller allocation unit, class B blocks, only had 65,536 addresses which was too small for their intended deployments. Many organizations also continue to use public IP addresses for devices that were not accessible outside their local network. Subnetworks also made it difficult to use all the addresses in a block.

== Mitigation efforts ==
Efforts to delay address space exhaustion started with the recognition of the problem in the early 1990s, and the introduction of a number of stop-gap refinements to make the existing structure operate more efficiently, such as CIDR methods and strict usage-based allocation policies.

The Internet Engineering Task Force (IETF) created the Routing and Addressing Group (ROAD) in November 1991 to respond to the scalability problem caused by the classful network allocation system in place at the time.

IPv6, the successor technology to IPv4, was designed to address this problem. It supports approximately 3.4×10^{38} network addresses. Although as of 2008 the predicted depletion was already approaching its final stages, most providers of Internet services and software vendors were just beginning IPv6 deployment at that time.

Other mitigation efforts and technologies include:

- use of network address translation (NAT) which allows a private network to use one public IP address and permitting private addresses in the private network;
- use of private network addressing;
- name-based virtual hosting of web sites;
- tighter control by regional Internet registries on the allocation of addresses to local Internet registries;
- network renumbering and subnetting to reclaim large blocks of address space allocated in the early days of the Internet, when the Internet used inefficient classful network addressing.

== Exhaustion dates and impact ==
Exhaustion of IPv4 addresses since 1995

IPv4 addresses allocation rate per RIR

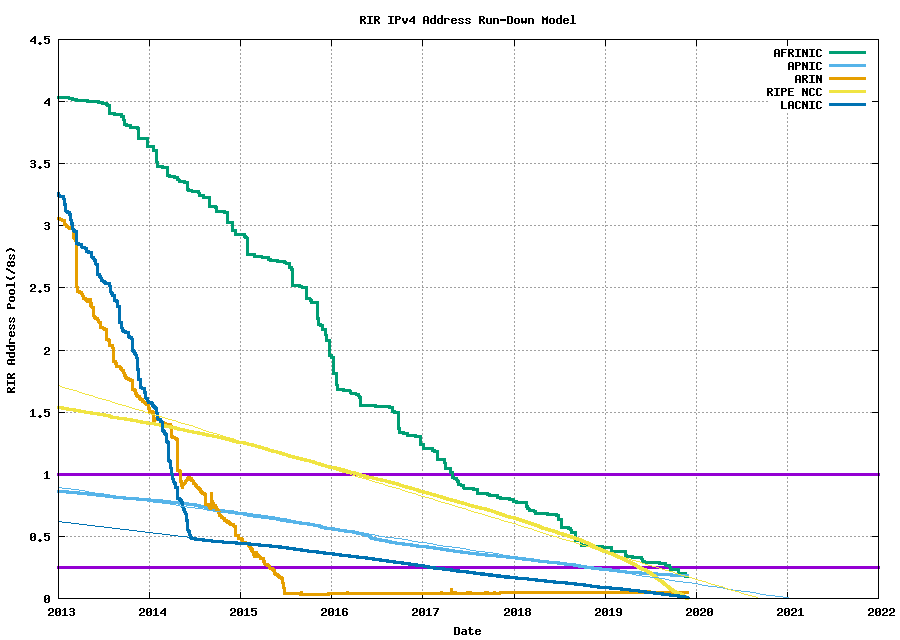
Geoff Huston's projection of the evolution of the IP pool for each RIR

On 31 January 2011, the last two unreserved IANA /8 address blocks were allocated to APNIC according to RIR request procedures. This left five reserved but unallocated /8 blocks. In accord with ICANN policies, IANA proceeded to allocate one of those five /8s to each RIR, exhausting the IANA pool, at a ceremony and press conference on 3 February 2011.

The various legacy address blocks with administration historically split among the RIRs were distributed to the RIRs in February 2011.

APNIC was the first regional Internet registry to run out of freely allocated IPv4 addresses, on 15 April 2011. This date marked the point where not everyone who needed an IPv4 address could be allocated one. As a consequence of this exhaustion, end-to-end connectivity as required by specific applications will not be universally available on the Internet until IPv6 is fully implemented. However, IPv6 hosts cannot directly communicate with IPv4 hosts, and have to communicate using special gateway services. This means that general-purpose computers must still have IPv4 access, for example through NAT64, in addition to the new IPv6 address, which is more effort than just supporting IPv4 or IPv6.

In early 2011, only 16–26% of computers were IPv6 capable, while only 0.2% preferred IPv6 addressing with many using transition methods such as Teredo tunneling. About 0.15% of the top million websites were IPv6 accessible in 2011. Complicating matters, 0.027% to 0.12% of visitors could not reach dual-stack sites, but a larger percentage (0.27%) could not reach IPv4-only sites. IPv4 exhaustion mitigation technologies include IPv4 address sharing to access IPv4 content, IPv6 dual-stack implementation, protocol translation to access IPv4 and IPv6-addressed content, and bridging and tunneling to bypass single protocol routers. Early signs of accelerated IPv6 adoption after IANA exhaustion are evident.

=== Regional exhaustion ===
All the RIRs have set aside a small pool of IP addresses for the transition to IPv6 (for example carrier-grade NAT), from which each LIR can typically get at most 1024 in total. ARIN and LACNIC reserves the last /10 for IPv6 transition. APNIC, and RIPE NCC have reserved the last obtained /8 block for IPv6 transition. AFRINIC reserves a /11 block for this purpose. When only this last block remains, the RIR's supply of IPv4 addresses is said to be "exhausted".

Regional Internet registries

A timeline for IPv4 exhaustion in IANA and the RIRs.

APNIC was the first RIR to restrict allocations to 1024 addresses for each member, as its pool reached critical levels of one /8 block on 14 April 2011. The APNIC RIR is responsible for address allocation in the area of fastest Internet expansion, including the emerging markets of China and India.

RIPE NCC, the regional Internet registry for Europe, was the second RIR to deplete its address pool on 14 September 2012.

On 10 June 2014, LACNIC, the regional Internet registry for Latin America and the Caribbean, was the third RIR to deplete its address pool.

ARIN was exhausted on 24 September 2015. ARIN has been unable to allocate large requests since July 2015, but smaller requests were still being met. After IANA exhaustion, IPv4 address space requests became subject to additional restrictions at ARIN, and became even more restrictive after reaching the last /8 in April 2014.

On 31 March 2017, AFRINIC became the last regional Internet registry to run down to its last /8 block of IPv4 addresses (102/8), thus triggering the first phase of its IPv4 exhaustion policy. "On 13 January 2020, AFRINIC approved an IPv4 prefix that resulted in no more than a /11 of non-reserved space to be available in the Final /8," which triggered its IPv4 Exhaustion Phase 2.

On 25 November 2019, RIPE NCC announced that it had made its "final /22 IPv4 allocation from the last remaining addresses in our available pool. We have now run out of IPv4 addresses." RIPE NCC will continue to allocate IPv4 addresses, but only "from organisations that have gone out of business or are closed, or from networks that return addresses they no longer need. These addresses will be allocated to our members (LIRs) according to their position on a new waiting list…" The announcement also called for support for the implementation of the IPv6 roll-out.

==== Impact of APNIC RIR exhaustion and LIR exhaustion ====
Systems that require inter-continental connectivity will have to deal with exhaustion mitigation already due to APNIC exhaustion. At APNIC, existing LIRs could apply for twelve months stock before exhaustion when they were using more than 80% of allocated space allocated to them. Since 15 April 2011, the date when APNIC reached its last /8 block, each (current or future) member will only be able to get one allocation of 1024 addresses (a /22 block) once. As the slope of the APNIC pool line on the "Geoff Huston's projection of the evolution of the IP pool for each RIR" chart to the right shows, the last /8 block would have been emptied within one month without this policy. Under this APNIC policy, each current or future member could receive only one /22 block from this last /8 (there are 16,384 /22 blocks in a /8 block). Based on the membership growth rate at the time of the 2011 exhaustion, APNIC initially expected this final /8 block to last for many years. Following the subsequent redistribution of recovered space, APNIC began distributing an additional /22 to each member upon request.

The 1,024 addresses in the /22 block can be used by APNIC members to supply NAT44 or NAT64 as a service on an IPv6 network. However at a new large ISP, 1,024 IPv4 addresses might not be enough to provide IPv4 connectivity to all the customers due to the limited number of ports available per IPv4 address.

The regional Internet registries (RIRs) for Asia (APNIC) and North America have a policy called the Inter-RIR IPv4 Address Transfer Policy, which allows IPv4 addresses to be transferred from North America to Asia. The ARIN policy was implemented on 31 July 2012.

IPv4 broker businesses have been established to facilitate these transfers.

=== Notable exhaustion advisories ===
Estimates of the time of complete IPv4 address exhaustion varied widely in the early 2000s. In 2003, Paul Wilson (director of APNIC) stated that, based on then-current rates of deployment, the available space would last for one or two decades. In September 2005, a report by Cisco Systems suggested that the pool of available addresses would deplete in as little as 4 to 5 years. In the last year before exhaustion, IPv4 allocations were accelerating, resulting in exhaustion trending to earlier dates.

- On 21 May 2007, the American Registry for Internet Numbers (ARIN), the RIR for the US, Canada and a number of island states (mostly in the Caribbean), advised the Internet community that, due to the expected exhaustion in 2010, "migration to IPv6 numbering resources is necessary for any applications which require ongoing availability from ARIN of contiguous IP numbering resources". "Applications" include general connectivity between devices on the Internet, as some devices only have an IPv6 address allocated.
- On 20 June 2007, the Latin American and Caribbean Internet Addresses Registry (LACNIC), advised "preparing its regional networks for IPv6" by 1 January 2011, for the exhaustion of IPv4 addresses "in three years time".
- On 26 June 2007, the Asia-Pacific Network Information Centre (APNIC), the RIR for the Pacific and Asia, endorsed a statement by the Japan Network Information Center (JPNIC) that to continue the expansion and development of the Internet a move towards an IPv6-based Internet is advised. This, with an eye on the expected exhaustion around 2010, would create a great restriction on the Internet.
- On 26 October 2007, the Réseaux IP Européens Network Coordination Centre (RIPE NCC), the RIR for Europe, the Middle East, and parts of Central Asia, endorsed a statement by the RIPE community urging "the widespread deployment of IPv6 be made a high priority by all stakeholders".
- On 15 April 2009, ARIN sent a letter to all CEO/Executives of companies who have IPv4 addresses allocated informing them that ARIN expects the IPv4 space will be depleted within the next two years.
- In May 2009, the RIPE NCC launched IPv6ActNow.org to help explain "IPv6 in terms everyone can understand and providing a variety of useful information aimed at promoting the global adoption of IPv6".
- On 25 August 2009, ARIN announced a joint series event in the Caribbean region to push for the implementation of IPv6. ARIN reported at this time that less than 10.9% of IPv4 address space is remaining.
- World IPv6 Day was an event sponsored and organized by the Internet Society and several large content providers to test public IPv6 deployment. It started at 00:00 UTC on 8 June 2011 and ended at 23:59 the same day. The test primarily consisted of websites publishing AAAA records, allowing IPv6 capable hosts to connect to these sites using IPv6, and for misconfigured networks to be corrected.
- World IPv6 Launch Day occurred on 6 June 2012, following the success of World IPv6 Day a year earlier. It involved many more participants and had a more ambitious goal of permanently enabling IPv6 on participant organizations' networks.
- On 24 September 2015 ARIN declared exhaustion of the ARIN IPv4 addresses pool.
- On 25 November 2019, RIPE NCC announced that it had made its "final /22 IPv4 allocation from the last remaining addresses in our available pool."
- On 21 August 2020, LACNIC announced that it had made its final IPv4 allocation.

== Post-exhaustion mitigation ==
By 2008 policy planning for the end-game and post-exhaustion era was underway. Several proposals have been discussed to delay shortages of IPv4 addresses:

=== Reclamation of unused IPv4 space ===
Before and during the time when classful network design was still used as allocation model, large blocks of IP addresses were allocated to some organizations. Since the use of CIDR the Internet Assigned Numbers Authority (IANA) could potentially reclaim these ranges and reissue the addresses in smaller blocks. ARIN, RIPE NCC and APNIC have a transfer policy, such that addresses can get returned, with the purpose to be reassigned to a specific recipient. However, it can be expensive in terms of cost and time to renumber a large network, so these organizations are likely to object, with legal conflicts possible. However, even if all of these were reclaimed, it would only result in postponing the date of address exhaustion.

Similarly, IP address blocks have been allocated to entities that no longer exist and some allocated IP address blocks or large portions of them have never been used. No strict accounting of IP address allocations has been undertaken, and it would take a significant amount of effort to track down which addresses really are unused, as many are in use only on intranets.

Some address space previously reserved by IANA has been added to the available pool. There have been proposals to use the class E network range of IPv4 addresses (which would add 268.4 million IP addresses to the available pool) but many computer and router operating systems and firmware do not allow the use of these addresses. For this reason, the proposals have sought not to designate the class E space for public assignment, but instead propose to permit its private use for networks that require more address space than is currently available through RFC 1918.

Several organizations have returned large blocks of IP addresses. Notably, Stanford University relinquished their Class A IP address block in 2000, making 16 million IP addresses available. Other organizations that have done so include the United States Department of Defense, BBN Technologies, and Interop.

=== Markets in IP addresses ===
The creation of markets to buy and sell IPv4 addresses has been considered to be a solution to the problem of IPv4 scarcity and a means of redistribution. The primary benefits of an IPv4 address market are that it allows buyers to maintain undisrupted local network functionality. IPv6 adoption, while in progress, is currently still in early stages. It requires a significant investment of resources, and poses incompatibility issues with IPv4, as well as certain security and stability risks.

- The creation of a market in IPv4 addresses would only delay the practical exhaustion of the IPv4 address space for a relatively short time, since the public Internet is still growing.
- The concept of legal ownership of IP addresses as property is explicitly denied by ARIN and RIPE NCC policy documents and by the ARIN Registration Services Agreement, although ownership rights have been postulated based on a letter from the National Science Foundation General Counsel. NSF later indicated that the view was not official, and a statement from the Department of Commerce was subsequently issued indicating that "The USG participates in the development of and is supportive of the policies, processes, and procedures agreed upon by the Internet technical community through ARIN."
- Ad-hoc trading in addresses could lead to fragmented patterns of routing that could increase the size of the global routing table, potentially causing problems for routers with insufficient routing memory resources.
- Microsoft bought 666,624 IPv4 addresses from Nortel's liquidation sale for 7.5 million dollars in a deal brokered by Addrex. Before exhaustion, Microsoft could have obtained addresses from ARIN without charge, provided that, as per ARIN policy, Microsoft could present ARIN with a need for them. The success of this transfer was contingent on Microsoft successfully presenting ARIN with such a justification. The purchase provided Microsoft with a supply that was sufficient for their claimed needs for growth over the next 12 months, rather than for a 3-months' period as is normally requested from ARIN.

=== Transition mechanisms ===
As the IPv4 address pool depletes, some ISPs will not be able to provide globally routable IPv4 addresses to customers. Nevertheless, customers are likely to require access to services on the IPv4 Internet. Several technologies have been developed for providing IPv4 service over an IPv6 access network.

In ISP-level IPv4 NAT, ISPs may implement IPv4 network address translation within their networks and assign private IPv4 addresses to customers. This approach is referred to as carrier-grade NAT (CGNAT), and may allow customers to keep using existing hardware. However, the allocation of private IPv4 addresses to customers may conflict with private IP allocations on the customer networks. Furthermore, some ISPs may have to divide their network into subnets to allow them to reuse private IPv4 addresses, complicating network administration. There are also concerns that features of consumer-grade NAT such as DMZs, STUN, UPnP and application-level gateways might not be available at the ISP level. ISP-level NAT may result in multiple-level address translation which is likely to further complicate the use of technologies such as port forwarding used to run Internet servers within private networks. Some estimates for NAT argue that US ISPs have 5-10 times the number of IPs they need in order to serve their existing customers, suggesting there might not be a need for CGNAT at all in some cases.

NAT64 translates IPv6 traffic from clients to IPv4 traffic and vice versa. This avoids the need to provision any IPv4 addresses to clients and allows clients that only support IPv6 to access IPv4 resources. However, this approach requires a special NAT64 translator along with a DNS server with DNS64 capability, and cannot support IPv4-only client devices.

DS-Lite (Dual-Stack Light) uses tunnels from the customer premises equipment to a network address translator at the ISP. The consumer premises equipment encapsulates the IPv4 packets in an IPv6 wrapper and sends them to a host known as the AFTR element. The AFTR element de-encapsulates the packets and performs network address translation before sending them to the public Internet. The NAT in the AFTR uses the IPv6 address of the client in its NAT mapping table. This means that different clients can use the same private IPv4 addresses, therefore avoiding the need for allocating private IPv4 IP addresses to customers or using multiple NATs.

Address plus Port allows stateless sharing of public IP addresses based on TCP/UDP port numbers. Each node is allocated both an IPv4 address and a range of port numbers to use. Other nodes may be allocated the same IPv4 address but a different range of ports. The technique avoids the need for stateful address translation mechanisms in the core of the network, thus leaving end users in control of their own address translation.

== Long-term solution ==
Deployment of IPv6 is the standards-based solution to the IPv4 address shortage. IPv6 is endorsed and implemented by all Internet technical standards bodies and network equipment vendors. It encompasses many design improvements, including the replacement of the 32-bit IPv4 address format with a 128-bit address which provides an addressing space without limitations for the foreseeable future. IPv6 has been in active production deployment since June 2006, after organized worldwide testing and evaluation in the 6bone project ceased. Interoperability for hosts using only IPv4 protocols is implemented with a variety of IPv6 transition mechanisms.

== See also ==
- List of assigned /8 IPv4 address blocks
- 512K Day – an event in 2014, involving the exhaustion of the default allocation of hardware routing slots on many routers
