= Address pool =

Set of addresses in the IP address allocation hierarchy

In the context of the Internet addressing structure, an address pool is a set of Internet Protocol addresses available at any level in the IP address allocation hierarchy. At the top level, the IP address pool is managed by the Internet Assigned Numbers Authority (IANA). The total IPv4 address pool contains 4294967296 (2^{32}) addresses, while the size of the IPv6 address pool is 2^{128} (340282366920938463463374607431768211456) addresses.

In the context of application design, an address pool may be the availability of a set of addresses (IP address, MAC address) available to an application that is shared among its users, or available for allocation to users, such as in host configurations with the Dynamic Host Configuration Protocol (DHCP).

== See also ==
- Dynamic Host Configuration Protocol
- IPv4 address exhaustion
- List of assigned /8 IPv4 address blocks
