= Valeria Betancourt =

Ecuadorian sociologist

- Born: 1970 (age 55–56); Quito
- Occupation: human right defender

Valeria Betancourt (born in Quito in 1970) is an Ecuadorian sociologist, human rights defender and pioneer in the use of information and communication technologies (ICT) to promote the development and empowerment of citizens in Latin America and globally.

== Biography ==
Since 2003, Betancourt has worked at the Association for Progressive Communications, where she leads the global information and communication policy program. Her work is focused on research, policy advocacy, and movement building in the areas of access, human rights, and Internet governance.

As one of the founders of the Latin American and Caribbean Preparatory Meeting for the Latin American and Caribbean Internet Governance Forum (LACIGF), Valeria Betancourt has played a central role in regionalizing internet governance debates and processes in Latin America.

During the 2016 Ecuador earthquake, she was one of the driving forces behind the collaborative mapping initiative Mapa Desastre Ecuadorto to channel the necessary aid to different parts of the country.

== Acknowledgements ==
From 2010 to 2012, Betancourt was selected to represent Latin American civil society in the Multi-Stakeholder Advisory Group of the Internet Governance Forum. In 2012 she received the LACNIC Lifetime Achievement Award,

== Notable publications ==
- "El acceso a internet: habilitador del ejercicio de derechos humanos", in Regulación de Internet y derechos digitales en Ecuador. Juan Pablo Albán Alencastro ... [and fourteen others]; general editors, Daniela Salazar, Daniela Viteri. Quito : Editorial USFQ (2016).
- "Internet for promoting, guaranteeing and exercising human rights and fundamental freedoms", in FRIDA 10 years contributing to development in Latin America and the Caribbean. Editors: Jesús Martínez and Lara Robledo, LACNIC and Seed Alliance (2015).
- "ICT for development milestones and approaches in Latin American and the Caribbean", in ENABLING OPENNESS. The future of the information society in Latin America and the Caribbean. Editors: Bruce Girard and Fernando Perini, Fundación Comunica and IDRC (2013).
- "Citizen participation in the age of the information society", in ENABLING OPENNESS. The future of the information society in Latin America and the Caribbean. Editors: Bruce Girard and Fernando Perini, Fundación Comunica and IDRC (2013).
- "Internet Rights in Ecuador : the possible triumph of activists? « Digital Rights".
- "Human rights online: an agenda still pending for civil society in Latin America and the Caribbean", in Cuestión de Derechos, ADC's magazine (2013).
- Cyberactivism: Utopia or possibility of resistance and transformation in the era of the uninformed information society?, in Chasqui Revista Latinoamericana de Comunicación (2011).
- "National Report for Ecuador", in Global Information Society Watch (2007).
- "What is a national information policy?" and "Objectives and areas of action of the national information policy" in Towards the construction of national information policies: the Latin American experience. Editor: Isidro Fernández-Aballi. Kingston. UNESCO (2007)
