= Australian Network Information Centre =

The Australian Network Information Centre (AUNIC) was the national Internet registry for Australia from 1993 to 2001. In June 2001, AUNIC was disbanded and its responsibilities transferred to the Asia-Pacific Network Information Centre (APNIC), which serves the entire Asia-Pacific region.

The technical role of .au domain registry is performed by Identity Digital Australia, overseen by industry regulator auDA.
