= China Internet Network Information Center =

Public institution for managing .cn domain name

- 中国互联网络信息中心
- Formation: June 3, 1997; 29 years ago
- Type: Public institution
- Headquarters: Zhongguancun, Beijing
- Location: China
- Parent organization: Ministry of Industry and Information Technology
- Website: cnnic.cn

China Internet Network Information Center
- Simplified Chinese: 中国互联网络信息中心
- Traditional Chinese: 中國互聯網絡信息中心
Transcriptions
Standard Mandarin
- Hanyu Pinyin: Zhōngguó Hùlián Wǎngluò Xìnxī Zhōngxīn

The China Internet Network Information Center (CNNIC; 中国互联网络信息中心) is a public institution affiliated with the Ministry of Industry and Information Technology. Founded on 3 June 1997 and based in Zhongguancun, Beijing, the center manages the country code top-level domain name of the People's Republic of China, namely the .cn domain name.

== Responsibility areas ==
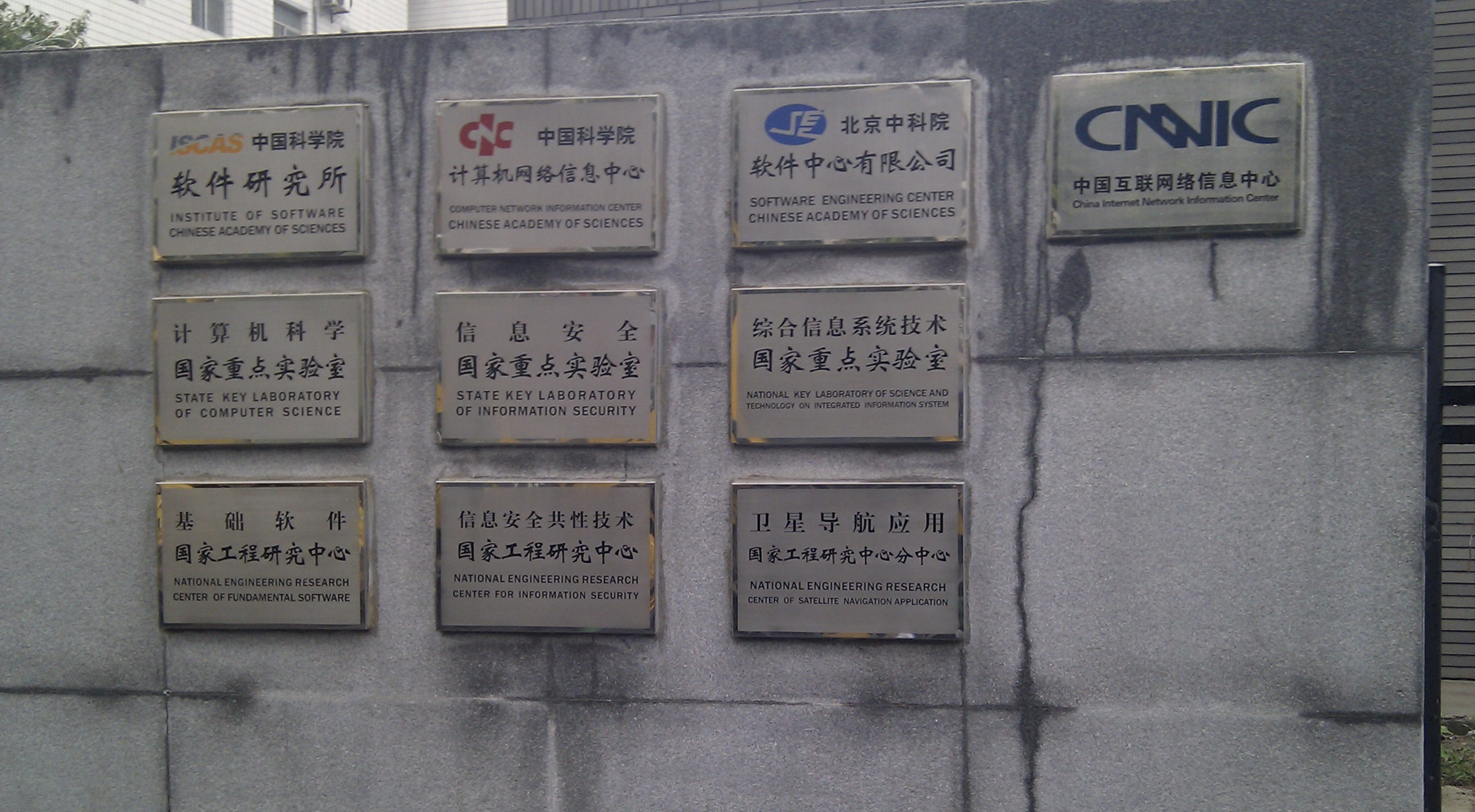
Signboards outside of China Internet Network Information Center

=== Domain name registry service ===
CNNIC is responsible for operating and administering China's domain name registry. CNNIC manages both the ".cn" country code top level domain and the Chinese domain name system (internationalized domain names that contain Chinese characters). As of April 2017, the total number of Chinese domain names was about 21 million.

As of January 2017, CNNIC only opened the CN domain to registered businesses, required supporting documentations for domain registration such as business license or personal ID, and suspended overseas registrars even for domestic registrants. CNNIC denied that it mandated existing personal domain names to be transferred to businesses. Trend Micro suggested this move was still not enough to stop modern security threats from the .cn domain.

=== IP address and Autonomous System number (AS number) allocation service ===
CNNIC allocates Internet Protocol (IP) addresses and AS Numbers to domestic Internet service providers and users. CNNIC is a National Internet Registry (NIR) acknowledged by the Asia-Pacific Network Information Center (APNIC). In late 2004 CNNIC launched an "IP Allocation Alliance" which simplified the procedures for obtaining IP addresses.

=== Catalogue Database Service ===
CNNIC is responsible for the creation and maintenance of the state top-level network catalog database. This database provides information on Internet users, web addresses, domain names, and AS numbers.

=== Technical research on Internet addressing ===
CNNIC conducts technical research and undertakes state technical projects based on its administrative and practical network technology experience.

=== Internet survey and statistics ===
CNNIC has conducted, and continues to conduct, surveys of Internet information resources. CNNIC maintains statistics on topics such as Internet bandwidth in China, Domain Name registrations, and Internet Development in China.

=== International liaison and policy research ===
As the national Network Information Center (NIC), CNNIC maintains cooperative relationships with other International Internet Communities, and works closely with NICs of other countries.

=== Secretariat of the Internet Policy and Resource Committee, Internet Society of China (ISC) ===
CNNIC serves as the Secretariat of the Internet Society of China's Internet Policy and Resource Committee. The Policy and Resource committee is in charge of tasks such as providing policy and legislation oriented suggestions to promote the growth of China's internet, facilitating the development and application of Internet resources and relevant technologies, and actively participating in the research work of domestic Internet development and administration policies.

=== Secretariat of the Anti-Phishing Alliance of China (APAC) ===
In July 2008, a broad alliance of Chinese online commerce stakeholders, including CNNIC, all major Chinese commercial banks and web hosting companies, founded the Anti-Phishing Alliance of China (APAC) in order to tackle phishing activities that abuse .cn sub-domain names. CNNIC also functions as the secretariat of APAC.

== Certificate issuance violations ==
In 2015, Google discovered that CNNIC had issued an intermediate CA certificate to an Egypt-based firm that used CNNIC's keys to impersonate Google domains. Google responded by removing CNNIC's root certificate from the certificate store in Google Chrome and all of Google's products.

As one of the parties involved in the incident, Google stating that

"As a result of a joint investigation of the events surrounding this incident by Google and CNNIC, we have decided that the CNNIC Root and EV CAs will no longer be recognized in Google products. This will take effect in a future Chrome update. To assist customers affected by this decision, for a limited time we will allow CNNIC's existing certificates to continue to be marked as trusted in Chrome, through the use of a publicly disclosed whitelist. While neither we nor CNNIC believe any further unauthorized digital certificates have been issued, nor do we believe the misissued certificates were used outside the limited scope of MCS Holdings' test network, CNNIC will be working to prevent any future incidents. CNNIC will implement Certificate Transparency for all of their certificates prior to any request for reinclusion. We applaud CNNIC on their proactive steps, and welcome them to reapply once suitable technical and procedural controls are in place."

Mozilla responded to the incident, stating that

"The Mozilla CA team believes that CNNIC's actions amount to egregious behaviour, and the violations of policy are greater in severity than those in previous incidents. CNNIC's decision to violate their own Certification Practice Statement is especially serious, and raises concerns that go beyond the immediate scope of the misissued intermediate certificate. After public discussion... we are planning to change Firefox's certificate validation code such that it refuses to trust any certificate issued by a CNNIC root with a notBefore date on or after 1 April 2015."
