= Scott Bradner =

American academic

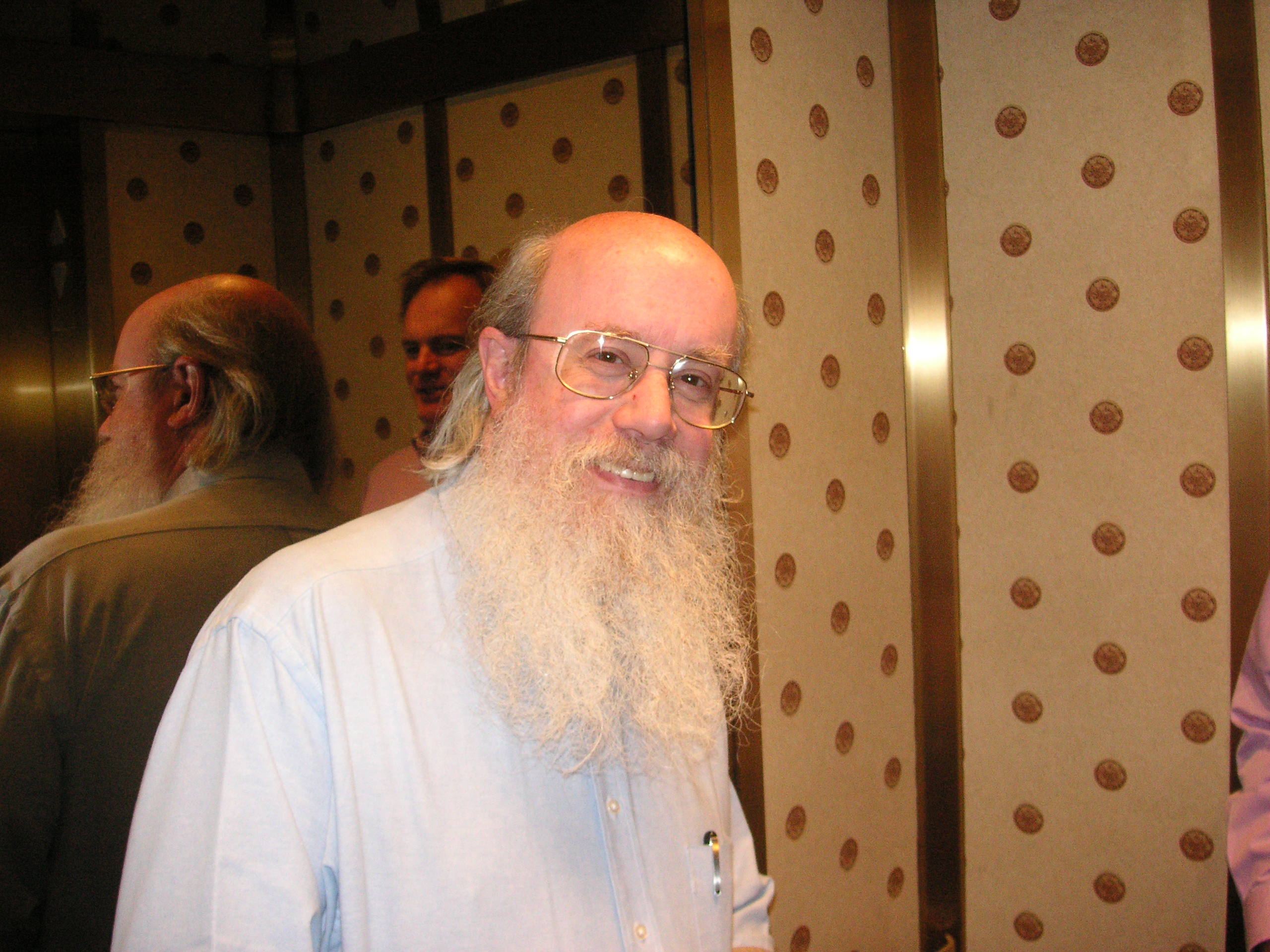

Scott Bradner is a senior figure in the area of Internet governance. He served as the secretary to the Internet Society from 2003–2016 and was formerly a trustee. He was on the board of ARIN, the North American IP address registry. He has also held numerous senior leadership roles on the Internet Engineering Task Force (IETF) which develops Internet standards. Until his retirement in July 2016, he was also University Technology Security Officer at Harvard University.

In the mid-1990s Bradner established himself an authority on developing an institution to succeed the Internet Assigned Numbers Authority (IANA). IANA managed the Internet's domain name system, but was essentially run by Jon Postel. As one of a number of close advisers to Postel, Bradner sought to maintain "Internet self-governance"—the idea that the users of the network should decide the rules by which they would abide.

In 1996 at a conference of the Harvard Information Infrastructure Project, Bradner described two conundrums of the Internet: "Who says who makes the rules?" and "Who says who pays for what?"
