= Internet Assigned Numbers Authority =

Standards organization overseeing IP addresses

- Abbreviation: IANA
- Founded: December 1988; 37 years ago
- Founder: U.S. Department of Commerce
- Purpose: Manage DNS zones
- Headquarters: 12025 Waterfront Drive, Suite 300, Los Angeles, CA 90094-2536, USA
- Location(s): Playa Vista, Los Angeles, United States
- Owner: ICANN
- Manager: Kim Davies
- Website: www.iana.org

The Internet Assigned Numbers Authority (IANA) is a standards organization that oversees global IP address allocation, autonomous system number allocation, root zone management in the Domain Name System (DNS), media types, and other Internet Protocol–related symbols and Internet numbers.

Currently it is a function of Public Technical Identifiers (PTI), an affiliate of the ICANN, a nonprofit private American corporation established in 1998 primarily for this purpose under a United States Department of Commerce contract. ICANN managed IANA directly from 1998 through 2016, when it was transferred to PTI. Before it, IANA was administered principally by Jon Postel at the Information Sciences Institute (ISI) of the University of Southern California (USC) situated at Marina Del Rey (Los Angeles), under a contract USC/ISI had with the United States Department of Defense.

In addition, five regional Internet registries delegate number resources to their customers, local Internet registries, Internet service providers, and end-user organizations. A local Internet registry is an organization that assigns parts of its allocation from a regional Internet registry to other customers. Most local Internet registries are also Internet service providers.

== Responsibilities ==
IANA is broadly responsible for the allocation of globally unique names and numbers that are used in Internet protocols that are published as Request for Comments (RFC) documents. These documents describe methods, behaviors, research, or innovations applicable to the working of the Internet and Internet-connected systems. IANA maintains a close liaison with the Internet Engineering Task Force (IETF) and RFC Editorial team in fulfilling this function.

In the case of the two major Internet namespaces, namely IP addresses and domain names, extra administrative policy and delegation to subordinate administrations is required because of the multi-layered distributed use of these resources.

IANA is responsible for assignment of Internet numbers, which are numerical identifiers assigned to an Internet resource or used in the networking protocols of the Internet Protocol Suite. Examples include IP addresses and autonomous system (AS) numbers.

=== IP addresses ===
IPv6 Prefix Assignment mechanism with IANA, RIRs, and ISPs

IANA delegates allocations of IP address blocks to regional Internet registries (RIRs). Each RIR allocates addresses for a different area of the world. Collectively the RIRs have created the Number Resource Organization formed as a body to represent their collective interests and ensure that policy statements are coordinated globally.

The RIRs divide their allocated address pools into smaller blocks and delegate them to Internet service providers and other organizations in their operating regions. Since the introduction of the CIDR system, IANA has typically allocated address space in the size of /8 prefix blocks for IPv4 and /23 to/12 prefix blocks from the 2000::/3 IPv6 block to requesting regional registries as needed. Since the exhaustion of the Internet Protocol Version 4 address space, no further IPv4 address space is allocated by IANA.

=== Domain names ===
IANA administers the data in the root nameservers, which form the top of the hierarchical Domain Name System (DNS) tree. This task involves liaising with top-level domain "Registrar-of-Record"s, the root nameserver operators, and ICANN's policy making apparatus.

Since the root zone was cryptographically signed in 2010, IANA is also responsible for vital parts of the key management for the DNSSEC operations (specifically, it is the "Root Zone KSK Operator"). Among other things, this involves regularly holding signing ceremonies where members of a group of Trusted Community Representatives (TCR) physically meet at a predefined location and go through scripted procedures to generate key material and signing keys. The TCRs cannot be affiliated with ICANN, PTI (an ICANN affiliate) or Verisign because of these organizations' operational roles in the key management, but are chosen from the broader DNS community. Past and present TCRs include Vinton Cerf, Dan Kaminsky, Dmitry Burkov, Anne-Marie Eklund Löwinder and John Curran.

IANA operates the int registry for international treaty organizations, the arpa zone for Internet infrastructure purposes, including reverse DNS service, and other critical zones such as root-servers.

=== Protocol assignments ===
IANA maintains protocol registries in tables of protocols and their parameters and coordinates registration of protocols. As of 2015 there were over 2,800 registries and subregistries.

=== Time zone database ===
The IANA time zone database holds the time zone differences and rules for the various regions of the world and allows this information to be mirrored and used by computers and other electronic devices to maintain proper configuration for timekeeping.

IANA assumed responsibility for the database on October 16, 2011, after the Astrolabe, Inc. v. Olson et al. decision caused the shutdown of the FTP server which had previously been the primary source of the database.

=== Language subtag registry ===
The IANA Language Subtag Registry was defined by IETF RFC5646 and maintained by IANA.

== History ==
IANA was established informally as a reference to various technical functions for the ARPANET, that Jon Postel and Joyce K. Reynolds performed at the University of California at Los Angeles (UCLA) and at the University of Southern California's Information Sciences Institute. On March 26, 1972, Vint Cerf and Jon Postel at UCLA called for establishing a socket number catalog in RFC 322. Network administrators were asked to submit a note or place a phone call, "describing the function and socket numbers of network service programs at each HOST". This catalog was subsequently published as RFC 433 in December 1972. In it Postel first proposed a registry of assignments of port numbers to network services, calling himself the czar of socket numbers.

The first reference to the name "IANA" in the RFC series is in RFC 1083, published in December 1988 by Postel at USC-ISI, referring to Joyce K. Reynolds as the IANA contact. However, the function, and the term, was well established long before that; RFC 1174 says that "Throughout its entire history, the Internet system has employed a central Internet Assigned Numbers Authority (IANA)..."

In 1995, the National Science Foundation authorized Network Solutions to assess domain name registrants a $50 fee per year for the first two years, 30 percent of which was to be deposited in the Intellectual Infrastructure Fund (IIF), a fund to be used for the preservation and enhancement of the intellectual infrastructure of the Internet. There was widespread dissatisfaction with this concentration of power (and money) in one company, and people looked to IANA for a solution. Postel wrote up a draft on IANA and the creation of new top-level domains. He was trying to institutionalize IANA. In retrospect, this would have been valuable, since he unexpectedly died about two years later.

In January 1998, Postel was threatened by US Presidential science advisor Ira Magaziner with the statement "You'll never work on the Internet again" after Postel collaborated with root server operators to test using a root server other than Network Solutions' "A" root to act as the authority over the root zone. Demonstrating that control of the root was from the IANA rather than from Network Solutions would have clarified IANA's authority to create new top-level domains as a step to resolving the DNS Wars, but he ended his effort after Magaziner's threat, and died not long after.

Jon Postel managed the IANA function from its inception on the ARPANET until his death in October 1998. By his almost 30 years of "selfless service", Postel created his de facto authority to manage key parts of the Internet infrastructure. After his death, Joyce K. Reynolds, who had worked with him for many years, managed the transition of the IANA function to ICANN.

Starting in 1988, IANA was funded by the U.S. government under a contract between the Defense Advanced Research Projects Agency and the Information Sciences Institute. This contract expired in April 1997, but was extended to preserve IANA.

On December 24, 1998, USC entered into a transition agreement with the Internet Corporation for Assigned Names and Numbers ICANN, transferring the IANA project to ICANN, effective January 1, 1999, thus making IANA an operating unit of ICANN.

In June 1999, at its Oslo meeting, IETF signed an agreement with ICANN concerning the tasks that IANA would perform for the IETF; this is published as RFC 2860.

On February 8, 2000, the Department of Commerce entered into an agreement with ICANN for ICANN to perform the IANA functions.

On October 7, 2013 the Montevideo Statement on the Future of Internet Cooperation was released by the leaders of a number of organizations involved in coordinating the Internet's global technical infrastructure, loosely known as the "I*" (or "I-star") group. Among other things, the statement "expressed strong concern over the undermining of the trust and confidence of Internet users globally due to recent revelations of pervasive monitoring and surveillance" and "called for accelerating the globalization of ICANN and IANA functions, towards an environment in which all stakeholders, including all governments, participate on an equal footing". This desire to move away from a United States centric approach is seen as a reaction to the ongoing NSA surveillance scandal. The statement was signed by the heads of the Internet Corporation for Assigned Names and Numbers (ICANN), the Internet Engineering Task Force, the Internet Architecture Board, the World Wide Web Consortium, the Internet Society, and the five regional Internet address registries (African Network Information Center, American Registry for Internet Numbers, Asia-Pacific Network Information Centre, Latin America and Caribbean Internet Addresses Registry, and Réseaux IP Européens Network Coordination Centre).

In October 2013, Fadi Chehadé, current President and CEO of ICANN, met with Brazilian President Dilma Rousseff in Brasilia. Upon Chehadé's invitation, the two announced that Brazil would host an international summit on Internet governance in April 2014. The announcement came after the 2013 disclosures of mass surveillance by the U.S. government, and President Rousseff's speech at the opening session of the 2013 United Nations General Assembly, where she strongly criticized the American surveillance program as a "breach of international law". The "Global Multistakeholder Meeting on the Future of Internet Governance (NET mundial)" will include representatives of government, industry, civil society, and academia. At the IGF VIII meeting in Bali in October 2013 a commenter noted that Brazil intends the meeting to be a "summit" in the sense that it will be high level with decision-making authority. The organizers of the "NET mundial" meeting have decided that an online forum called "/1net", set up by the I* group, will be a major conduit of non-governmental input into the three committees preparing for the meeting in April.

In April 2014 the NetMundial Initiative, a plan for international governance of the Internet, was proposed at the Global Multistakeholder Meeting on the Future of Internet Governance (GMMFIG) conference (23–24 April 2014) and later developed into the NetMundial Initiative by ICANN CEO Fadi Chehade along with representatives of the World Economic Forum (WEF) and the Brazilian Internet Steering Committee (Comitê Gestor da Internet no Brasil), commonly referred to as "CGI.br".

The meeting produced a nonbinding statement in favor of consensus-based decision-making. It reflected a compromise and did not harshly condemn mass surveillance or include the words "net neutrality", despite initial support for that from Brazil. The final resolution says ICANN should be under international control by September 2015. A minority of governments, including Russia, China, Iran and India, were unhappy with the final resolution and wanted multi-lateral management for the Internet, rather than broader multi-stakeholder management.

A month later, the Panel On Global Internet Cooperation and Governance Mechanisms (convened by the Internet Corporation for Assigned Names and Numbers (ICANN) and the World Economic Forum (WEF) with assistance from The Annenberg Foundation), supported and included the NetMundial statement in its own report.

== Oversight ==
IANA was managed by the Internet Corporation for Assigned Names and Numbers (ICANN) under contract with the United States Department of Commerce (DOC) and pursuant to an agreement with the IETF from 1998 to 2016. The Department of Commerce also provided an ongoing oversight function, whereby it verified additions and changes made in the DNS root zone to ensure IANA complied with its policies. The Internet Architecture Board (IAB), on behalf of the IETF, could terminate the agreement under which ICANN performs IANA functions with six months' notice.

ICANN and the Department of Commerce made an agreement for the "joint development of the "mechanisms methods, and procedures necessary to effect the transition of Internet domain name and addressing system (DNS) to the private sector" via a "Joint Project Agreement" in 1998.

On January 28, 2003, the Department of Commerce, via the Acquisition and Grants Office of the National Oceanic and Atmospheric Administration, issued a notice of intent to extend the IANA contract for three years. In August 2006, the U.S. Department of Commerce extended the IANA contract with ICANN by an additional five years, subject to annual renewals.

Since ICANN is managing a worldwide resource, while the IANA function is contracted to ICANN by the US Department of Commerce, various proposals have been brought forward to decouple the IANA function from ICANN.

On October 1, 2009 the "Joint Project Agreement" between ICANN and U.S. Department of Commerce expired, replaced by an "Affirmation of Commitments". On March 14, 2014, the U.S. Department of Commerce announced its intent to transition key Internet domain name functions to a global multi-stakeholder community.

In August 2016 ICANN incorporated Public Technical Identifiers, a non-profit affiliate corporation in California, to take over the IANA functions once the current contract expired at the end of September. The Department of Commerce confirmed that its criteria for transitioning IANA Stewardship to the Internet multistakeholder community had been met, and that it intended to allow its contract with ICANN to expire on September 30, 2016, allowing the transition to take effect. On October the contract between the United States Department of Commerce and ICANN to perform the IANA functions was allowed to expire and the stewardship of IANA functions was officially transitioned to the private sector.

== Managers ==
- In 1972, Jon Postel and Joyce K. Reynolds
- In 1998, Joyce K. Reynolds
- In 2003, Doug Barton
- In 2005, David Conrad
- In 2010, Elise Gerich
- In 2018, Kim Davies

== See also ==
- American Registry for Internet Numbers
- Internet governance
- List of information technology initialisms
- List of TCP and UDP port numbers
- Montevideo Statement on the Future of Internet Cooperation
- National Internet registry
- NetMundial Initiative, a plan for international governance of the Internet first proposed at the Global Multistakeholder Meeting on the Future of Internet Governance (GMMFIG) conference, 23–24 April 2014).
- Private Enterprise Number
- Registration authority
