= Indian Registry for Internet Names and Numbers =

Indian Registry for Internet Names and Numbers (IRINN)
Agency overview
- Formed: 2012
- Jurisdiction: Republic of India
- Headquarters: Indian Registry for Internet Names and Numbers (IRINN) C/o National Internet Exchange of India Flat no. 6B, Uppals M6 Plaza, 6 Jasola District Centre, New Delhi-110025
- Agency executive: Mr Anil Jain (CEO)
- Website: Official website

The Indian Registry for Internet Names and Numbers (IRINN) is the National Internet Registry in India. IRINN is entrusted with the task of coordinating IP address allocation with other Internet resource management function at national level in the country. National Internet Registry for India (IRINN) was announced on 2 March 2012.

IRINN is a non-profit, affiliation-based organisation functioning under NIXI and performing research, education and enlightenment activities.

NIR is entrusted with the task of:

- Coordinating and allocating Internet Protocol addresses – IPV4 & IPV6
- Autonomous System (AS Numbers)
