= John Curran (businessman) =

American computer scientist

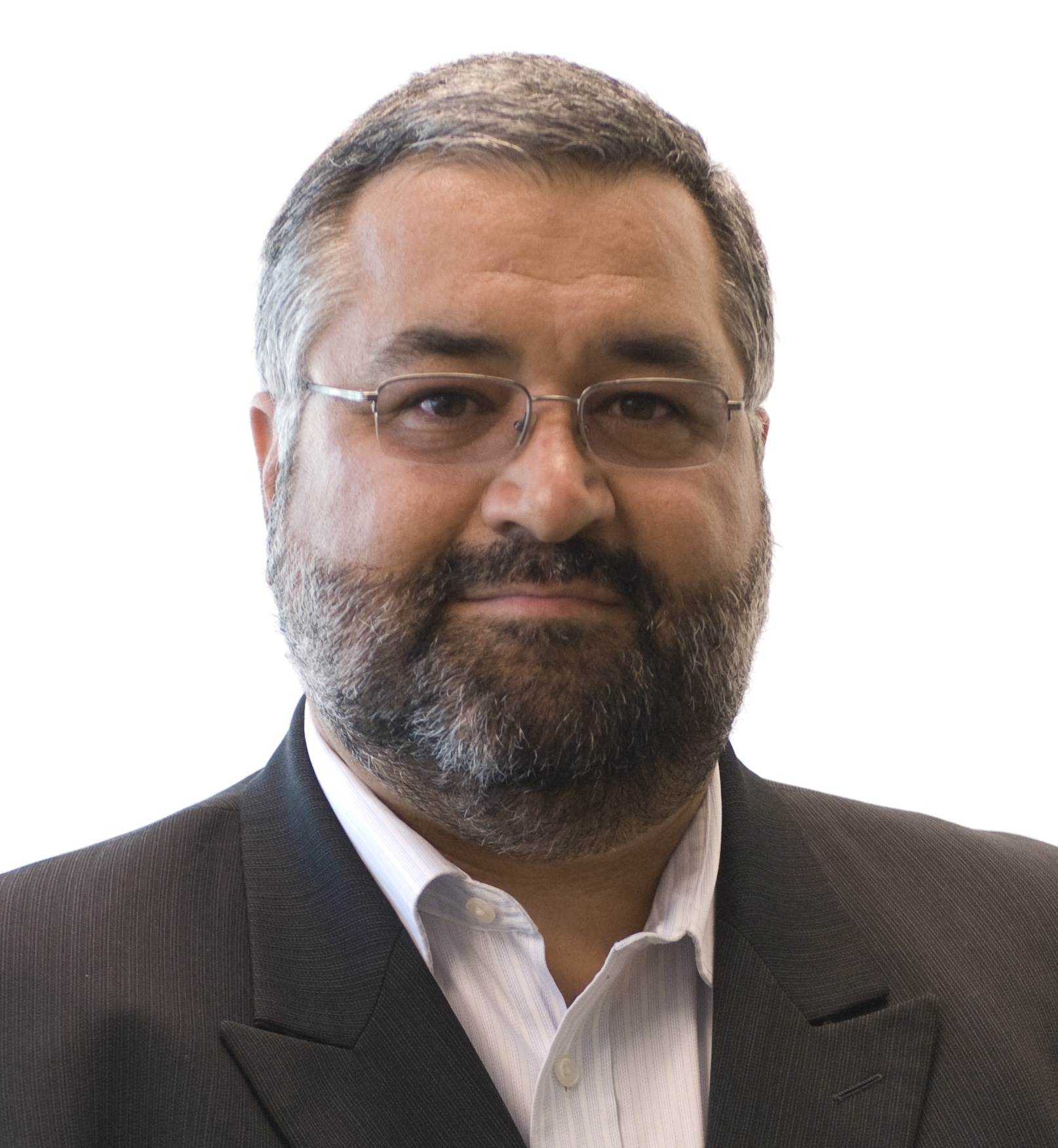
- Born: May 7, 1964 (age 61); Boston, Massachusetts, US
- Occupations: Chief Executive Officer, American Registry for Internet Numbers

John Curran (born May 7, 1964) is an early Internet executive, and since 2009, the current president and CEO of the American Registry for Internet Numbers (ARIN). He was a founder of ARIN and served as its chairman from inception through 2009. Curran ran several early Internet companies including BBN Planet, XO Communications, and Servervault.

== Career ==
Curran held positions as Chief Operating Officer & Chief Technical Officer of ServerVault (a federally oriented secure hosting company acquired by Carpathia Hosting), Chief Technical Officer of XO Communications, and Chief Technical Officer of BBN. Curran also worked for Combustion Engineering/Asea Brown Boveri and Control Data Corporation. Curran provided technical leadership to BBN's commercial Internet efforts, including working on the early Internet research networks (CSNET and NEARNET) and the NSFNET Network Service Center (NNSC) coordination center for the pre-commercial Internet.

John Curran has served as Area Director for Operations and Network Management Area of the Internet Engineering Task Force (IETF), as member of the IP Next Generation (IPng) area which led IPv6 development, and co-chaired the IETF Uniform Resource Name working group. He has authored RFCs in early network joint operations (RFC 1355) and IPv6 area, as well as supporting work in network endpoint architecture. Curran has experience with Federal IT system security practices (including FISMA security standards) and cloud computing, and has advocated for improving of Federal IT access to cloud computing services. Curran is author of RFC 5211, entitled "An Internet Transition Plan" which calls for moving the global Internet from its existing IPv4 protocol to the newer IPv6 protocol, as well as RFC 1669 entitled "Market Viability as a IPng Criteria", which summarizes some of the challenges IPv6 will have competing against IPv4 and the inevitable arrival of network address translation devices. In 2017, he was awarded the "IPv6 Lifetime Achievement Award" by the North American IPv6 Task Forces. Curran is notable among association leaders for being quite reachable publicly, including directly responding to queries on public email lists.

Curran has been active in Internet Governance initiatives throughout his career, including involvement in the Montevideo Statement on the Future of Internet Cooperation, the IANA Stewardship Transition, and defending the voice of the Technical Community in Internet Governance matters.
