= RIPE NCC =

Regional Internet Registry representing Europe, the former USSR and West Asia

Réseaux IP Européens Network Coordination Centre
- Founded: April 1992; 34 years ago
- Purpose: Allocation and registration of IP address space
- Location: Amsterdam, Netherlands
- Website: www.ripe.net

Map of service regions of the regional Internet registries (RIPE NCC is in yellow)

RIPE NCC (Réseaux IP Européens Network Coordination Centre) is the regional Internet registry (RIR) for Europe, the Middle East, and parts of Central Asia. Its headquarters are in Amsterdam, the Netherlands, with a branch office in Dubai, UAE.

A RIR oversees the allocation and registration of Internet number resources (IPv4 addresses, IPv6 addresses and autonomous system numbers) in a specific region.

The RIPE NCC supports the technical and administrative coordination of the infrastructure of the Internet. It is a not-for-profit membership organisation with almost 20,000 members at the end of 2024. It has members located in over 120 countries in its service region and beyond.

Any individual or organisation can become a member of the RIPE NCC. The membership consists mainly of Internet service providers (ISPs), telecommunication organisations, educational institutions, governments, regulatory agencies, and large corporations.

The RIPE NCC also provides technical and administrative support to Réseaux IP Européens (RIPE), a forum open to all parties with an interest in the technical development of the Internet.

== History ==
The RIPE NCC began its operations in April 1992 in Amsterdam, Netherlands. Initial funding was provided by the academic networks Réseaux Associés pour la Recherche Européenne (RARE) members, EARN, and EUnet. The RIPE NCC was formally established when the Dutch version of the Articles of Association was deposited with the Amsterdam Chamber of Commerce on 12 November 1997. The first RIPE NCC Activity Plan was published in May 1991.

On 25 November 2019, RIPE NCC announced that it had made its “final /22 IPv4 allocation from the last remaining addresses in our available pool. We have now run out of IPv4 addresses.” RIPE NCC will continue to allocate IPv4 addresses, but only “from organisations that have gone out of business or are closed, or from networks that return addresses they no longer need. These addresses will be allocated to our members (LIRs) according to their position on a new waiting list ….” The announcement also called for support for the implementation of the IPv6 roll-out.

== Activities ==
The RIPE NCC supports technical coordination of the Internet infrastructure in its service region and beyond. It undertakes many activities in this area, including:

- Allocation and registration of Internet number resources (IP addresses and autonomous system numbers)

The allocation of IP addresses is important for several reasons. Public addresses need to be unique; if duplicate internet addresses existed on a network, network traffic could be delivered to the wrong host. The RIRs make sure that public addresses are given to one organisation. The RIPE NCC does this for its own service region. Worldwide, IANA assigns blocks of addresses to the RIRs and they distribute these to end users via the LIRs (normally ISPs). Beside making sure that IP addresses and AS Numbers are only allocated to one user, the shortage of IPv4 addresses makes it important that the remaining addresses are allocated in an organised manner. For many years, the RIPE NCC has followed strict guidelines on how to assign IPv4 addresses according to policy developed by the RIPE Community, as outlined in the RIPE Document ripe-498. As the last /8 block has been assigned from IANA to all the RIRs, the RIPE NCC will only have new IPv4 addresses available for allocation for a certain amount of time.

- Development, operation and maintenance of the RIPE Database
- Development, operation and maintenance of the RIPE Routing Registry
- Operation of K-root, one of the world's root name servers
- Coordination support for ENUM delegations
- Collection and publication of neutral statistics on Internet development and performance, notably via the RIPE Atlas global measurement network and RIPEstat, a web-based interface providing information about IP address space, autonomous system numbers, and related information for hostnames and countries.

=== The RIPE Database ===
The RIPE Database is a public database containing registration details of the IP addresses and AS numbers originally allocated to members by the RIPE NCC. It shows which organisations or individuals currently hold which Internet number resources, when the allocations were made and contact details. The organisations or individuals that hold these resources are responsible for updating information in the database.

As of March 2008, the database contents are available for near real-time mirroring (NRTM).

=== RIPE Routing Registry ===
The RIPE Routing Registry (RR) is a sub-set of the RIPE Database and holds routing information in RPSL. The RIPE RR is a part of the Internet Routing Registry, a collection of databases that mirror each other. Information about domain names in the RIPE Database is for reference only. It is not the domain name registry that is run by the country code Top Level Domain (ccTLD) administrators of Europe and surrounding areas.

== The RIPE NCC and RIPE ==
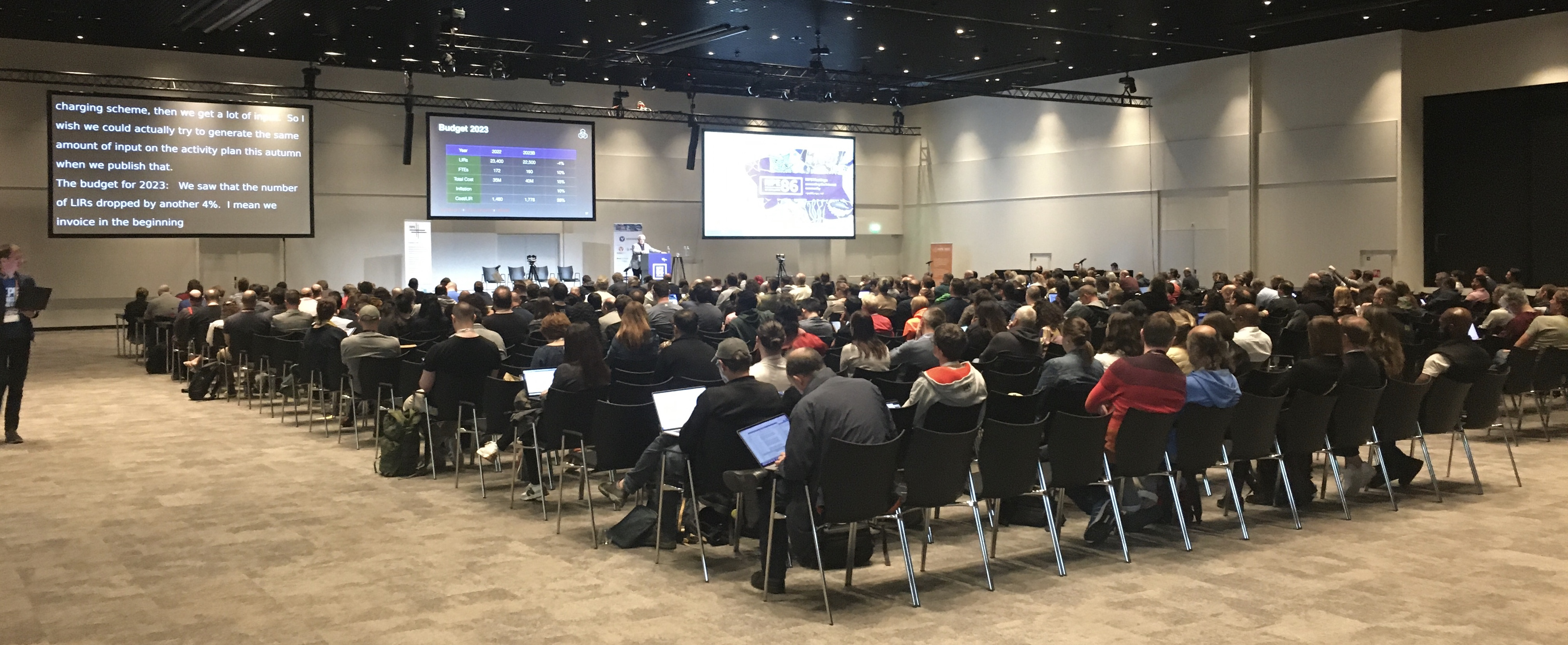
RIPE#86 in Rotterdam, in May 2023

Réseaux IP Européens is a forum open to all parties with an interest in the technical development of the Internet. Although similar in name, RIPE and the RIPE NCC are separate entities. However, they are highly interdependent. The RIPE NCC provides administrative support to RIPE, such as the facilitation of RIPE Meetings and giving administrative support to RIPE Working Groups.

== Fees and IPv4 Transfer Market ==
The RIPE NCC charges members an annual membership fee. Since 2012 this fee has been equal for all members and is unrelated to resource holdings. A separate charge is made for each Provider Independent number resource associated with customers of members.

There is also an active market in IPv4 address transfers and these relate to registration in the RIRs' databases rather than the addresses themselves. The RIPE NCC has a formal transfer process. Members must pay their annual fees before they can transfer resources away.

== Service regions ==
The RIPE NCC service region consists of countries in Europe, the Middle East and parts of Central Asia. RIPE NCC services are available to users outside this region through Local Internet Registries; these entities must have a valid legal address inside the service region but can offer their services to anyone.

Asia

Southwest Asia

- Bahrain
- Iran
- Iraq
- Israel
- Jordan
- Lebanon
- Oman
- Palestine
- Qatar
- Saudi Arabia
- Syria
- United Arab Emirates
- Yemen

Central Asia

- Kazakhstan
- Kyrgyzstan
- Tajikistan
- Turkmenistan
- Uzbekistan

Europe

- Albania
- Åland
- Andorra
- Armenia
- Austria
- Azerbaijan
- Belarus
- Belgium
- Bosnia-Herzegovina
- Bulgaria
- Croatia
- Cyprus
- Czech Republic
- Denmark
- Estonia
- Faroe Islands
- Finland
- France
- Georgia
- Germany
- Gibraltar (United Kingdom)
- Greece
- Hungary
- Iceland
- Ireland
- Isle of Man
- Italy
- Latvia
- Liechtenstein
- Lithuania
- Luxembourg
- Malta
- Moldova
- Monaco
- Montenegro
- Netherlands
- North Macedonia
- Norway
- Poland
- Portugal
- Romania
- Russia
- San Marino
- Serbia
- Slovakia
- Slovenia
- Spain
- Svalbard and Jan Mayen Islands
- Sweden
- Switzerland
- Turkey
- Ukraine
- United Kingdom
- Vatican City

North America

- Greenland (Denmark)

=== Former service regions ===
Prior to the formation of AFRINIC, the RIPE NCC served the following countries:

- Algeria
- Benin
- Burkina Faso
- Cape Verde
- Cameroon
- Central African Republic
- Chad
- Côte d'Ivoire
- Djibouti
- Egypt
- Equatorial Guinea
- Eritrea
- Ethiopia
- Gabon
- Gambia
- Ghana
- Guinea
- Guinea-Bissau
- Kenya
- Liberia
- Libya
- Mali
- Mauritania
- Morocco
- Niger
- Nigeria
- São Tomé and Príncipe
- Senegal
- Sierra Leone
- Somalia
- Sudan
- Togo
- Tunisia
- Uganda
- Western Sahara

== Related organisations and events ==
- Internet Corporation for Assigned Names and Numbers (ICANN)

ICANN assigns blocks of Internet resources (IP Resources and AS Numbers) to the RIPE NCC and the other RIRs.

- Number Resource Organization (NRO)

The NRO is made up of the five RIRs: AfriNIC, APNIC, ARIN, LACNIC and the RIPE NCC. It carries out the joint activities of the RIRs including joint technical projects, liaison activities and policy coordination.

- Address Supporting Organization (ASO)

The NRO also performs the function of the ASO, one of the supporting organisations called for by the ICANN bylaws. The ASO reviews and develops recommendations on Internet Policy relating to the system of IP addressing and advises the ICANN Board on these matters.

- World Summit on the Information Society (WSIS)

As part of the NRO, the RIPE NCC was actively involved in the WSIS.

- Internet Governance Forum (IGF)

As part of the NRO, the RIPE NCC is actively involved in the IGF.
