= National Internet registry =

A national Internet registry (or NIR) is an organization under the umbrella of a regional Internet registry (RIR) with the task of coordinating IP address allocations and other Internet resource management functions at a national level within a country or economic unit. NIRs were created in the early days of allocating IP addresses, with the last NIR created in India in 2013.

== Asia Pacific ==
When APNIC, the regional Internet registry for the Asia Pacific region, was created in 1993, there were some NIRs already existing and some were in formation. In 1996, NIRs were formally brought into the APNIC membership structure and new NIRs were allowed to be created. Two of the existing NIRs, AUNIC and NZNIC, decided not to continue and transferred their resources to APNIC for management.

After a pause in accepting applications, on 1 December 2002 APNIC published new criteria for the establishment of NIRs. On 12 February 2012, the APNIC Executive Council (EC) voted to impose a moratorium on accepting new applications for NIRs.

In February 2024, the APNIC EC voted to make this moratorium permanent and not allow the creation of any new NIRs. Existing NIRs were allowed to continue operating.

The following NIRs are currently operating in the APNIC region:

- APJII, Indonesia Network Information Centre - Asosiasi Penyelenggara Jasa Internet Indonesia
- CNNIC, China Internet Network Information Center
- IRINN, Indian Registry for Internet Names and Numbers
- JPNIC, Japan Network Information Center
- KISA, Korea Internet & Security Agency
- TWNIC, Taiwan Network Information Center
- VNNIC, Vietnam Internet Network Information Center

== Latin America ==
Two NIRs were created prior to the launch of LACNIC in 1999 and both organizations assisted in the creation of LACNIC.

- NIC Mexico
- NIC.br

No new NIRs were created by LACNIC.

== Other Regions ==
APNIC was the only RIR to operate an active NIR structure.

== See also ==
- Regional Internet registry
- Internet Assigned Numbers Authority
- Internet governance
