= APNIC =

Regional Internet registry for the Asia Pacific region

Coordinates: 27.47315°S 153.0141°E

Asia Pacific Network Information Centre
- Founded: 15 January 1993; 33 years ago
- Purpose: Allocation and registration of IP address space
- Location: Brisbane, Queensland, Australia
- Members: 7,828
- Chair of Executive Council: Kenny Huang
- Secretary of Executive Council: Roopinder Singh Perhar
- Treasurer of Executive Council: Yoshinobu Matsuzaki
- Employees: 122
- Website: www.apnic.net

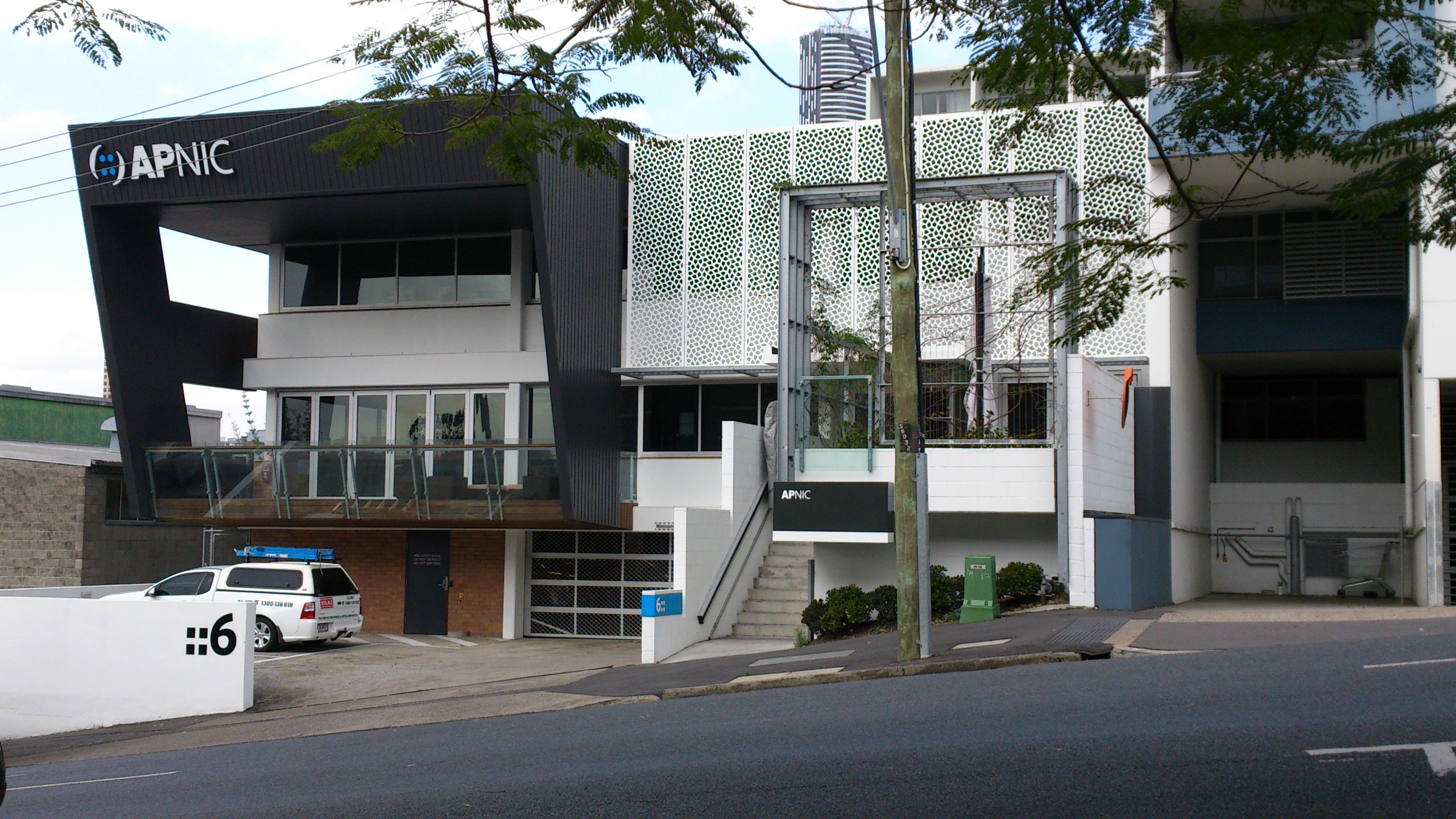
APNIC offices

The Asia Pacific Network Information Centre (APNIC) is the regional Internet address registry (RIR) for the Asia–Pacific region. It is one of the world's five RIRs and is part of the Number Resource Organization (NRO).

APNIC provides numbers resource allocation and registration services that support the global operation of the internet. It is a nonprofit, membership-based organization whose members include Internet service providers, telecommunication providers, data centers, universities, banks, national Internet registries, and similar organizations that have their own networks.

== Functions ==
APNIC's main functions are:

- Allocating IPv4 and IPv6 address space, and autonomous system numbers
- Maintaining the public APNIC Whois Database for the Asia Pacific region,
- Reverse DNS delegations
- Training in technical skills
- Representing the interests of the Asia Pacific Internet community on the global stage

APNIC manages Internet number resources according to policies developed through an open process of consultation and consensus called the Policy Development Process (PDP).

== APNIC PDP ==
APNIC's policies are developed by the membership and the broader Internet community. The forums for policy development are the face-to-face Open Policy Meetings, which are held twice each year, and the public mailing list discussions of the Special Internet Groups.

APNIC's open Policy Development Process (PDP) also invites stakeholders interested in Internet number resources from around the world (but mostly the Asia Pacific) to participate. These include representatives from governments, regulators, educators, media, the technical community, civil society, and other not-for-profit organizations.

APNIC's PDP is:

- Open
  - Anyone can propose policies.
  - Everyone can discuss policy proposals.
- Transparent
  - APNIC publicly documents all policy discussions and decisions.
- Bottom-up
  - The community drives policy development.

== Structure ==
Elections are held at each APNIC Annual General Meeting (AGM), which is conducted during the APNIC Member Meeting (AMM) in February. Voting takes place both on-site at these meetings and prior to the meeting via online voting.

=== APNIC Executive Council ===
Each APNIC Executive Council (EC) member serves as an individual, not as a representative of any other party or Member. Therefore, they must act at all times in the best interests of APNIC. The APNIC EC meets face-to-face at four regularly scheduled meetings per year.

=== APNIC Secretariat ===
The APNIC Secretariat operates to serve its Members and the Asia Pacific Internet community stakeholders.

Its activities are designed to help the APNIC community achieve APNIC's objectives. The Secretariat (APNIC's staff) carries out the day-to-day work. The Secretariat is structured in five divisions: Services, Technical, Business, Communications, and Learning & Development. These divisions encompass all APNIC activities, including that of acting as a central source of information for Members.

== Core services ==
=== Internet number resource delegation ===
APNIC delegates IP addresses (IPv4 and IPv6) and (ASNs) according to policies developed by the APNIC community. All IP and AS number delegation is subject to certain criteria, based on demonstrated need.

=== APNIC Whois Database ===
The APNIC Whois Database details of IP addresses and AS numbers originally allocated by APNIC. It shows the organizations that hold the resources, where the allocations were made, and contact details for the networks. Users can search the whois for information pertaining to these resources, for network troubleshooting, or helping to track network abuse. The organizations that hold those resources are responsible for updating their information in the database. Internet number resources must be properly and accurately registered to fulfil the goals of addressing policy as outlined by the Public Technical Identifiers (PTI), who are responsible for the operation of the Internet Assigned Numbers Authority (IANA) functions.

This accurate registration of resource usage is a critical role APNIC plays in the operation of the Internet.

The database can be searched by using the web interface on the APNIC site, or by directing your whois client to whois.apnic.net (for example, whois -h whois.apnic.net 203.37.255.97).

=== RDAP ===
APNIC provides an alternative to the whois called the Registration Data Access protocol (RDAP), which was designed to address issues in the whois service, the most important of which are: standardization of queries and responses; internalization considerations to cater for languages other than English in data objects; and redirection capabilities to allow seamless referrals to other registrations.

=== Network abuse ===
For network abuse such as spam or (hacking), people mistakenly interpret references to apnic.net when doing a whois search to indicate that APNIC is the source of the abuse. Instead, these references to APNIC simply mean that the address space in question was delegated by APNIC to an organization within the Asia Pacific region. APNIC has no authority to prevent these kinds of network abuse.

APNIC also has no technical ability to 'suspend' an Internet service, no mandate to withdraw address registrations, no investigative powers, nor any authority to take action as an enforcement agency. APNIC is in the same position as any other IP address or DNS registry worldwide.

=== Reverse DNS delegation ===
APNIC manages reverse DNS delegations for both IPv4 and IPv6. APNIC only delegates the authority of reverse zones to the DNS name servers provided through domain objects.

=== Resource Certification ===
APNIC provides a Resource Certification service, which is a security framework used to verify the association between specific IP address blocks of ASNs and the holders of those Internet number resources. APNIC introduced Resource Certification to improve inter-domain security in the region and enhance the value of the data in the APNIC Whois Database with verification of the resource holder's right-of-use.

Resource Public Key Infrastructure (RPKI) is the validation structure for Resource Certification that enables public network users to verify the authenticity of data that has been digitally signed by the data originator.

== Other services ==
=== APNIC training ===
APNIC conducts a number of training courses in a wide variety of locations around the region. These courses are designed to educate participants to proficiently configure, manage and administer their Internet services and infrastructure and to embrace current best practices.

=== Technical conferences ===
APNIC holds two conferences a year in various locations around the Asia Pacific region. The first one is held with the Asia Pacific Regional Internet Conference on Operational Technologies (APRICOT) and the second one is a stand-alone conference. Both events have a series of workshop sessions on topics such as routing, IPv6, and network security, and plenary and conference tracks on operational topics of current interest.

=== Conference schedule ===
Title	City	Date	Notes
APNIC 20	Hanoi, Vietnam	6–9 September 2005	
APNIC 21	Perth, Australia	27 February – 3 March 2006	Held in conjunction with APRICOT 2006
APNIC 22	Kaohsiung, Taiwan	4–8 September 2006	
APNIC 23	Bali, Indonesia	26 February – 2 March 2007	Held in conjunction with APRICOT 2007
APNIC 24	New Delhi, India	29 August – 7 September 2007	
APNIC 25	Taipei, Taiwan	25–29 February 2008	Held in conjunction with APRICOT 2008
APNIC 26	Christchurch, New Zealand	25–29 August 2008	
APNIC 27	Manila, Philippines	23–27 February 2009	Held in conjunction with APRICOT 2009
APNIC 28	Beijing, China	25–28 August 2009	
APNIC 29	Kuala Lumpur, Malaysia	24 February – 5 March 2010	Held in conjunction with APRICOT 2010
APNIC 30	Gold Coast, Australia	24–27 August 2010	Standalone Meeting
APNIC 31	Hong Kong SAR, China	21–25 February 2011	Held in conjunction with APRICOT and APAN 2011
APNIC 32	Busan, South Korea	28 August – 1 September 2011	Standalone Meeting
APNIC 33	New Delhi, India	27 February – 2 March 2012	Held in conjunction with APRICOT 2012
APNIC 34	NagaWorld, Phnom Penh, Cambodia	21–31 August 2012	Standalone Meeting
APNIC 35	Singapore	25 February – 1 March 2013	Held in conjunction with APRICOT 2013
APNIC 36	Xi'an City, Shaanxi Province, China	20–30 August 2013	Standalone Meeting
APNIC 37	Petaling Jaya, Malaysia	18–28 February 2014	Held in conjunction with APRICOT 2014
APNIC 38	Brisbane, Australia	9–19 September 2014	Standalone Meeting
APNIC 39	Fukuoka, Japan	24 February – 6 March 2015	Held in conjunction with APRICOT 2015
APNIC 40	Jakarta, Indonesia	3–10 September 2015	Standalone Meeting
APNIC 41	Auckland, New Zealand	15–26 February 2016	Held in conjunction with APRICOT 2016
APNIC 42	Colombo, Sri Lanka	28 September – 5 October 2016	Standalone Meeting
APNIC 43	Ho Chi Minh City, Vietnam	20 February – 2 March 2017	Held in conjunction with APRICOT 2017
APNIC 44	Taichung, Taiwan	7–14 September 2017	Standalone Meeting
APNIC 45	Kathmandu, Nepal	19–28 February 2018	Held in conjunction with APRICOT 2018
APNIC 46	Nouméa, New Caledonia	6–13 September 2018	Standalone Meeting
APNIC 47	Daejeon, South Korea	18–28 February 2019	Held in conjunction with APRICOT 2019
APNIC 48	Chiang Mai, Thailand	5–12 September 2019	Standalone Meeting
APNIC 49	Melbourne, Australia	12–21 February 2020	Held in conjunction with APRICOT 2020
APNIC 50	Online	8–10 September 2020	Standalone Meeting
APNIC 51	Online	22 February – 4 March 2021	Held in conjunction with APRICOT 2021
APNIC 52	Online	13–16 September 2021	Standalone Meeting
APNIC 53	Online	21 February – 3 March 2022	Held in conjunction with APRICOT 2022
APNIC 54	Singapore	8–15 September 2022	
APNIC 55	Manila, Philippines	20 February – 2 March 2023	Held in conjunction with APRICOT 2023
APNIC 56	Kyoto, Japan	7–14 September 2023	
APNIC 57	Bangkok, Thailand	21 February – 1 March 2024	Held in conjunction with APRICOT 2024
APNIC 58	Wellington, New Zealand	30 August – 6 September 2024	
APNIC 59	Petaling Jaya, Malaysia	19 – 27 February 2025	Held in conjunction with APRICOT 2025
APNIC 60	Da Nang, Viet Nam	4 – 11 September 2025	

=== Research ===
APNIC Labs provide research, measurement, and technical reports on the use of Internet number resources within the Internet, for example, IPv6 deployment.

== APNIC Foundation ==
The APNIC Foundation is a charity established to raise funds independently from APNIC Member contributions to support and expand Internet development efforts in the Asia Pacific.

== Partners ==
APNIC works closely with many other Internet organizations, including:

=== The APNIC membership ===
Major Internet Service Providers (ISPs), National Internet Registries (NIRs) and Network Information Centres (NICs).

=== Other Regional Internet Registries (RIRs) ===
ARIN (North America), LACNIC (Latin America and the Caribbean), RIPE NCC (Europe), and AFRINIC (Africa).

=== The Number Resource Organization ===
With the other RIRs, APNIC is a member of the Number Resource Organization (NRO), which exists to protect the unallocated number resource pool, to promote and protect the bottom-up policy development process, and to be the focal point for input into the RIR system.

=== Other leading Internet organizations ===
These include the Internet Assigned Numbers Authority (IANA), the Internet Corporation for Assigned Names and Numbers (ICANN), the Internet Engineering Task Force (IETF), the Internet Engineering and Planning Group (IEPG), the Internet Society (ISOC), and others.

The previous registry for Australia, known as AUNIC, is now disbanded, and its responsibilities undertaken by APNIC.

== History ==
APNIC was established in 1992, by the Asia Pacific Coordinating Committee for Intercontinental Research Networks (APCCIRN) and the Asia Pacific Engineering and Planning Group (APEPG). These two groups were later amalgamated and renamed the Asia Pacific Networking Group (APNG). It was established as a pilot project to administer address space as defined by RFC-1366, as well as encompassing a wider brief: "To facilitate communication, business, and culture using Internet technologies".

In 1993, APNG discovered they were unable to provide a formal umbrella or legal structure for APNIC, and so the pilot project was concluded, but APNIC continued to exist independently under the authority of IANA as an 'interim project'. At this stage, APNIC still lacked legal rights, a membership, and a fee structure.

In February 1995, the inaugural APNIC meeting was held in Bangkok, marking the beginning of the formalisation of APNIC. This was a two-day meeting, run by volunteers, and was free to attend. Voluntary donations were sought according to the size of the organization, ranging from US$1,500 for 'small', through to US$10,000 for 'large'. Three member types were defined by APNIC-001: ISP (local IR), Enterprise, and National.

1996 saw a proper fee structure introduced, the establishment of a membership, and the holding of the first APRICOT meeting.

By the time 1997 rolled around, it was becoming increasingly clear that APNIC's local environment in Japan was restricting its growth – for example, the staff was limited to 4–5 members. Therefore, the consulting firm KPMG was contracted to find an ideal location in the Asia Pacific region for APNIC's new headquarters.

For reasons such as the stable infrastructure, the low cost of living and operation, and tax advantages for membership organizations, Brisbane, Australia was chosen as the new location, and relocation was completed between April and August 1998, while maintaining continuous operation throughout.

By 1999, the relocation was complete, the Asian economic crisis ended, and so began a period of consolidation for APNIC – a period of sustained growth, policy development, and the creation of documentation and internal systems.

Since then, APNIC has continued to grow from its humble beginnings to a membership of more than 7,700 in 56 economies throughout the region and a secretariat of around 122 staff members located in the head office in Brisbane, Australia.

== Economies ==
APNIC represents the Asia Pacific region, comprising 56 economies:

- Afghanistan
- American Samoa (US)
- Australia
- Bangladesh
- Bhutan
- British Indian Ocean Territory (UK)
- Brunei
- Cambodia
- China (PRC)
- Christmas Island (AU)
- Cocos (Keeling) Islands (AU)
- Cook Islands (NZ)
- East Timor
- Fiji
- French Polynesia (France)
- French Southern Territories (France)
- Guam (US)
- Hong Kong (PRC)
- India
- Indonesia
- Japan
- Kiribati
- Korea, North
- Korea, South
- Laos
- Macau (PRC)
- Malaysia
- Maldives
- Marshall Islands
- Micronesia
- Mongolia
- Myanmar (formerly Burma)
- Nauru
- Nepal
- New Caledonia (France)
- New Zealand
- Niue (NZ)
- Norfolk Island (AU)
- Northern Mariana Islands (US)
- Pakistan
- Palau
- Papua New Guinea
- Philippines
- Pitcairn (UK)
- Samoa
- Singapore
- Solomon Islands
- Sri Lanka
- Taiwan (ROC)
- Thailand
- Tokelau (NZ)
- Tonga
- Tuvalu
- Vanuatu
- Vietnam
- Wallis and Futuna Islands (France)

APNIC covered Madagascar, Mauritius and Seychelles until AFRINIC was formed.
