= Regional internet registry =

Organization that manages network numbering

Number Resource Organization
- Founded: 1992 (RIPE NCC); 1993 (APNIC); 1997 (ARIN); 1999 (LACNIC); 2003 (NRO); 2004 (AFRINIC)
- Type: Internet governance
- Purpose: Providing a coordinated Internet number registry system supporting the multi-stakeholder model
- Origins: 1992 RIPE NCC begins distributing addresses 2003 letter from RIRs to ICANN; 2004 Memorandum of Understanding
- Region served: Worldwide
- Method: Coordinating joint activities of regional internet registries
- Website: https://aso.icann.org/

A regional internet registry (RIR) is an organization that manages the allocation and registration of internet number resources within a region of the world. Internet number resources include IP addresses and autonomous system (AS) numbers.

Map of regional Internet registries

The regional internet registry system evolved, eventually dividing the responsibility for management to a registry for each of five regions of the world. The regional internet registries are informally liaised through the unincorporated Number Resource Organization (NRO), which is a coordinating body to act on matters of global importance.

== Regional internet registries ==
There are five regional internet registries:

- The African Network Information Centre (AFRINIC) is based in Ebene, Mauritius and serves all of Africa.
- The American Registry for Internet Numbers (ARIN) is based in Chantilly, Virginia, United States, and serves Antarctica, Canada, the United States, and some Caribbean countries and territories.
- The Asia Pacific Network Information Centre (APNIC) is based in Brisbane, Australia and serves East, South and Southeast Asia and Oceania.
- The Latin America and Caribbean Network Information Centre (LACNIC) is based in Montevideo, Uruguay and serves Latin America as well as some Caribbean countries.
- Réseaux IP Européens Network Coordination Centre (RIPE NCC) is based in Amsterdam, Netherlands and serves Central and West Asia, Europe, and Russia.

Regional Internet registries 2002–2005

Regional Internet registries until 2002

RIRs are components of the Internet Number Registry System, which is described in the Internet Engineering Task Force (IETF) RFC 7020. Under this framework, the Internet Assigned Numbers Authority (IANA) delegates internet resources to the RIRs. In turn, these registries follow their regional policies to delegate resources to their customers, which include internet service providers (ISPs) and end-user organizations.

Collectively, the RIRs participate in the Number Resource Organization (NRO), a body formed to represent their joint interests and coordinate activities globally. The NRO has entered into an agreement with the Internet Corporation for Assigned Names and Numbers (ICANN) for the establishment of the Address Supporting Organisation (ASO), which coordinates global IP addressing policies within the ICANN framework.

== Number Resource Organization ==
The Number Resource Organization (NRO) is an unincorporated organization uniting the five RIRs. It came into existence on October 24, 2003, when the four existing RIRs entered into a memorandum of understanding (MoU) in order to undertake joint activities, including joint technical projects and policy coordination. The youngest RIR, AFRINIC, joined in April 2005.

The NRO's main objectives are to:

- Protect the unallocated IP address resource pool.
- Promote and protect the bottom-up policy development process of the internet.
- Serve as a focal point for the internet community to provide input on the RIR system.

=== Address Supporting Organization ===
The NRO is formally affiliated with ICANN in its role as ICANN's Address Supporting Organization (ASO). According to the ASO website, its purpose is "to review and develop recommendations on Internet Protocol (IP) address policy and to advise the ICANN Board on policy issues relating to the operation, assignment, and management of IP addresses." The ASO is made up of representatives from each of the five regional internet registries. It nominates two members of the ICANN board of directors. Its members make up the Address Council.

== Local internet registry ==
A local internet registry (LIR) is an organization that has been allocated a block of IP addresses by an RIR, and that assigns most parts of this block to its own customers. Most LIRs are internet service providers, enterprises, or academic institutions. Membership in a regional internet registry is required to become a LIR.

== See also ==
- Country code top-level domain
- Internet geolocation
- Internet governance
- National internet registry
