= American Registry for Internet Numbers =

Regional Internet Registry representing North America and the Caribbean

American Registry for Internet Numbers Ltd.
- ARIN logo
- Founded: April 18, 1997; 29 years ago
- Type: Nonprofit corporation
- Legal status: Active
- Purpose: Allocation and registration of IP address space
- Location(s): Chantilly, Virginia, United States; 38°54′37.9″N 77°26′35.7″W
- Region served: List: Anguilla; Antarctica; Antigua and Barbuda; Bahamas; Barbados; Bermuda; Bouvet Island; British Virgin Islands; Canada; Cayman Islands; Dominica; Grenada; Guadeloupe; Heard and McDonald Islands; Jamaica; Martinique; Puerto Rico; Saint Kitts and Nevis; Saint Lucia; Saint Vincent and the Grenadines; Saint Helena; Saint Pierre and Miquelon; United States; United States Virgin Islands
- Key people: John Curran (President and CEO); Richard Jimmerson (COO)
- Parent organization: Number Resource Organization
- Website: www.arin.net

The American Registry for Internet Numbers (ARIN) is the regional Internet registry for the United States, Canada, and many Caribbean and North Atlantic countries. ARIN manages the distribution of Internet number resources, including IPv4 and IPv6 address space and AS numbers. ARIN opened for business on December 22, 1997 after incorporating on April 18, 1997. ARIN is a nonprofit corporation with headquarters in Chantilly, Virginia, United States.

ARIN is one of five regional Internet registries in the world. Like the other regional Internet registries, ARIN:

- Provides services related to the technical coordination and management of Internet number resources
- Facilitates policy development by its members and stakeholders
- Participates in the international Internet community
- Is a nonprofit, community-based organization
- Is governed by an executive board elected by its membership

== Services ==
ARIN provides services related to the technical coordination and management of Internet number resources. The nature of these services is described in ARIN's mission statement:

ARIN supports the operation of the Internet through the management of Internet number resources throughout its service region; coordinates the development of policies by the community for the management of Internet Protocol number resources; and advances the Internet through informational outreach. ARIN will continue to utilize an open, transparent multi-stakeholder process for registry policy development.

These services are grouped in three areas: Registration, Organization, and Policy Development.

=== Registration services ===
Registration services pertain to the technical coordination and inventory management of Internet number resources. Services include:

- IPv4 address allocation and assignment
- IPv6 address allocation and assignment
- AS number assignment
- Directory services including:
  - Registration transaction information (WHOIS)
  - Routing information and security (Resource Public Key Infrastructure, Internet routing registry)
- DNS (Reverse)

For information on requesting Internet number resources from ARIN, see https://www.arin.net/resources/guide/request/. This section includes what is necessary to request resources, specific distribution policies, and guidelines for requesting and managing Internet number resources.

=== Organization services ===
Organization services pertain to interaction between stakeholders, ARIN members, and ARIN. Services include:

- ARIN Elections for its Board of Trustees, Advisory Council, and Number Resource Organization Number Council.
- Public Policy and Members meetings (biannual)
- Participation at ARIN-hosted outreach events as well as regional and global Internet community events
- Information publication and dissemination
- Education and training

=== Policy development services ===
Policy development services facilitate the development of policy for the technical coordination and management of Internet number resources.

Internet number resource policy must satisfy three principles:

1. Enable fair and impartial Internet number resource administration
2. Be technically sound
3. Be supported by the Internet community

All ARIN policies are set by the community. Everyone is encouraged to participate in the Policy Development Process at ARIN's Public Policy and Members Meetings and on the Public Policy Mailing List — membership is not a requirement to participate. The ARIN Board of Trustees ensures the Policy Development Process has been followed and reviews the history of each policy for compliance before adopting it.

Services include:

- Maintaining discussion e-mail lists
- Conducting biannual Public Policy and Members Meetings
- Publishing policy documents

== Organizational structure ==
ARIN consists of the Internet community within its region, its members, a 10-member Board of Trustees, a 15-member Advisory Council, and a professional staff of about 100. The Board of Trustees and Advisory Council are elected by ARIN members for three-year terms.

=== Board of Trustees ===
ARIN General Members elect the Board of Trustees, which maintains authority of the scope, mission, strategic direction and fiscal oversight of ARIN. The Board consists of 10 members, including ARIN's President and CEO, a Chair, and a Treasurer. The Board is responsible for determining the disposition of all revenues received to ensure all services are provided in an equitable manner. Executive decisions are carried out following approval by the Board.

=== Advisory Council ===
ARIN's Advisory Council serves in an advisory capacity to the Board of Trustees on Internet number resource policy and related matters. Adhering to the procedures in the Policy Development Process, the Advisory Council forwards consensus-based policy proposals to the Board for ratification. The Advisory Council consists of 15 elected members, including a Chair and Vice Chair.

== History ==
Old ARIN logo used up until 2026

The organization was formed in December 1997 to "provide IP registration services as an independent, nonprofit corporation." Until this time, IP address registration (outside of RIPE and APNIC regions) was done in accordance with policies set by the IETF by Network Solutions corporation as part of the InterNIC project. The National Science Foundation approved the plan for the creation of the not-for-profit organization to "give the users of IP numbers (mostly Internet service providers, corporations and other large institutions) a voice in the policies by which they are managed and allocated within the North American region.". As part of the transition, Network Solutions corporation transitioned these tasks as well as initial staff and computer infrastructure to ARIN.

The initial Board of Trustees consisted of Scott Bradner, John Curran, Kim Hubbard, Don Telage, Randy Bush, Raymundo Vega Aguilar, and Jon Postel (IANA) as an ex-officio member.

The first president of ARIN was Kim Hubbard, from 1997 until 2000. Kim was succeeded by Raymond "Ray" Plzak until the end of 2008. Trustee John Curran was acting president until July 1, 2009, when he assumed the CEO role permanently.

Until late 2002, ARIN served Mexico, Central America, South America and all of the Caribbean. LACNIC now handles parts of the Caribbean, Mexico, Central America, and South America. Sub-Saharan Africa was also part of ARIN's region until April 2005, when AfriNIC was officially recognized by ICANN as the fifth regional Internet registry.

On September 24, 2015, ARIN declared exhaustion of its ARIN IPv4 address pool.

In 2022, ARIN changed its membership structure to allow end user customers to be considered Service Members. In 2024, ARIN updated its membership structure to include ASN-only customers as Service Members. Any Service Member is eligible to participate in ARIN Elections by requesting General Membership. As a result, all organizations with Internet number resources under an ARIN agreement can participate in ARIN's governance.

== Service region ==
The countries in the ARIN service region are:

- Anguilla (United Kingdom)
- Antarctica
- Antigua and Barbuda
- Barbados
- Bermuda (United Kingdom)
- Bouvet Island (Norway)
- British Virgin Islands (United Kingdom)
- Canada
- Cayman Islands (United Kingdom)
- Collectivity of Saint Martin (France)
- Dominica
- Grenada
- Guadeloupe (France)
- Heard Island and McDonald Islands (Australia)
- Jamaica
- Martinique (France)
- Montserrat (United Kingdom)
- Puerto Rico (United States)
- Saint Barthélemy (France)
- Saint Helena, Ascension and Tristan da Cunha (United Kingdom)
- Saint Kitts and Nevis
- Saint Lucia
- Saint Pierre and Miquelon (France)
- Saint Vincent and the Grenadines
- The Bahamas
- Turks and Caicos Islands (United Kingdom)
- United States
- United States Minor Outlying Islands (United States)
- United States Virgin Islands (United States)

=== Former service regions ===
ARIN formerly covered Angola, Botswana, Burundi, Republic of Congo, Democratic Republic of Congo, Eswatini, Lesotho, Malawi, Mozambique, Namibia, Rwanda, South Africa, Tanzania, Zambia, and Zimbabwe until AfriNIC was formed.

ARIN formerly covered Argentina, Aruba, Belize, Bolivia, Brazil, Chile, Colombia, Costa Rica, Cuba, Dominican Republic, Dutch West Indies, Ecuador, El Salvador, Falkland Islands (UK), French Guiana, Guatemala, Guyana, Haiti, Honduras, Mexico, Nicaragua, Panama, Paraguay, Peru, South Georgia and the South Sandwich Islands, Suriname, Trinidad and Tobago, Uruguay, and Venezuela until LACNIC was formed.
