= LACNIC =

Regional Internet registry for Latin American and Caribbean regions

Latin American and Caribbean Internet Addresses Registry
- Founded: 22 August 1999; 27 years ago
- Type: Nonprofit corporation
- Legal status: Active
- Purpose: Allocation and registration of IP address space
- Location: Montevideo, Uruguay
- Region served: List: Argentina; Aruba; Belize; Bolivia; Brazil; Chile; Colombia; Costa Rica; Cuba; Curaçao; Dominican Republic; Ecuador; El Salvador; Falkland Islands; French Guiana; Guatemala; Guyana; Haiti; Honduras; Mexico; Nicaragua; Panama; Paraguay; Peru; Saint Martin; Sint Maarten; South Georgia and the South Sandwich Islands; Suriname; Trinidad and Tobago; Uruguay; Venezuela
- Website: www.lacnic.net

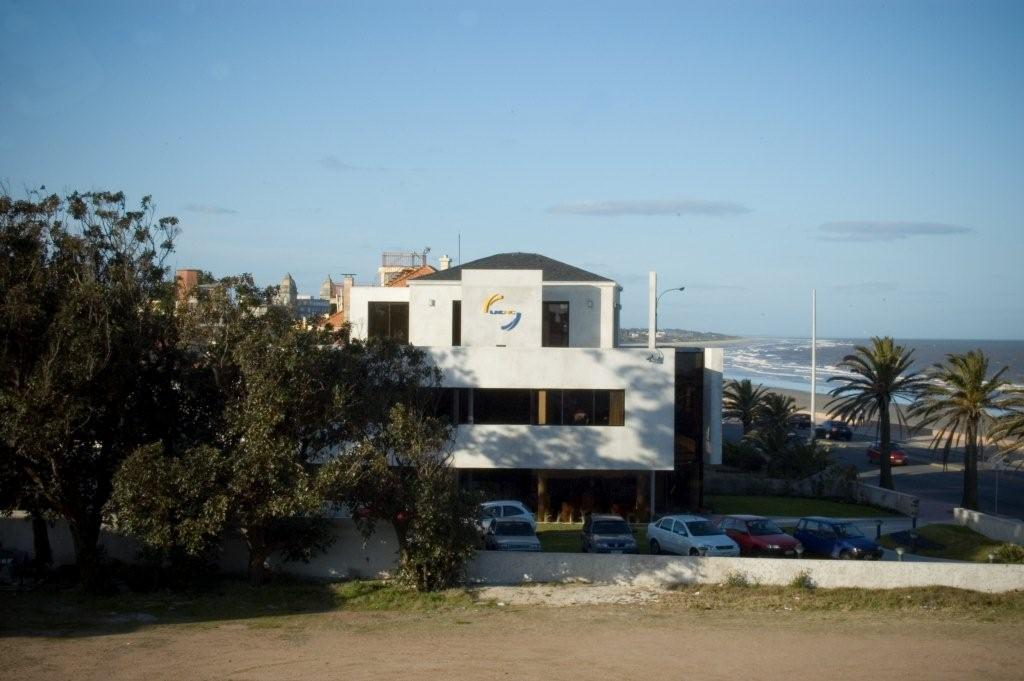
The office building that houses LACNIC in Montevideo, Uruguay.

Latin American and Caribbean Internet Addresses Registry (LACNIC), (Spanish: Registro de Direcciones de Internet para América Latina y Caribe, Brazilian Portuguese: Registro de Endereçamento da Internet para América Latina e Caribe) is the regional Internet registry for the Latin American and Caribbean regions.

LACNIC provides number resource allocation and registration services that support the global operation of the Internet. It is a not-for-profit, membership-based organisation whose members include Internet Service Providers, and similar organisations.

== History ==
Since 1993, academic organizations in Latin America like ENRED – Foro de Redes de América Latina y el Caribe, discussed the need of a register for Latin America, independent from the influence of the United States. In 1998 during an ENRED meeting in Panama including NIC-MX, this theme was discussed and they learned that another group formed by commercial organizations like CABASE (Cámara Argentina de Base de Datos y Servicio en Línea) and ECOM-LAC (Latin America and Caribbean Federation for Internet and Electronic Commerce), were also discussing the idea of a Latin American registry.

On January 30, 1998, Ira Magaziner, then the senior adviser to President Clinton for policy development, released a discussion paper, known as the "green paper" after the DNS root authority incident. A revised version known as the "white paper" was released on June 5. This paper proposed a new organization to handle internet resources (that later became ICANN). The International Forum for the White Paper organized four meetings, the final one in Buenos Aires was attended by South American communication organizations.

Those organizations joined by ECOM-LAC, argued that Latin American IPs addresses could be handled by a local entity and the agreement for creation of LACNIC was signed in Santiago, Chile, on August 22, 1999, during the second ICANN meeting.

An Interim Board was defined with six members:

- AHCIET (Ibero American Association of Research Centers and Telecommunication Companies), Raimundo Beca
- CABASE (Argentine Chamber of Databases and Online Services), Jorge Plano, later substituted by Oscar Messano
- CGI.br, José Luis Ribeiro
- ENRED (Network Forum for Latin America and the Caribbean), Julian Dunayerich; later substituted by Raul Echeverria
- NIC.mx (NIC Mexico), German Valdez
- ECOM-LAC, Fabio Marinho

The agreement to form LACNIC was submitted on August 26, 1999, to Esther Dyson, then Chair of ICANN Interim Board, and the business plan was presented to ARIN. Statutes were created and it was decided that LACNIC headquarters would be in Montevideo, with technicians and equipment in São Paulo, at the NIC.br premises.LACNIC was established in 2001, with administrative offices in Montevideo, Uruguay, and technical facilities provided by CGI.br of São Paulo. The criteria for a new regional Internet registry was formally recognized by ICANN during its Shanghai meeting in 2002.

== Organization ==
LACNIC's main functions are:

- Allocating IPv4 and IPv6 address space, and Autonomous System Numbers
- Maintaining the public Whois Database for the Latin American and Caribbean region
- Reverse DNS delegations
- Representing the interests of the Latin American and Caribbean Internet community on the global stage

=== Governance ===
Today, LACNIC has a total of over 13000 members in the following categories:

1. Active Founding Members: AHCIET, CABASE, CGI-Br, eCOMLAC, ENRED, NIC-Mx
2. Active A Members
  Those who receive IP address space directly from LACNIC or indirectly through national registries NIC Brazil and NIC Mexico, as well as those who have received address space from ARIN corresponding to the address space allocated to LACNIC and who apply for admission.
3. Adhering Members:
  - Organizations based in the LAC region or that carry out their activities mainly in LAC, which are involved in Internet development and/or composed of Internet service providers, make a relevant contribution to Internet-related policies in the region, agree with the goals of LACNIC and apply for admission.
  - Organizations that manage IP addresses that are not part of the address space allocated to LAC and are geographically located in the LAC region.
  - Any person, company or institution designated as such by decision of the LACNIC Member Assembly in recognition of their activities in furtherance of LACNIC's goals.
  - Any natural or legal person who makes a significant financial contribution to support LACNIC.
  - Organizations that receive only an ASN do not become LACNIC members.

=== The Number Resource Organization ===
With the other RIRs, LACNIC is a member of the Number Resource Organization (NRO), which exists to protect the unallocated number resource pool, to promote and protect the bottom-up policy development process, and to be the focal point for input into the RIR system.

== LACNIC region participating nations ==
- Argentina
- Aruba
- Belize
- Bolivia
- Brazil
- Chile
- Colombia
- Costa Rica
- Cuba
- Curaçao
- Dominican Republic
- Ecuador
- El Salvador
- Falkland Islands
- French Guiana (France)
- Guatemala
- Guyana
- Haiti
- Honduras
- Mexico
- Netherlands, (Caribbean) (Bonaire, Saba, Sint Eustatius)
- Nicaragua
- Panama
- Paraguay
- Peru
- Saint Martin
- Sint Maarten
- South Georgia and the South Sandwich Islands (UK)
- Suriname
- Trinidad and Tobago
- Uruguay
- Venezuela

== See also ==
- .lat – a California-based Internet generic top-level domain (gTLD) for Latin American
- Address Supporting Organization (ASO)
- Caribbean Telecommunications Union
- Internet Governance Forum (IGF)
- Number Resource Organization (NRO): an organization of the five RIRs
- World Summit on the Information Society (WSIS)
