= African Declaration on Internet Rights and Freedoms =

Joint statement of principles

The African Declaration on Internet Rights and Freedoms (AfDec) is an initiative to promote an Internet environment that conforms to established human rights standards and meets Africa's social and economic development needs. The Declaration was agreed on at the 2013 African Internet Governance Forum (AfIGF) in Nairobi, Kenya and launched in 2014 at the global Internet Governance Forum in Istanbul, Turkey. It provides a normative framework on which basis recommendations for policy and legislative processes on internet rights, freedoms and governance in Africa are made. They can be applied at national, sub-regional and regional levels.

== Background ==
The AfDec has been developed in response to the increasing access of Africans to the internet. With millions of people engaging online on issues such as political, social, economic and governance matters, many African countries try to control the internet in some kind of way. For example, in 2022, the number of internet users in Africa rose to 565 million, which is six times more than the number of users in 2010. However, many African countries adopted problematic regulations from other countries, which often fail to protect human rights but rather violate them. As an example, China is trying to export its Internet technology to Africa, which is based on an authoritarian cyberspace governance model, in attempt to extend their influence as a 'cyberspace superpower'. As a result, many African countries transformed from low to highly regulated internet environments, not only preventing crime but also restricting critical voices such as criticism of governments. Hence, the AfDec tries "to elaborate on the principles which are necessary to uphold human and people’s rights on the Internet, and to cultivate an Internet environment that can best meet Africa’s social and economic development needs and goals". The AfDec emerged from different issues and trends in Internet regulation and Internet rights that are described in a background paper.

== Drafting and design ==
The African Declaration of Internet Rights and Freedom is built on well-established African human rights documents including the African Charter on Human and Peoples’ Rights (1981), the Windhoek Declaration on Promoting an Independent and Pluralistic African Press (1991), the African Charter on Broadcasting (2001), the Declaration of Principles on Freedom of Expression in Africa (2002) and the African Platform on Access to Information Declaration (2011). The AfDec was envisioned at the 2013 African Internet Governance Forum meeting in Nairobi, Kenya. Subsequently, the drafting process began at a following meeting in 2014. The drafters’ group was led by Edetaen Ojo (executive director of Media Rights Agenda) and developed the contents, purpose and text for the Declaration. They received feedback from an online public consultation and African and international stakeholders.

At the beginning of the drafting process, it became clear that there already have been successful regional projects in the past which defined regional standards for Internet freedom. Those initiatives had an enormous impact in building movements and raising awareness on the highest political levels. The following challenge was to bring these ideas, improvements and goals together into one document for which a meeting in February 2014 was scheduled. This meeting was used to start and build a shared civil society campaign and develop purposes and strategies for the design of an African Declaration of Internet Rights and Freedom.

The drafting started with evaluating the existing principles and Charters, figuring out their main goals and analyzing their strengths and weaknesses. The participants were then divided into groups based on their regional origin and determined their top priorities for a Declaration. “Based on the priorities identified above, participants broke into issue-based groups. Each group picked a priority issue from the lists developed and explored the challenges associated with that right which could be addressed in a Declaration; existing standards in relation to that issue; and what demands should be included in any Declaration with regards to that issue.” Consequently, a list of possible allies was developed, which should be used to gain support and expand the reach of the Declaration. This list included African networks, intergovernmental organizations, funders and donors as well as international supporters.

At the end of this drafting meeting in February 2014 the title of the Declaration was agreed on and a work schedule for the following 7–12 months was designed. The final draft was available for the public by spring and the launch of the then revised AfDec took place in September 2014. The goal was set to promote the Declaration further, especially “in different institutions involved in the dispersed internet governance field, including the African Union and UNESCO”.

== Content ==
The African Declaration of Internet Rights and Freedoms declares 13 key principles regarding Human Rights on the Internet. The declaration applies to all governments, “regional and sub-regional bodies, national governments, civil society organisations, media institutions and relevant Internet companies”. It states that national governments must take measures to “respect, protect and guarantee the rights outlined in this declaration”. These include providing legal frameworks and effective remedies against violations as well as ensuring transparent, well-resourced, independent regulators on the Internet. In practice, the declaration announces that states should implement actions or intensify them and adopt best practices from other African states.

=== Key principles ===
The key principles include:

1. An open infrastructure on the Internet, which allows for the distribution of ideas and a public discourse without discrimination. The restriction of Internet access or speed shall not be permitted.
2. Access to the Internet for all people in Africa without discrimination based on “race, colour, sex, language, religion, political or other opinion, national or social origin, property, birth or other status”
3. Freedom of expression. Any restrictions must be “provided by law, pursue a legitimate aim as expressly listed under international human rights law (namely the rights or reputations of others, the protection of national security, or of public order, public health or morals) and are necessary and proportionate in pursuance of a legitimate aim”. With reference to the Manila Principle of Intermediary Liability it holds that only the author themselves can be held liable for the content and not the platform on which it is published.
4. The right to information. Those information that are produced on public funds have to be made accessible to the people according to minimum standards.
5. The freedom to use the Internet for assembly and association. Any restrictions must be “provided by law, pursue a legitimate aim as expressly listed under international human rights law (namely the rights or reputations of others, the protection of national security, or of public order, public health or morals) and are necessary and proportionate in pursuance of a legitimate aim”.
6. The right to freely choose any language when sharing information on the Internet.
7. The opportunity to use the Internet to make use of one's right to sustainable development.
8. The right to privacy and data protection, specifically the right to anonymity. Any restrictions must be “provided by law, pursue a legitimate aim as expressly listed under international human rights law (namely the rights or reputations of others, the protection of national security, or of public order, public health or morals) and are necessary and proportionate in pursuance of a legitimate aim”.
9. The aim of a trustworthy, stable Internet that is based on cooperation of its stakeholders. Any unlawful surveillance shall not be permitted.
10. The rejection of discrimination and of violations of human rights. States are required to provide a safe environment for free speech. This includes the environment on the Internet and laws for protecting those who engage in public discourse such as journalists and women's and human rights defenders.
11. The right to a fair process for every individual concerning legal claims with regards to the use of the Internet. States must provide equal protection under the law and arbitrary detention or punishment thus shall not be allowed.
12. The right for everyone to participate in an open governance of the Internet. The declaration may not be used to justify the prevention of equality.
13. The recognition of existing gender inequalities in knowledge about and accessing the Internet. This recognition is the premise to be able to tackle them and achieve equal access.

== Reactions and supporters ==
Since the establishment of the Declaration of Internet Rights and Freedoms the group has been active on social media under the Twitter account @AfricaNetRights, promoting their publications from the website updates as well as projects from similar organizations and projects concerning the Internet freedom of Africa. As of mid-June 2022, the declaration has been endorsed by 45 African countries, 9 non-African countries, 151 organizations, and 186 Individuals (totalling 369 supporters).

=== List of coalition members ===
- Africa Centre for Open governance
- Africa Freedom of Information Centre
- alt.advisory
- amaBhungane
- Arid Lands Information Network (Eastern Africa)
- Article 19
- Article 19 Eastern Africa
- Article 19 Senegal et Afrique de L'Ouest
- #ASUTIC - ICT Users Association
- Association for Progressive Communications
- CITAD: Centre for Youth Empowerment and Leadership
- Centre for Human Rights University of Pretoria
- FMFI First Mile First Inch
- Center for MultiLateral Affairs
- Cipesca
- Fundacion Ciudadano Inteligente
- Civicus
- CHRAGG
- Common cause Zambia
- .africa
- ENDCODE
- Global Partners Digital
- Global Voices
- Haki Maendeleo
- TSF - the Institute for Social Accountability
- Irish Council for civil Liberties
- Internet Society Ghana Chapter
- Institute for Public Policy Research
- JamiiForums
- KiCTAnet
- ESCR-Net
- Media Foundation for West Africa (MFWA)
- MediaMonitoring Africa
- Media Rights Agenda
- Media Institute of Southern Africa Malawi
- Media Institute of Southern Africa Zambia
- Media Institute of Southern Africa Zimbabwe
- Motoon
- Namibia Media Trust
- Paradigm Initiative
- Protege QV
- SOS Support Public Broadcasting
- Right2Know
- Rudi International
- South African Human right commission
- South African National Editors' Forum
- Unwanted Witness
- World Wide Web Foundation
- Women of Uganda Network
- YMCA The Gambia

== See also ==
- Internet Governance Forum
- Digital Rights
- Charter of Human Rights and Principles for the Internet
- The Santa Clara Principles
