= European Dialogue on Internet Governance =

European Dialogue on Internet Governance (EuroDIG) is a Pan-European multi-stakeholder forum focused on Internet Governance. It is a regional sub-forum of the global Internet Governance Forum (IGF). It is an annual meeting with open participation and changing locations across European countries. Participants come from the private sector, governments, civil society, academia, and the technical community. Notable participating institutions are the European Commission and the Council of Europe.

== Mission and history ==
EuroDIG held its first meeting on 20–21 October 2008 and was initiated by Internet enthusiasts from all stakeholder groups who shared the same vision of a space where all stakeholders from all across Europe could meet and discuss Internet governance issues. The Council of Europe was among the institutions which supported this idea from the beginning and offered to host the first meeting in the Palais de l'Europe in Strasbourg, the headquarters of the Council of Europe.

One goal of EuroDIG is to feed in European views into the global IGF, but even more it aims to reach out to all concerned groups and facilitated an inclusive debate about the governance of the internet by encouraging cooperation to solve problems and find best practices.

== Organizational structure and finance ==
=== Administration and planning ===
The central administration of EuroDIG is its secretariat, which is responsible for coordinating the organization. The secretariat is composed of 3-4 individuals working part time as of 2022. Long-term and financial planning as well administrative oversight lies with the Multi-stakeholder Board, whose seven members are elected by the General Assembly, except the Secretary General, who is always part of the board. Members of the Board have to be so-called Core Members and are elected for up to three years. The Members should come from different stakeholder groups so that each group is represented and no group dominates the board. The General Assembly is composed of the members of the organization, though only Core Members can vote. Core Members are Founding and Full Members. All Full Members have to be accepted by the Core Members.

The annual meetings are planned in an open process in which everyone can suggest topics and participate. The program is made based on submitted topics and publicly discussed in a planning meeting, usually at the beginning of the year. The details for each session are assigned an Org Team, which organizes the session. The planning process is facilitated by the secretariat in assisting Org Teams.

=== Funding and institutional partners ===
EuroDIG is financed through donations, for the most part by corporations and institutions, but also individuals have an opportunity to support via fundraising tool. Another form of support EuroDIG receives is in the form of hosting the in-person events and providing equipment and resources needed for those, which is usually done by a partnering institution or city.

The institutional partners of EuroDIG are:

- Council of Europe
- European Commission
- European Regional At-Large Organization (EURALO)
- European Broadcasting Union (EBU)
- European Telecommunications Network Operators’ Association (ETNO)
- Geneva Internet Platform
- Internet Corporation for Assigned Names and Numbers (ICANN)
- Internet Society (ISOC)
- Federal Office of Communications of Switzerland (OFCOM)
- Réseaux IP Européens Network Coordination Centre (RIPE NCC)

Besides the above mentioned Institutional Partners donations are received from e.g. EURid, Google, SIDN, nic.at, denic, Centr, .fr, SWITCH, VERISIGN, UNINETT Norid, as well as the Internet Society Foundation, UNU-CRIS, RNIDS and, in a smaller amount, regional companies and private donors.

== Participants ==
In 2021, the forum counted 703 registrations for the 3-day long virtual meeting, of which 470 actually attended the event. In addition, more people took part via live stream. For more than 50% of the participants, it was the first EuroDIG they attended. Moreover, 10% of the participants were members or representatives of governments, whereas nearly a fourth of the 470 people attended from civil society. Less than 20% of the attendants identified as academics. Also, nearly 13% of the participants came from the private sector and the technical community, each. Round about 6% of the participants represented inter-governmental organizations. In 2021, special greeting words were held by Patrick Penninckx (Head of Information Society Department, Council of Europe), Ana Persic (UNESCO), Atish Dabholkar (Director, International Centre for Theoretical Physics), Roberto Viola (Director General for Communications Networks, Content and Technology, European Commission), Tatjana Matić (Minister of Trade, Tourism and Telecommunications, Republic of Serbia), Philippe de Lombaerde (Director Ad Interim of the United Nations University Institute on Comparative Regional Integration Studies) and Delphine Ernotte (Director General France Télévisions and President of EBU). While there was a small overlap of male participants in 2021 (50,6%), nearly 45% of the attendants were females (44,1%). The remaining 5,3% of the participants did not want to state their gender.

== List of meetings ==
Date	Place	Organisers
20.-21.10.2008	Strasbourg, France	Facilitated by Council of Europe
14.-15.09.2009	Geneva, Switzerland	Co-organized by the European Broadcasting Union (EBU) together with the Swiss Federal Office of Communication (OFCOM) and facilitated by the Council of Europe
29.-30.04.2010	Madrid, Spain	Hosted by Telefónica in cooperation with IGF Spain at the Telefónica Headquarters in Madrid
30.-31.05.2011	Belgrad, Serbia	Hosted by DiploFoundation under the chairmanship of Jasna Matić, State Secretary for Digital Agenda in the Ministry of Culture, Media and Information Society of Serbia at the Sava Centre in Belgrade.
14.-15.06.2012	Stockholm, Sweden	Hosted by the Swedish Post and Telecom Authority (PTS) in Stockholm. Queen Silvia of Sweden gave a keynote speech on children's rights and the Internet.
20.-21.06.2013	Lisbon, Portugal	Co-organised by, the Portugal Chapter of the Internet Society (ISOC Portugal), Fundação para a Ciência e a Tecnologia and the Gabinete para os Meios de Comunicação Social (GMCS)
12.-13.06.2014	Berlin, Germany	Hosted by the Association of the German Internet Industry (eco) under the patronage of the Federal Ministry of Economics and Technology in co-operation with the Federal Foreign Office.
04.-05.06.2015	Sofia, Bulgaria	Hosted by UNICART in cooperation with the Bulgarian Ministry of Transport, Information Technology and Communications
09.-10.06.2016	Brussels, Belgium	Hosted by EURid in cooperation with the European Commission
06.-07.06.2017	Tallinn, Estonia	Hosted by Republic of Estonia, Ministry of Foreign Affairs in cooperation with the Estonian Internet Foundation.
05.-06.06.2018	Tbilisi, Georgia	Hosted by the Ministry of Economy and Sustainable Development of Georgia in cooperation with the Small and Medium Telecom Operator's Association of Georgia and the Georgian National Communications Commission.
19.-20.06.2019	The Hague, the Netherlands	Hosted by Ministry of Economic Affairs and Climate Policy of the Netherlands in cooperation with ECP – Netherlands Platform for the Information Society, the Municipality of The Hague and SIDN – the .nl domain registry.
10.-12.06.2020	virtual	First virtual EuroDIG. EuroDIG was a satellite event in the overall programme of the EuroScience Open Forum (ESOF). It was hosted by The Abdus Salam International Centre for Theoretical Physics (ICTP) in cooperation with Scuola Internazionale Superiore di Studi Avanzati (SISSA), the EuroScience Open Forum (ESOF) and the Department of Engineering and Architecture and the STeDIC Interdepartmental Center of the University of Trieste and supported by the Ministry for Technological Innovation and Digitalisation
28.-30.06.2021	virtual	Hosted by The Abdus Salam International Centre for Theoretical Physics (ICTP) in cooperation with the Scuola Internazionale Superiore di Studi Avanzati (SISSA), the Department of Engineering and Architecture and the STeDIC Interdepartmental Center of the University of Trieste supported by the Ministry for Technological Innovation and Digitalisation
20.-22.06.2022	Trieste, Italy	Hosted, once again, by The Abdus Salam International Centre for Theoretical Physics (ICTP)
06.-08.06.2023	Tampere, Finland	Hosted by Tampere University
17.-19.06.2024	Vilnius, Lithuania	Hosted by the Communications Regulatory Authority of Lithuania
12.-14.05.2025	Strasbourg, France	Hosted by the Council of Europe
upcoming: 26.-27.05.2026	Brussels, Belgium	Hosted by EURid

Source for the table information

== Activities of EuroDIG ==
YouthDIG

Each year, EuroDIG holds a preparatory youth event for interested individuals in the age between 18–30. In this YouthDIG the participants are taught about Internet Governance and develop policy messages which are presented at the following EuroDIG and during the IGF.

Those young people are invited to exchange as well as discuss ideas with experienced Internet policy practitioners. Also, they get the opportunity to connect with peers throughout Europe who have similar interests.

== Relationship to other Internet Governance Institutions ==
EuroDIG was established, with support from the Council of Europe, Swiss OFCOM and other stakeholders, following the commissioning of the Internet Governance Forum (IGF) by the Secretary General of the United Nations in 2006. Its debates and messages are fed into the global forum. Similar to the IGF, EuroDIG has no executive capacity and exists only as a place for discussion.

However, EuroDIG has access to important decision makers in internet policy in Europe, including the Council of Europe, the European Commission (through DG-Connect), ICANN, and members of the European Parliament. By organising EuroDIG in another European country every year the forum built relations with local authorities and governments across Europe as well as various European-wide bodies dealing with internet government issues.

Moreover, EuroDIG supported the creation of SEEDIG ("South Eastern European Dialogue on Internet Governance") which is a sub-regional IGF founded in 2015. EuroDIG offered to host the first meeting as a pre-event to EuroDIG in Sofia so that SEEDIG could build relationships between their community and key partners across Europe.

== See also ==
- Internet Governance Forum (IGF)
- African Internet Governance Forum (AfIGF)
- South Eastern European Dialogue on Internet Governance (SEEDIG)
