= David Vyorst =

David Vyorst (January 14, 1961 – December 7, 2017) was an American internet governance leader, advocate for free speech, online privacy, and democratic governance. He served as the executive director of the Washington, D.C. chapter of the Internet Society and co-chaired the Internet Governance Forum USA.

== Early life and education ==
Born around 1961, David Vyorst was born to a Jewish family in New York City. His experiences growing up influenced his later film-making work.

== Career ==
Vyorst's first notable documentary film was The First Basket (2008), which gained positive critical acclaim. The film explored the role of Jewish athletes in the rise of basketball and the National Basketball Association (NBA).

Vyorst became involved in internet governance. As the executive director of the Washington, D.C. chapter of the Internet Society and co-chair of the Internet Governance Forum USA, he organized numerous events over the span of a decade. These events brought together groups of individuals to discuss internet-related issues such as free speech, online privacy, and democratic governance.

== Death ==
David Vyorst died on December 7, 2017.
