= South Eastern European Dialogue on Internet Governance =

South Eastern European Dialogue on Internet Governance (SEEDIG) is an officially recognized subregional multistakeholder Internet Governance Forum on Internet and digital policy issues. This subregional IGF National and Regional Initiative (NRI) is of particular relevance for South East Europe and its neighbours. SEEDIG has been founded in 2014 and is structured as an open and informal space for different stakeholders to discuss Internet-related issues. Annual forums are held in different parts of the region. The first annual forum was held in June 2015 in Sofia, Bulgaria.

== History and Mission ==
In 2014, SEEDIG was founded in a “bottom-up manner” responding to a desire for a forum focusing on the need of the South Eastern European region with its own issues regarding Internet governance. Conversations about Internet governance were not as prominent in South East Europe since other political topics dominated. During the 2014 Internet Governance Forum (IGF) meeting in Istanbul, representatives of the Internet Corporation for Assigned Names and Numbers (ICANN) and members of the Internet community in South East Europe started the conversation about a possible organization focusing on Internet governance in the specific region. SEEDIG started to operate as an annual regional Internet governance forum in 2015. Like the global IGF SEEDIG cannot make any decisions concerning (regional) Internet policy itself. Rather, it brings together various stakeholders from private companies, governments, international organizations, civil society, and the technical community in order to facilitate networking and substantive discussion.

== List of Meetings ==
SEEDIG hosted a number of in-person meetings since its first convening in 2015. Since the beginning of the COVID-19 pandemic all the meetings have taken place online. In 2021 the 7 Series of SEEDIG included seven different meetings held over a period of six months (June 2021 to November 2021).

Name	Place	Date
SEEDIG 8	Zagreb, Croatia	6-7 November 2023
7 Series	online	June to November 2021
SEEDIG 6	online	21-25 September 2020
SEEDIG 5	Bucharest, Romania	7-8 May 2019
SEEDIG 2018	Ljubljana, Slovenia	23-24 May 2018
SEEDIG 2017	Ohrid, North Macedonia	24-25 May 2017
SEEDIG 2016	Belgrade, Serbia	22 April 2016
SEEDIG 2015	Sofia, Bulgaria	3 June 2015

== Participation ==
Everyone can participate in the online meetings of SEEDIG. The current participants of SEEDIG come from many different backgrounds, illustrating the format's multistakeholder nature. There are stakeholders such as UN bodies and key European institutions like the European Commission or the Council of Europe. Other stakeholders include the Internet Society, ICANN, RIPE Network Coordination Centre, national regulatory authorities, business associations, civil society organisations and academic institutions throughout the South East European region.

== Relationship to other Internet Governance Institutions ==
Within the IGF system SEEDIG interacts with national IGFs in the broader South East Europe region as well as with both the global IGF and the European Dialogue on Internet Governance (EuroDIG). The latter offered its support to SEEDIG from the start and provided the necessary platform and network to kickstart a sub-regional organization. Through the support of EuroDIG, SEEDIG was able to gain visibility and focus on the main issues concerning Internet governance. For instance, in 2015, the first SEEDIG meeting was held as a pre-event to EuroDIG. Ever since, SEEDIG has been working together with EuroDIG on building and strengthening synergies between the two initiatives. SEEDIG's relationship with EuroDIG includes a joint call for discussion of topics and other joint initiatives, as well as participation in the annual EuroDIG meetings. SEEDIG contributes to the global IGF in several ways, e.g. through the submission of annual meeting reports, participation in annual IGF Meetings and the contribution to IGF intersessional activities. SEEDIG's relationships with South East European NRIs include joint online and in-person meetings to discuss common topics. Members of national IGF initiatives have been active contributors to SEEDIG intersessional activities, such as the monthly SEEsummary. Examples of initiatives SEEDIG contributed to and/or supported over the years include Armenia IGF, Bosnia and Herzegovina IGF, Georgia IGF, Moldova IGF and Youth IGF Turkey. Representatives of other regional institutions, such as the Council of Europe or European Commission with a stake in Internet governance regularly contribute to SEEDIG's annual meetings.

== See also ==
- Internet Governance Forum
- EuroDIG
