= Nepal IGF =

Nepal Internet Governance
- Abbreviation: NPIGF
- Formation: 2017
- Legal status: Non-profit
- Purpose: Leadership
- Headquarters: Kathmandu
- Location: Nepal
- Region served: Asia Pacific
- Official language: English
- Parent organization: Internet Governance Forum
- Affiliations: Internet
- Website: igf.org.np//

Nepal Internet Governance Forum is an initiative of the Internet Governance Forum with the overall concept of multistakeholderism and Internet for development and growth. The Nepal IGF declaration was signed on 21 February 2017 where a multistakeholder steering committee (MSG) has been formed for the commencement of the Nepal IGF in June 2017.

Signatories of Nepal IGF

Name	Stakeholder	Affiliation
Birendra Kumar Mishra	Government	Department of Information Technology
Ananda Raj Khanal	Government	Nepal Telecommunication Authority
Babu Ram Aryal	Civil Society	FDE
Suman Lal Pradhan	Private Sector	ISP Association of Nepal
Subhash Dhakal	Government	Department of Information Technology
Hempal Shrestha	Civil Society	FOSS Nepal
Dr. Sanjeev Prasad Pandey	Academia	Institute of Engineering, Tribhuvan University
Indiver Badal	Technical Community	npIX
Samit Jana	Technical Community	npNOG
Kishor Panth	Private Sector	Cloud Security Alliance
Binay Bihara	Private Sector	Vianet Communications Private Limited
Sunaina Ghimire Pandey	Private Sector	TechOne Global Nepal
Binod Dhakal	Civil Society	FCAN
Bikram Shrestha	Civil Society	ISOC Nepal
Ujjwal Acharya	Media	Center for Media Research - Nepal
Prabesh Subedi	Media	Online Journalists Association
Shreedeep Rayamajhi	Civil Society	RayZnews
Dikshya Raut	End User Community	

Nepal IGF	Date	Location	Website
2 Nepal IGF	2–3 November 2018	Hotel Himalaya, Kupandol Kathmandu	http://2018.igf.org.np/
1 Nepal IGF	18–19 August 2017	Hotel Yellow Pagoda, Kantipath Kathmandu	http://igf.org.np/nepal-igf-2017-2/venue

== Nepal IGF 2019 ==
Program Committee

- Hempal Shrestha
- Eswari Sharma
- Jyotsana Maskey
- Sahajman Shrestha
- Shreedeep Rayamajhi
- Amrita Khakurel
- Ramkrishna Pariyar
- Prabesh Subedi

== Nepal IGf 2018 ==
Program Committee

- Hempal Shrestha (Coordinator)
- Indivar Badal
- Jyotsana Maskey
- Sahajman Shrestha
- Shehnaj Banu
- Shiwa Karmacharya
- Shiva Kumar Pokhrel
- Shreedeep Rayamajhi

== Nepal IGF 2017 ==
Program Committee

- Babu Ram Aryal
- Bikram Shrestha
- Binod Dhakal
- Dr. Sanjeev Pandey
- Kishor Panth
- Sarita Bhushal
- Sahajman Shrestha
- Shreedeep Rayamajhi
- Subhash Dhakal
