= African Internet Governance Forum =

The African Internet Governance Forum (AfIGF) is a multistakeholder forum that facilitates dialogue on Internet governance issues. It is one of the 19 regional IGF initiatives and aims to address and discuss the issues of all 54 nations in Africa.

== Mission and history ==
The African Internet Governance Forum was established during the global IGF held in Nairobi in 2011. 2nd to 4 September, the Council of Ministers of ICT of the African Union approved of the institution.

The first AfIGF meeting, where participants determined its terms of reference, took place in Cairo in 2012. Since then, eight other meetings have followed.

== Organisational structure and finance ==
=== Secretariat ===
AfIGF’s secretariat is structured in a similar way to the global IGF’s secretariat. Its host is the United Nations Economic Commission for Africa (UNECA) and it also receives support from the African Union Commission. It is located in Addis Abbaba.

The secretariat’s duties include administrative, logistical and organizational tasks, promotion of the members’ AfIGF activities and maintaining AfIGF and itself. It gathers the knowledge and resources about AfIGF and manages sub-regional and national IGFs in Africa while overviewing the different sub-regional and national IGF’s needs. Moreover, the secretariat summons AfIGF meetings and provide up-to-date information about AfIGF to the public.

=== Bureau ===
The Bureau of the African Internet Governance Forum consists of the five regional IGF conveners or their designates. The host country of the last AfIGF chairs the bureau.

=== Funds ===
The AfIGF’s meetings are financed by the host country. The forum also receives funds from different organizations, such as PRIDA, UNDESA, ICANN and AFRINIC.

== Participants and participation ==
Participants come from all African member states and Africa's subregional IGFs (WAIGF, EAIGF, SAIGF, FGIAC and NAIGF). In addition, academia, the private sector, the civil society, and regional and international organizations are also involved.

Number of AfIGF participants per meeting
Meeting (year)	Number of participants	Number of countries represented
2013	195	29
2014	>470 + 214 remote participants	40
2015	>150 + 30 remote participants	>41
2016	>200	>30
2017	>300	>30
2018	>300	26
2021	695 (only remotely)	

Registration to participate in an AfIGF meeting is possible online.

== AfIGF meetings ==
The African Internet Governance Forum hosts fora annually. It also represents the African continent at global IGFs and holds workshops there. Every year, the AfIGF is hosted by another country:

1. AfIGF 2012, Cairo, Egypt: The first meeting of the AfIGF was hosted by the government of Egypt and held in Cairo from 2 to 4 October 2012. Three workshops were held prior to the conference. The first workshop was organized by ECA, the second was held by Google, APC and NPCA and the third by OIF. There were also reports from the five sub-regional IGFs and from several countries. The conference was rounded off with various presentations, e.g. on access and diversity, security, openness and privacy as well as the African digital representation strategy, and several recommendations were made.
2. AfIGF 2013, Nairobi, Kenya: The second AfIGF took place in Nairobi in Kenya from the 11th to the 13th of September, 2013 and was organized by the Government of Kenya, the AUC, UNEVCA and TESPOK. The main theme for the second meeting was "Building Bridges – Enhancing Multi-stakeholder Cooperation for Growth and Sustainable Development". Conference topics included multi-stakeholder cooperation, infrastructure development, security, openness, and access and security. The three pre-conference workshops addressed multi-stakeholder-participation in ICT policy processes in Africa, Cyber security in Africa and data protection in Francophone African countries. Several recommendations were formulated.
3. AfIGF 2014, Abuja, Nigeria: The third meeting of the AfIGF took place in Abuja, Nigeria, from the 10th to the 12th of July, 2014. The overall theme of the meeting was “Connecting Africa for enhanced multistakeholder Internet governance”. Organizers of the conferences were the Federal Ministry of Communications and Information Technology and the ECA, supported by other institutions. Again, there were workshops, reports and panel discussions before the forum.
4. AfIGF 2015, Addis Ababa, Ethiopia: The fourth AfIGF meeting was held in Addis Ababa, Ethiopia from 6 to 8 September 2015, after the Ministerial Conference on Communication and ICT. The AUC and UNECA organized the forum in cooperation with the NEPAD Agency and were supported by different entities. The objectives of the forum included discussing Africa’s common position on internet governance. Four different pre-conference workshops were held: “African Virtual Library and Information Network (AVLIN)”, “WSIS Follow up”, “UNESCO Internet Study” and “Internet and Human Rights and Capacity building needs for IG and Internet public policy dialogues”. The discussions lead to some conclusions and recommendations.
5. AfIGF 2016, eThekwini, Kwazulu Natal, Durban: The fifth meeting of the AfIGF was held in eThekwini, Kwazulu Natal, Durban from the 16th to the 18th of October 2016. Several presentations were presented during the main conference, covering topics such as internet innovation, security and privacy, the role of libraries, gender divide in the digital transformation and the role of internet governance concerning development goals. The meeting was streamed live with over 1200 spectators.
6. AfIGF 2017, Sharm El Sheikh, Egypt: The 6th AfIGF meeting took place in Sharm El-Sheikh in Egypt from the 4th to 6 December 2017 under the slogan “Enabling an Inclusive Digital Transformation of Africa”. The conference was organized by the AUC in cooperation with the National Telecom Regulatory Authority of Egypt and the NEPAD Coordination Agency. The sessions covered different topics, e.g. DNS and policy making, digital transformation, internet freedom and cybersecurity. Right before the AfIGF meeting, the African School on Internet Governance was held from November 28 to December 2, and the North Africa IGF (NAIGF) took place from 2nd to 3 December 2017.
7. AfIGF 2018, Khartoum, Sudan: In 2018, the seventh AfIGF meeting happened in Khartoum in Sudan from the 4th to 6 November, organized by the AUC in cooperation with the government of Sudan and supported by different entities. The annual motto was “Development of the Digital Economy and Emerging Technologies in Africa”. Parallel sessions addressed various topics, e. g. achieving more (non-discriminatory) internet access and legal issues like human rights and protection of children and youth. Other sessions included talks about “Internet shutdowns”, “African court for online conflict resolution” and “Cybersecurity for the use and harnessing of ICT”. In addition, there was a consultation meeting, an inducting session, several plenary sessions, hosted by various people.
8. AfIGF 2020, virtual: Due to the COVID-19 pandemic, the eighth AfIGF was held virtually from the 24th to the 27th of November, 2020. The African Youth Internet Governance Forum took place on November 24 as well. The AfIGF conference consisted of different parallel workshop sessions and plenary sessions about data (e.g. “Key issues in Data protection policy making and implementation”), economy (e.g. “The digital economy in Africa, possibilities and challenges”), inclusion (e.g. “Safe, stable and reliable internet: digital rights of citizens”), policies (e.g. “Policy Consideration for Community Networks in Africa”), youth (e.g. “E-commerce: What challenges and opportunities for entrepreneurial youth”) and more.
9. AfIGF 2021, virtual: The tenth meeting of the AfIGF also took place virtually from the 14th to the 16th of December 2021 with the motto “Advancing digital transformation in Africa in the face of Crisis”. The conference was organized by the government of Nigeria and supported by different partners. It consisted of parallel workshops and plenary sessions. Some workshops also addressed the pandemic, e.g. the session “Covid 19, Digital Rights and Impacts on Communities in Africa” by IGF Camaeroon or the session “Barriers and opportunities: The state of Internet access and affordability in African countries during the COVID-19 pandemic”.

== African School on Internet Governance ==
In addition to the African Internet Governance Forum, there is the African School on Internet Governance (AfriSIG), which is co-convened by the Association for Progressive Communications, the Information Society Division of the African Union Commission (AUC) and Research ICT Africa. Its objective is promoting collaboration among various stakeholders in national to global internet policy and development. First held in Durban (South Africa) in 2013 (with 13 participants from 12 countries), the ninth annually course took place virtually from the 4th to the 15th of October 2021, addressing digitalization, internet governance and architecture, social issues like human rights and gender in the context of internet governance, cybersecurity and content-regulation. The participants were experienced in the field of internet governance or information technology and members of designated stakeholder groups.

== Relationship to other internet governance institutions ==
As one of the 19 regional IGF initiatives, the AfIGF is connected to the global IGF. Its role is to bring in topics from the African continent to the global IGF and it is committed to ensure that all Africans benefit from a viable information society. The forum also ensures a multistakeholder representation from Africa at the global IGF and promotes exchange between different stakeholders and countries.

There are also five sub-regional Internet Governance initiatives: West Africa Internet Governance Forum (WAIGF), East Africa Internet Governance Forum (EAIGF), North Africa Internet Governance Forum (NAIGF), Southern Africa Internet Governance Forum (SAIGF) and the Forum de Gouvernance de lÌnternet en Afrique Centrale (FGI-CA).

== See also ==
- African Declaration on Internet Rights and Freedoms
- Internet Governance Forum (IGF)
- United Nations Department of Economic and Social Affairs (UNDESA)
- United Nations Economic Commission for Africa (UNECA)
- EuroDIG
