= AFRINIC =

Regional Internet registry for Africa

Coordinates: 20.2450°S 57.4916°E

African Network Information Centre
- Abbreviation: AFRINIC
- Formation: 11 October 2004
- Type: Nonprofit organization
- Headquarters: Ebene, Mauritius
- Services: Allocation and registration of Internet numbers (IP addresses and ASNs)
- Official languages: English (primary), French (secondary)
- Chair of Board of Directors: Adewale Adedokun
- Vice-Chair of Board of Directors: Aziz Hilali
- Chief Executive Officer: Vacant; Mike Silber (starting 1 January 2027)
- Affiliations: IANA, ICANN, NRO, ASO
- Staff: 43
- Website: www.afrinic.net

AFRINIC (African Network Information Centre) is the regional Internet registry (RIR) for Africa and nearby islands in the Indian Ocean, responsible for allocating and registering Internet Protocol (IP) addresses and autonomous system numbers (ASNs) in its service region. It also provides related technical and administrative services that support the Internet in Africa. Established in 2004, with headquarters in Ebene, Mauritius, AFRINIC is one of five regional Internet registries that coordinate a fundamental part of the technical infrastructure of the Internet.

AFRINIC is a not-for-profit organization with about 2,400 members across 56 countries in its service region. Members include Internet service providers, Internet exchange points, governments, academic institutions, and other organizations and businesses that operate computer networks. AFRINIC allocates IP address space to members, maintains registration databases, develops policies in consultation with members and the wider Internet community, and provides technical training for network operators. It provides two types of IP addresses for members to use in their networks: IPv4 addresses, which are well-supported but scarce, and IPv6 addresses, which have less widespread support but are plentiful. The organization charges members annual fees to cover its operational costs.

AFRINIC has had significant organizational and legal problems. In 2019, a news website alleged that a staff member had modified the registration information for 4.1 million IPv4 addresses to sell them on the grey market. In 2020, AFRINIC and a member company, Cloud Innovation Ltd, began a series of legal disputes related to IPv4 address allocation, which led to frozen assets, many injunctions, and, in 2022, the dissolution of the organization's board of directors by the Supreme Court of Mauritius. AFRINIC operated under court-appointed receivership starting in 2023. In June 2025, the receiver tried to conduct a board election, but halted it due to concerns about electoral integrity. The receiver held a successful board election in September 2025. Cloud Innovation has continued lawsuits against AFRINIC, including a petition to the Supreme Court to dissolve the organization.

== Operations and programs ==
=== Internet numbers ===
Example of delegation of large IP address blocks from IANA to regional Internet registries such as APNIC and AFRINIC, which in turn allocate smaller blocks to ISPs and other network operators

The Internet relies on unique numbers, called Internet Protocol (IP) addresses, that identify each device connected to the Internet. As a regional Internet registry, AFRINIC receives large blocks of these numbers from the Internet Assigned Numbers Authority (IANA), which is affiliated with the nonprofit Internet Corporation for Assigned Names and Numbers (ICANN). AFRINIC is responsible for the allocation and registration of IP addresses and related autonomous system numbers (ASNs) for Internet service providers and other network operators in its service region, which includes Africa and part of the Indian Ocean.

There are two types of IP addresses, each with a specific length and format. Regional internet registries manage IPv4 addresses, which are short and well-supported but in limited supply (see IPv4 address exhaustion), along with IPv6 addresses, which are long and plentiful but not yet supported by all systems (see IPv6 deployment). AFRINIC manages about 6% of the global IPv4 address pool, a smaller amount per capita than other regions.

Map of the number of people using the Internet per country in Africa. In 2024, this included 96 million in Nigeria, 87M in Egypt, and 50M in South Africa.

As of 2023, about a third of AFRINIC's ASNs are allocated to South Africa, and about half of its ASNs are allocated to South Africa, Nigeria, and Kenya. Among its IPv4 addresses, 55% are allocated to South Africa, Egypt, and Morocco. South Africa and Egypt have 86% of IPv6 addresses assigned.

==== WHOIS database ====
The AFRINIC WHOIS database contains registration details of IP address blocks and ASNs that it allocated. The database shows the organizations that hold the resources, where the allocations were made, and contact details for the networks. Resource holders are responsible for updating their information in the database. It can be searched by using the web interface on the AFRINIC site or by directing a whois client to whois.afrinic.net. AFRINIC also supports the Registration Data Access Protocol, the successor to the WHOIS protocol.

==== Routing security support ====
Internet Routing Registries (IRR) operated by RIRs facilitate Internet traffic, including improving the security of Border Gateway Protocol routing. Originally AFRINIC encouraged members to register their Internet number resources with the Réseaux IP Européens Network Coordination Centre (RIPE NCC). In 2013, AFRINIC established its own IRR. Staff reported that 1,767 members used its IRR in 2024.

However, IRR entries can be inconsistent or inaccurate. AFRINIC also supports Resource Public Key Infrastructure (RPKI), a way to use public key certificates to verify the association between Internet numbers and the organization authorized to use them. RPKI improves the security of the Internet by reducing the risk of Border Gateway Protocol hijacking. In 2025, staff reported that 720 members have adopted RPKI, with 11,216 Route Origin Authorizations.

==== Domain Name System services ====
AFRINIC enables reverse DNS lookup for its IPv4 and IPv6 address blocks, allowing people to look up an IP address allocated by AFRINIC and find any associated domain names in the Domain Name System (DNS). AFRINIC also publishes reverse DNS zone data, including to support Domain Name System Security Extensions (DNSSEC).

To improve the resiliency of DNS in its service region, AFRINIC offers secondary DNS hosting services for primary name servers in Africa. This service is used by the operators of some African country code top-level domains. Operating and using DNS name servers and other Internet infrastructure within Africa increases the speed of Internet traffic and reduces related costs.

=== Policy development ===
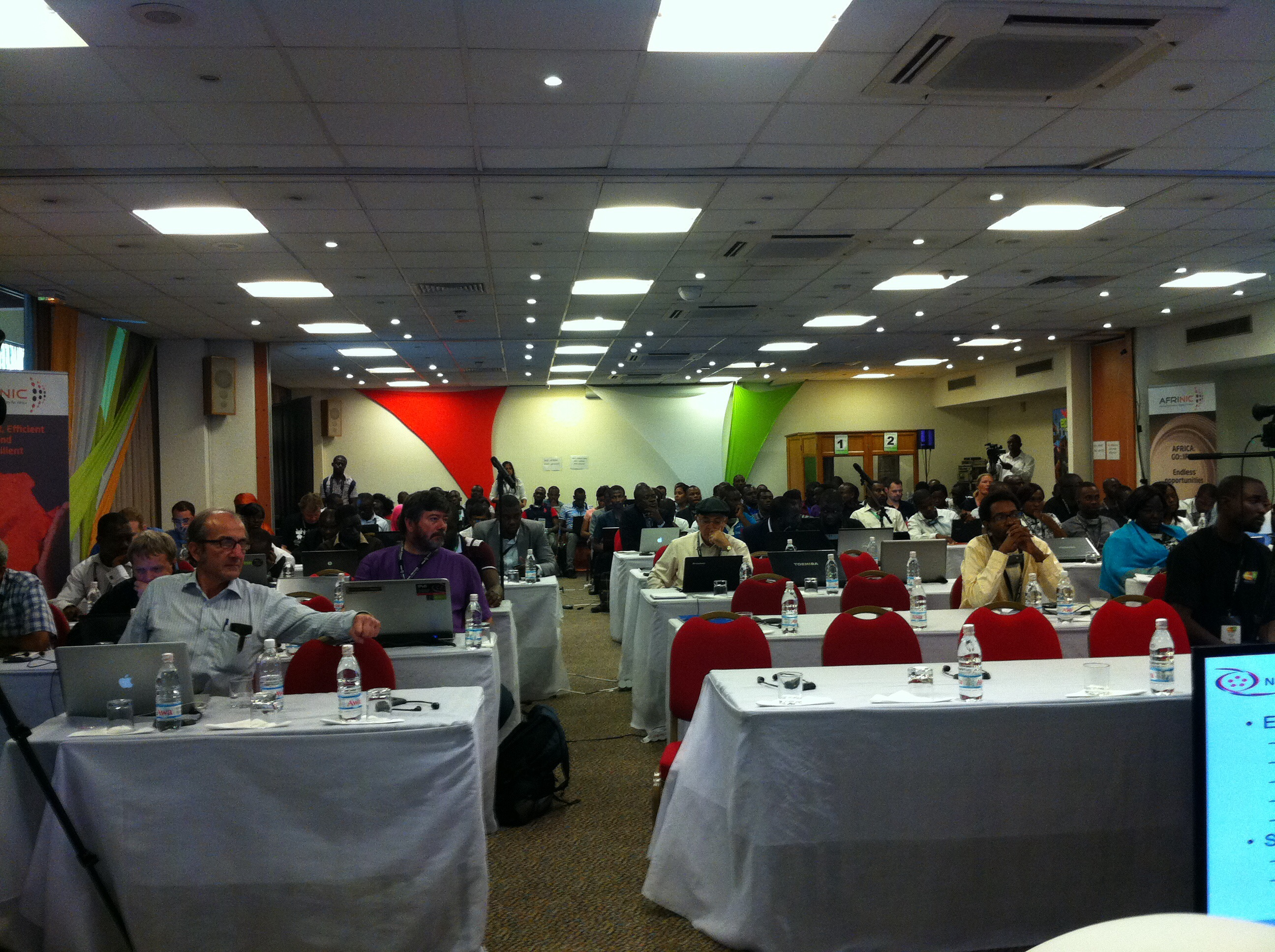
Public policy meeting in 2013 in Abidjan, Ivory Coast

Staff develop AFRINIC's Internet number allocation policies in collaboration with the organization's members as well as the broader Internet community. Representatives from governments, standards organizations, companies, academia, news media, the technical community, civil society, and other not-for-profit organizations participate in AFRINIC meetings, which include policy discussions.

The primary forums for policy development are public policy meetings and mailing list discussions. Each year, AFRINIC conducts two public policy meetings that give members and other stakeholders the chance to come together for policy development, information sharing, and networking. The first public policy meeting of each year is part of the Africa Internet Summit, which is an annual multi-stakeholder event co-organized by the African Network Operators Group, and the second is held as a standalone meeting. The meetings take place in various locations throughout Africa.

Together with the four other regional Internet registries, AFRINIC is part of the Number Resource Organization, which serves as the ICANN Address Supporting Organization. This enables the RIRs to coordinate with each other and make joint policy recommendations to ICANN.

=== Capacity building and partnerships ===
As part of AFRINIC's capacity building initiatives, staff conduct training courses for network administrators, network architects, and other network engineers across its service region. Workshops include Internet number resource management and implementation of IPv6 networks. AFRINIC also offers online training courses on topics including IPv6 deployment, Internet number resource management, DNSSEC, and RPKI.

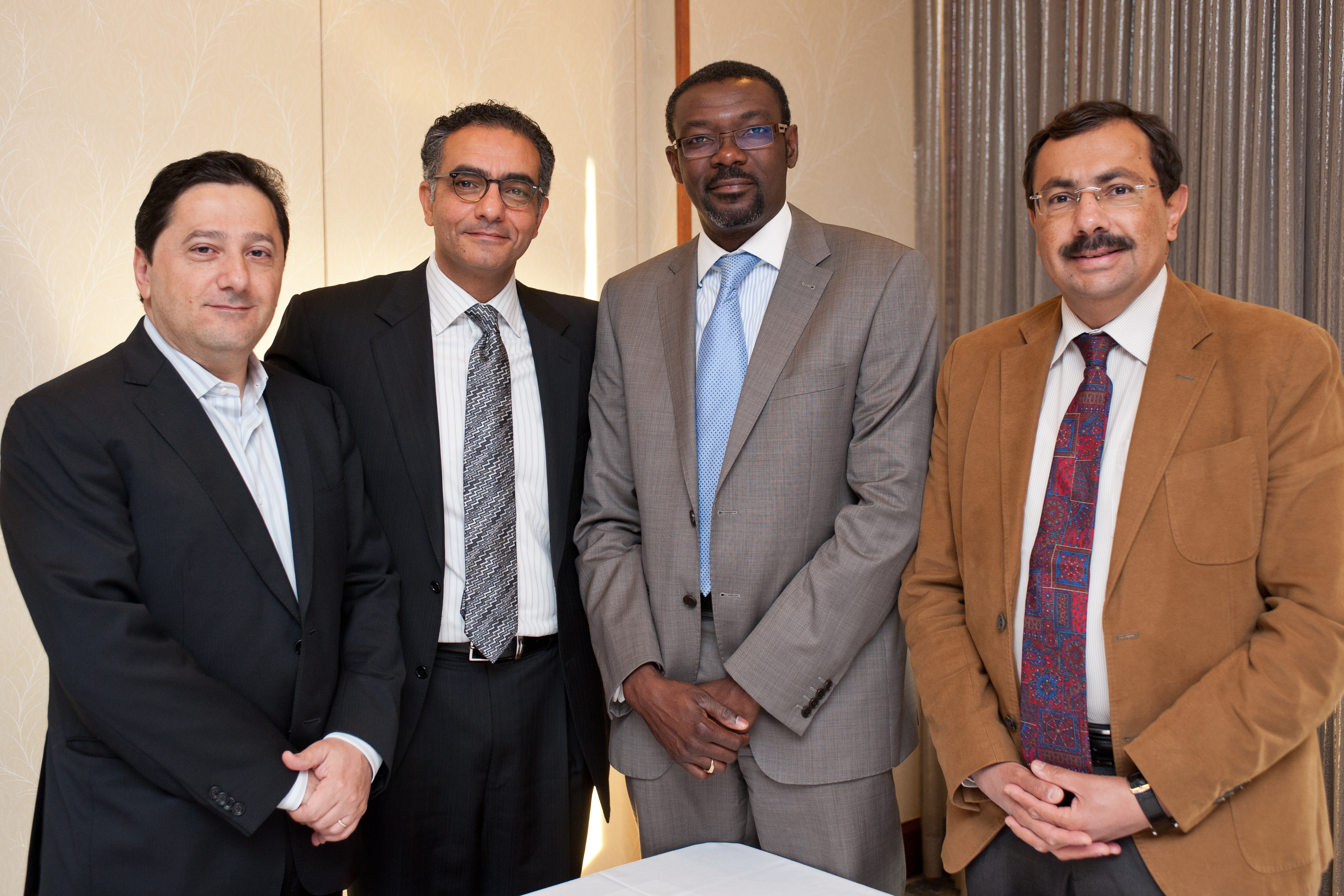
ICANN leaders and AFRINIC CEO Adiel Akplogan together in 2012 to establish an initiative to expand root name server instances in Africa

In 2021, AFRINIC and the African Telecommunications Union established a partnership to accelerate adoption of IPv6 networks in Africa, due to IPv4 address exhaustion, and to develop tools to measure Internet performance. AFRINIC has supported the deployment of regional root name server copies that are compatible with both IPv4 and IPv6.

AFRINIC and the Internet Society have worked together to train staff of Internet exchange points and Internet service providers to support routing more of Africa's internet traffic within the continent instead of externally. The organizations have also partnered on measurement initiatives to evaluate Internet performance and reliability across Africa. For example, they built a route analysis tool to learn about and monitor the amount of interconnection between Internet exchange points within Africa. Together with MANRS, they have also trained network engineers for national research and education networks to improve the security of their networks.

To promote Internet expansion in Africa, AFRINIC has administered grants through its Fund for Internet Research and Development (FIRE Africa).

== Organization ==
As required by ICANN policy for regional Internet registries, AFRINIC is a non-profit, non-governmental, community-led entity. The relevant ICANN policy is Internet Coordination Policy 2 (ICP-2), "Criteria for Establishment of New Regional Internet Registries".

=== Service region ===
Map of regional Internet registries, showing AFRINIC's service region

AFRINIC's service region is the continent of Africa and adjacent islands in the Atlantic and Indian Oceans, including Madagascar. It is divided into six sub-regions to ensure regional representation on the organization's board of directors: Eastern Region, Western Region, Central Africa, Northern Africa, Southern Africa, and Indian Ocean.

=== Members ===
Membership is open to individuals, companies, organizations, and governments that are based in and providing services in Africa. Companies and organizations with memberships include Internet service providers, Internet exchange points, data centers, universities, and banks.

=== Board of directors ===
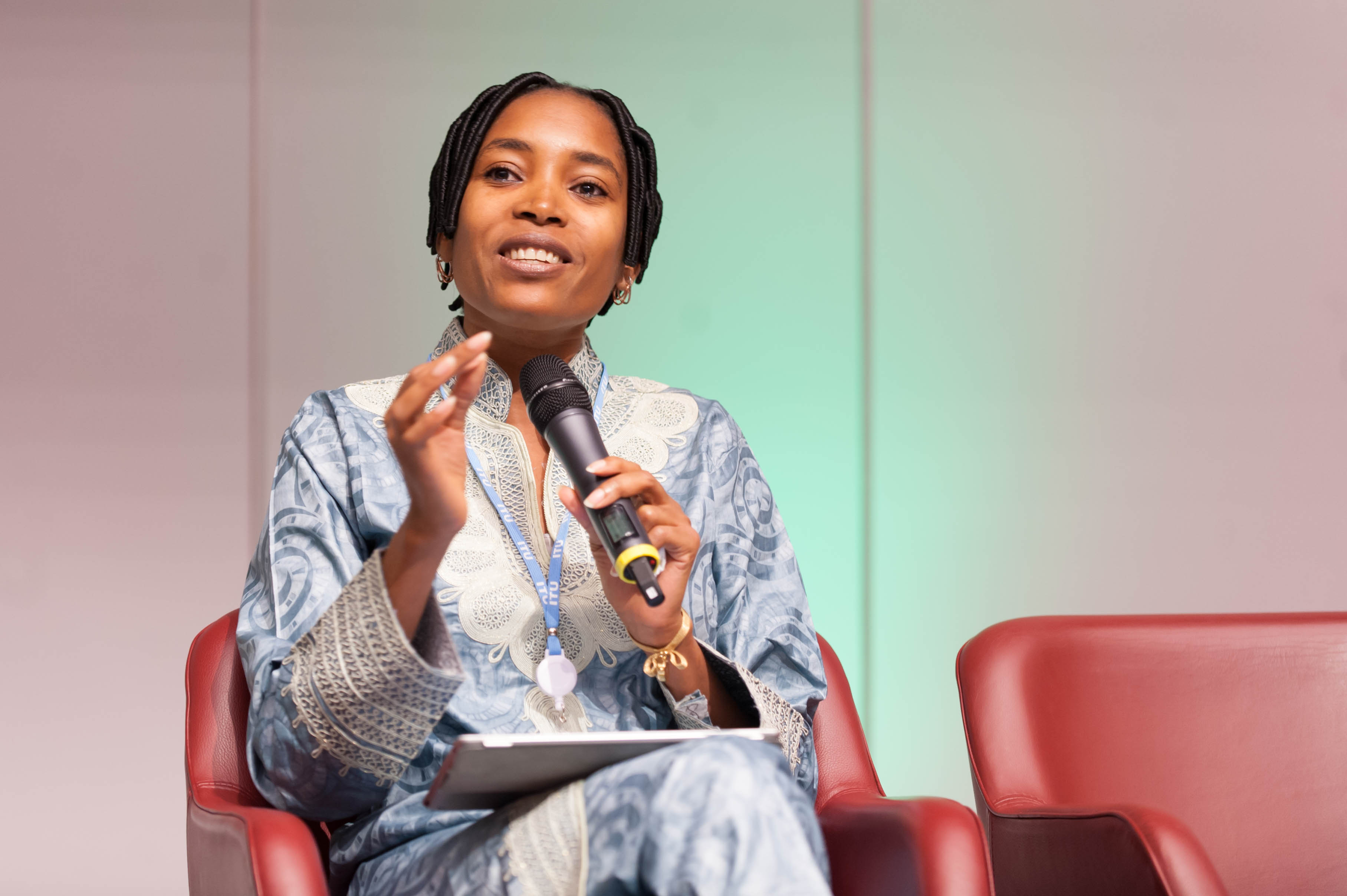
AFRINIC director Aminata Garba at the World Summit on the Information Society in 2016

The organization's by-laws prescribe a nine-member board of directors. Six directors are elected to represent the six sub-regions, and two directors are elected based on professional expertise. The last seat on the board is filled by the chief executive officer.

Members elect directors at annual general member meetings, normally in May or June. The organization's bylaws define quorum for this meeting as the presence of four regional directors, one non-regional director, and five members. Members vote at the meeting and prior to the meeting via electronic voting. The elected directors serve three-year terms.

The directors elect a chair of the board and a vice-chair. The directors appoint a chief executive officer, which is a staff role.

=== Council of Elders ===
The AFRINIC Council of Elders, which consists of up to six former board chairs, advises the board. The council is not elected by organization members. In 2023, the Council of Elders consisted of Nii N. Quaynor, Pierre S. Dandjinou, Viv Padayatchy, Maimouna Ndeye Diop Diagne, and Christian Bope.

=== Staff ===
Staff carry out the daily operations of the organization, including technical and administrative responsibilities. The staff is structured in several departments: CEO's Office, Finance and Accounting, People and Productivity, Capacity Building, Communications and Public Relations, Infrastructure and Security, Member Services, Registry Products, Stakeholder Development, and Value Added Services.

== History ==
=== Formation ===
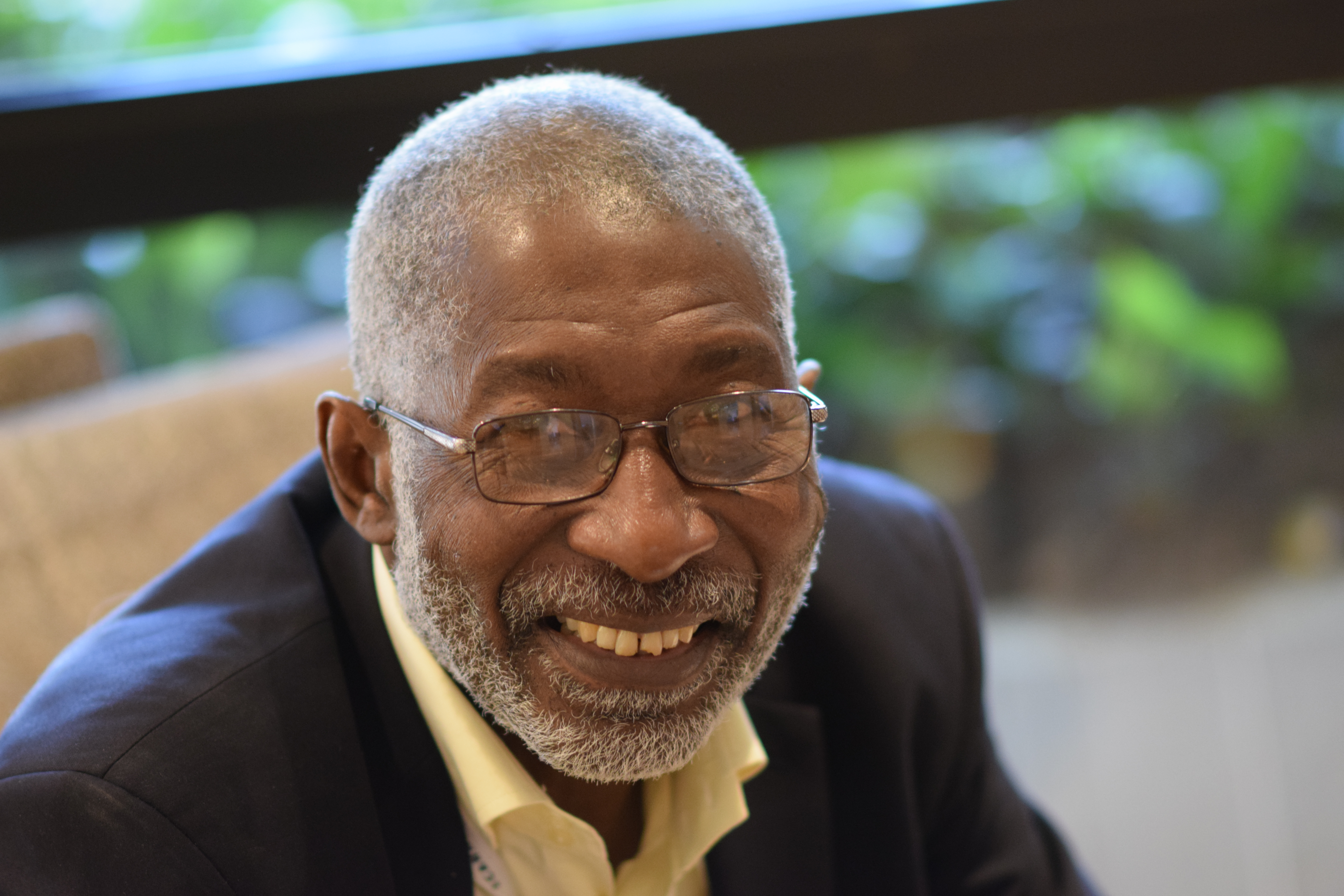
Nii Quaynor, founding chairman of AFRINIC

Before AFRINIC formed, IP addresses for Africa were distributed by the Asia-Pacific Network Information Centre (APNIC), the American Registry for Internet Numbers (ARIN), and the RIPE NCC. At an Internet Society conference workshop in Malaysia in 1997, Alan Barrett, Nii Quaynor, Sana Bellamine, and Nasha Abdel-Baki developed a proposal for an African regional Internet registry. An initial board of trustees came together in 2001, chaired by Quaynor.

The organization was established in Mauritius, with plans for technical operations in South Africa, backup and disaster recovery in Egypt, and training coordination in Ghana. ICANN gave AFRINIC provisional approval in October 2004. The registry became operational in February 2005, and ICANN gave it final recognition in April 2005. Adiel Akplogan served as the founding CEO and stayed as CEO until 2015. Barrett became CEO in 2015.

=== IPv4 exhaustion process ===
IANA delegated relatively few IPv4 address blocks to AFRINIC, but as of 2015 AFRINIC had a relatively large amount of IPv4 address space that it had not yet allocated to network operators. In April 2017, it became the last regional Internet registry to run down to its last /8 block of IPv4 addresses (/8 is CIDR notation representing about 16 million addresses), thus triggering the final phase of its IPv4 address exhaustion policy. As a result, AFRINIC implemented a "soft landing" policy for allocating the last /8 to its members. In phase 2 of the exhaustion period, which started in January 2020, members with qualifying requests are eligible for allocations of /22 blocks of IPv4 addresses (about 1,000 addresses each). Staff said that about 1 million IPv4 addresses remained available as of 2024. In 2026, staff said that 783,872 IPv4 addresses remained available, and that they had also recovered 3 million IPv4 addresses that could be reallocated.

=== Sexual harassment and bullying complaint ===
In March 2018, the head of external relations alleged that the board chair, vice chair, and head of the financial department had planned to get her fired from her position. She also alleged that the chair had sexually harassed a staff member. An independent investigation committee found evidence of one incident of harassment but not "bullying or intimidation", and it found that the chair had breached his non-disclosure agreement. The chair and vice-chair resigned from their positions. Some members criticized the investigation committee's findings and the board's handling of the allegations. In the May 2018 board election, a majority of voters chose the "none of the above" option as a protest vote.

=== Misappropriation of IP address space ===
As early as 2013, AFRINIC IP addresses were misused to forward spam. In 2016 and 2017, independent researcher Ronald Guilmette notified AFRINIC of suspicious patterns of activity related to its IPs. In March 2019, based on information from the U.S. Federal Bureau of Investigation, the Supreme Court of Mauritius ordered the organization to investigate suspicious activities related to IPv4 blocks. CEO Alan Barrett announced his resignation in April 2019 and stepped down in July 2019.

In September 2019, Guilmette and South African technology news website MyBroadband published an investigation of AFRINIC IPv4 blocks that they described as stolen or squatted, and in December 2019 they publicly accused an AFRINIC senior staff member of stealing 4.1 million IPv4 addresses over the previous several years. MyBroadband initially estimated the market value of the addresses as US$54,000,000 and revised their estimate to US$80,000,000. IPv4 addresses are a public resource, not a private asset, but companies value them because many networks and systems do not yet support the more abundant IPv6 addresses. Companies and organizations sometimes sell or lease their unused IPv4 allocations to other entities. In this case, MyBroadband accused the senior staff member of changing WHOIS registration records to reassign IPv4 address blocks from their rightful holders to companies that purchased the blocks on the grey market. Some of the legitimate owners were inactive, and many of the IP addresses were unused before they were reassigned.

Eddy Kayihura became CEO in October 2019, hired to address dysfunction and corruption in the organization. Kayihura arranged for APNIC to help AFRINIC investigate the reports of theft. APNIC found that 2.3 million AFRINIC IPv4 addresses had been misappropriated and 1.8 million had been compromised, a total of 4.1 million. Kayihura dismissed the senior staff member from the organization due to "serious professional misconduct". The organization also filed a criminal complaint with the police about the staff member.

Between January and July 2020, AFRINIC worked to reclaim IP address blocks, correct WHOIS records, and improve internal security measures. In August 2020, AFRINIC said that Afri Holdings Ltd, Netstyle A. Ltd, and Elad Cohen applied for an injunction against AFRINIC; MyBroadBand reported that Cohen was connected to misappropriated IP address space. In early 2021, Logic Web Inc initiated legal action against AFRINIC after AFRINIC reclaimed IP address space from the company.

=== Beginning of legal disputes with Cloud Innovation ===
In June 2020, AFRINIC notified Cloud Innovation Limited, a company registered in Seychelles and led by Hong Kong-based businessman Lu Heng, that the company had breached its Registration Service Agreement. The concern was unrelated to the former senior staff member and the misappropriation of IP addresses investigated in 2019. AFRINIC alleged that Cloud Innovation had broken their registration agreement in multiple ways, including by leasing IPv4 addresses to entities outside of the AFRINIC service region. Cloud Innovation's business partner, Larus Limited, a company based in Hong Kong also owned by Lu, leases IP addresses to customers such as China Telecom and China Mobile. Cloud Innovation contested the complaint on multiple grounds and said it had not broken any rules. AFRINIC responded in March 2021 with related requests, and Cloud Innovation rejected the requests.

In early July 2021, AFRINIC froze 6.2 million IP addresses it had assigned to Cloud Innovation between 2013 and 2016. Cloud Innovation sued AFRINIC to remove the restrictions on its IP address space and sought US$80,000,000 in damages for defamation. The Supreme Court of Mauritius ordered the provisional freezing of up to US$50,000,000 in AFRINIC bank accounts, in the form of an ex parte action that allowed at-own-risk garnishment by Cloud Innovation. Since AFRINIC had less than US$50,000,000 in its accounts, all of its assets were frozen. On 15 July 2021, due to a court order, AFRINIC restored Cloud Innovation's access to its IP address blocks. However, AFRINIC bank assets remained frozen until 15 October 2021, when the Mauritius High Court granted the removal of the garnishee order. Cloud Innovation filed dozens of additional lawsuits against AFRINIC, including challenges to organizational procedures and operations, with litigation that continued into 2026.

==== Lobbying ====
In addition to Cloud Innovation, Lu is associated with the Number Resource Society (NRS), a lobbying group established in 2021 that has criticized AFRINIC in online publications and videos. Lu and NRS have advocated for changes to the regional Internet registry system toward a market-based model permitting private ownership and unrestricted sales and leasing of IP address space. Lu has also financed Blue Tech Wave Media (BTW Media), which has published articles supporting private ownership of IP addresses, criticizing ICANN, and commenting on AFRINIC elections.

=== Dissolution of the board ===
In early June 2022, AFRINIC's annual board election process involved several disputes and lawsuits, resulting in almost half the board seats becoming vacant and staying vacant. Cloud Innovation and Crystal Web, a former Internet service provider in South Africa that leases out IP address space through one of Lu's companies, filed lawsuits that blocked procedural aspects of the election process. On 30 June 2022, the Supreme Court of Mauritius ruled that AFRINIC's board of directors was invalid because the CEO had continued to run AFRINIC without a quorum.

In July 2022, the Number Resource Organization (an organization of the five regional Internet registries, affiliated with ICANN) sent a letter to the Mauritius government that described Cloud Innovation's 25 lawsuits against AFRINIC as "an attempt to cause irreparable harm to the core functions of AFRINIC". The organization said "it would be very unfortunate for the African regional community if the above situation proves that the designation of Mauritius as the place to locate AFRINIC has been wrong", and asked the government to recognize AFRINIC as an international organization. The chair of the RIPE Address Policy Working Group and a former AFRINIC board member criticized the letter, including for not supporting Mauritian self-governance.

AFRINIC requested the Supreme Court of Mauritius to dismiss Cloud Innovation's lawsuits as vexatious litigation, but in August 2022, the court ruled against the dismissal and allowed the lawsuits to continue. The judge concluded that the lawsuits were caused by the registry's "determination... to terminate (the plaintiff's) membership" and did not find evidence that the lawsuits were vexatious.

The CEO's contract expired in November 2022 and could not be renewed due to the lack of a complete board. Without a CEO or board, the staff continued to conduct basic operations, but the organization came close to not being able to pay staff. John Curran, CEO of the American Registry for Internet Numbers, said AFRINIC's lack of formal leadership also made it difficult for the staff to respond to lawsuits. Since the remaining elected directors did not have a quorum to hold new elections, their three-year terms eventually expired. In April 2025, some companies said their applications for address allocations were not getting processed in a timely manner.

Prompted by AFRINIC's problems and risks, between 2023 and 2025 the Number Resource Organization revisited the criteria and guidance for regional Internet registries. They requested public input for Internet Coordination Policy 2 (ICP-2), including to establish processes for de-registering and reforming a regional Internet registry if it cannot function.

=== Controversies and defamation cases ===
In February 2023, Lu and five additional people endorsed by the Number Resource Society, affiliated with Lu, ran for the APNIC board on a reform platform. This made some APNIC members concerned about concentration of power and commercialization of Internet numbers, including because of previous lawsuits and lobbying related to AFRINIC. None of those candidates won. The APNIC board election had several challenges, including allegations of code of conduct violations such as threats and intimidation.

In May 2023, AFRINIC said that the Number Resource Society (NRS) had provided AFRINIC members with misleading information regarding a purported 2023 board election, and clarified that no board election was scheduled for that year. In 2024, the CEO of a member company said in a court document that a person working for Lu offered to pay him for access to his AFRINIC account to vote in future board elections.

In 2024, Lu successfully sued The Daily Telegraph for libel for an article they published about the dispute between Cloud Innovation and AFRINIC, including for claims that Lu was trying to orchestrate the collapse of the organization. In April 2025, Lu sued The Cape Independent, a website in South Africa, after it published an article that was critical of Lu and said he was trying to take control of AFRINIC. Both articles were taken down. Lu also filed defamation lawsuits against Noah Maina, Secretary General of the Tanzania Internet Service Providers Association, and Brian Longwe, an ISP founder and executive, who have spoken about AFRINIC board election processes. In July 2025, Cloud Innovation sent cease and desist letters to people who posted links to a Medium article about the conflict between Cloud Innovation and AFRINIC. American technology news website Techdirt described the company's letters as fitting the pattern of strategic lawsuits against public participation.

=== Court-appointed receivership ===
In March 2023, Cloud Innovation petitioned the Supreme Court of Mauritius to place AFRINIC into receivership. The court ruled to establish receivership in September 2023, and it appointed a receiver. The court directed the receiver to maintain the ordinary operations of the organization and conduct a board election within six months. The Number Resource Organization (affiliated with ICANN) supported the receivership as a mechanism to "restore AFRINIC to functional governance". The Internet Governance Project, affiliated with American university Georgia Tech, also supported the receivership.

A former director of AFRINIC appealed the receivership in late September 2023, which blocked the election process until the court dismissed the appeal in October 2024. Upon the dismissal of the appeal, the court ordered the receiver to conduct a board election within two months, by the end of 2024. This did not happen. In February 2025, the court appointed a new receiver.

==== Annulled board election ====
In April 2025, the receiver announced plans to hold an election in June 2025. He appointed barristers from the United Kingdom to chair a nomination committee because of concerns about "potential interferences in the election process". Industry bodies that endorsed candidates for the election included Smart Africa, the South African Network Operators Group, and the Internet Service Providers' Association of South Africa (which all endorsed a similar slate of candidates), along with the Number Resource Society.

In May 2025, MyBroadband reported that Cloud Innovation had been added to AFRINIC's company registration information alongside former board members; Lu said this was a legal technicality. In June 2025, the Tanzanian Internet Service Providers Association requested the court to delay the election due to other concerns about voting rights, but the court allowed the election to continue. During the week of online voting in June, ICANN requested the receiver and the court to address the listing of Cloud Innovation in AFRINIC's registration information, potential conflicts of interest on the nominating committee, and concerns about election integrity. The receiver said that the Mauritius Registrar of Companies had mistakenly included Cloud Innovation in the AFRINIC registration information, and that he had filed to remove the mistake. He also provided clarifications about the nomination and election process.

Near the end of in-person voting on 23 June 2025, the receiver suspended voting due to questions about the validity of some votes. Several members who tried to vote in person said they found somebody else had cast their vote without their permission, using fraudulent powers of attorney. Members also alleged fraudulent proxy votes and expressed concerns about lack of transparency for the ballot-counting process. The Mauritius Digital Promotion Agency and a Mauritius telecommunications company, Emtel, filed complaints with the Mauritius Police Force about irregularities in the election. On 26 June 2025, the receiver annulled the election and committed to conducting a new election. As of September 2026, the police were still investigating two alleged forgery cases related to the annulled election.

==== Continued governance challenges ====
On 3 July 2025, ICANN informed the receiver that ICANN could appoint an emergency replacement to AFRINIC if necessary. Separately, Cloud Innovation filed a lawsuit for the compulsory liquidation of AFRINIC: a petition to the court to dissolve the organization. ICANN sent another letter to the receiver that disagreed with Cloud Innovation's effort to dissolve AFRINIC, emphasized that IP addresses are not private assets, and recommended improvements for elections to reduce interference.

Later that month, the Prime Minister of Mauritius designated AFRINIC a "declared company", putting it under government oversight to review its governance issues. The President of Mauritius appointed a judge as an inspector to investigate and produce a report about AFRINIC's legal history and situation, including the events that led to receivership, management by receivers, and Cloud Innovation's lawsuits. Cloud Innovation applied for an injunction against the judge in August 2025, and it received an interim injunction, which paused progress on the report. The judge withdrew as inspector in August 2025. Cloud Innovation also filed legal complaints to challenge the Prime Minister's designation of AFRINIC as a declared company and the government's decision to appoint a judge as an inspector.

=== Re-establishment of board and operations ===
In September 2025, the receiver conducted a successful board election. Out of the eight directors elected, Smart Africa had endorsed seven. Under the new board, some ISPs have been granted IPv4 addresses. The board has also appointed interim management personnel and developed a budget and action plan. However, in March 2026 the board said that Cloud Innovation continued to pursue lawsuits against AFRINIC that prevented full restoration of normal operations. The ongoing litigation included Cloud Innovation's petition to dissolve AFRINIC; the Supreme Court approved ICANN's request to become a party to the suit in May 2026. ICANN's goal was to help the court understand the role of the regional Internet registry, including that "numbering resources allocated through AFRINIC are not assets of AFRINIC, and therefore cannot properly be treated as assets available for distribution in a winding-up".

== See also ==
- African Internet Governance Forum
- African Declaration on Internet Rights and Freedoms
- Internet governance
