= KICTANet =

Kenyan think tank

KICTANet Trust is a multistakeholder think tank for information and communications technology policy formulation whose work spans stakeholder engagement, capacity building, research, and policy advocacy. The network was initially designed to welcome multistakeholder participation due to the ‘perceived strength and effectiveness in joint collaborative policy advocacy activities, which would be based on pooling skills and resources,’ as opposed to wasting resources in ‘competing, overlapping advocacy’. Its operating slogan was, ‘let’s talk, though we may not agree’. Tina James, who worked with CATIA when it supported the creation of KICTANet, points out: ‘the creation of KICTANet was just the right process at the right time.'

With government and other stakeholders apparently relying on it, KICTANet therefore continued after the ICT policy was adopted, leading to ‘quite a lot of successes’ like the 2010 Kenya ICT Master Plan, as well as the regulatory approval of M-Pesa and Voice over Internet Protocol (VOIP) services in the country. It also, for instance, participated in discussions that led to the drafting and passing of the National Cybersecurity Strategy (2014) and coordinated public participation in consultations like the 2014 African Union Convention on Cybersecurity. By managing a website and mailing list with over 1000 participants from diverse stakeholder groups, it has been described as ‘the biggest convener of ICT stakeholders in Kenya’.

Over the years, KICTAnet has contributed to the development of various ICT laws in Kenya, among them the Kenya Information & Communications Act 2013, Kenya Data Protection Act 2019, Kenya Computer Misuse & Cybercrimes Act 2018, Kenya ICT Policy 2006, Kenya ICT Policy 2019, and the Kenya Data Protection Policy 2019. KICTANet's work has accelerated the uptake of ICTs in the African region and contributed to the achievement of the Sustainable Development Goals.

The Kenya Data Protection Act 2019 marked a significant step in protecting personal data in Kenya. The Act gives effect to Article 31 of the Constitution on the right to privacy and established the Office of the Data Protection Commissioner to regulate compliance and enforcement.

KICTANet has played a major advocacy role in the liberalization of the voice of the internet, and such other processes as the Freedom of Information Bills, the Independent Communications Commission of Kenya Bill, and the Media Council Bill.

KICTANet has been the convener of the Kenya IGF and the East African IGF. It was also one of the organizers of the global IGF held in Nairobi, Kenya in 2011.

== Structure ==
In 2016, KICTANet was registered as a Trust governed by a board of Trustees which includes a convenor (Chief Executive Officer), a chair, a treasurer, and a secretary. The current convenor and Chief Executive Officer is Ms Grace Githaiga.
