= Internet & Jurisdiction Policy Network =

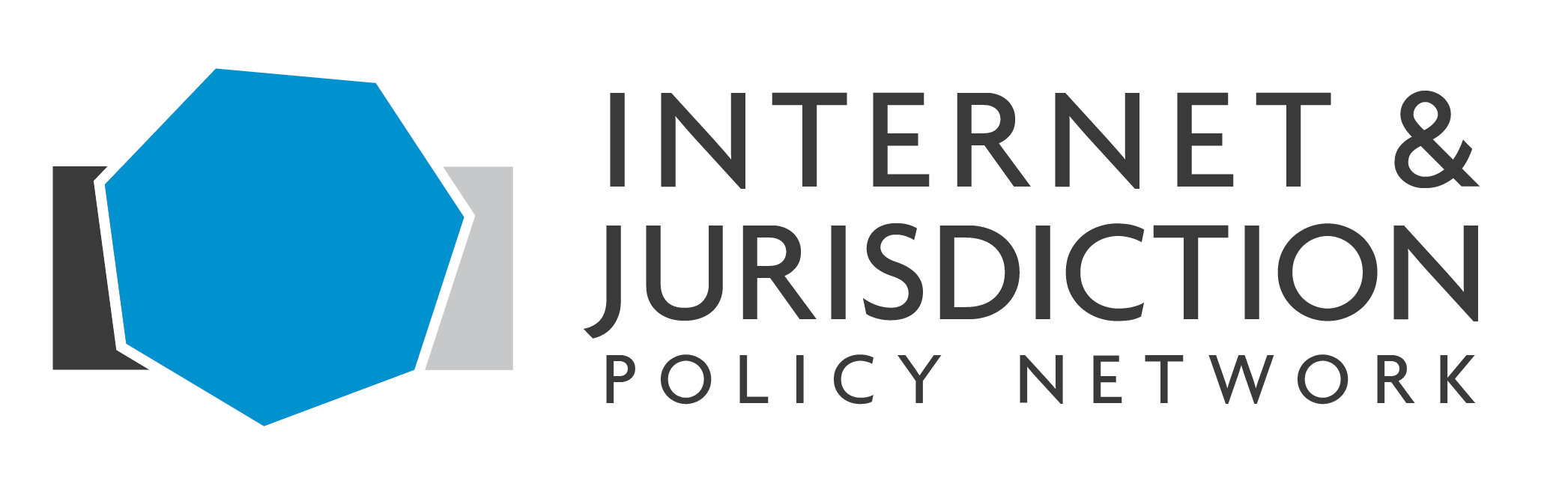
- Formation: 2012; 14 years ago
- Type: Non-profit organization
- Headquarters: Paris, France
- Website: www.internetjurisdiction.net
- Formerly called: Internet & Jurisdiction Project

The Internet & Jurisdiction Policy Network, also known as "I&J Policy Network", "Internet & Jurisdiction, or simply "I&J", is the multistakeholder organization fostering legal interoperability in cyberspace. Its Secretariat facilitates a global policy process between key stakeholders to enable transnational cooperation and policy coherence. Participants in the Policy Network work together to preserve the cross-border nature of the Internet, protect human rights, fight abuses, and enable the global digital economy. Since 2012, the Internet & Jurisdiction Policy Network has engaged more than 300 key entities from different stakeholder groups around the world, including governments, the world's largest Internet companies, the technical community, civil society groups, leading universities and international organizations.

The Secretariat of the Internet & Jurisdiction Policy Network is based in Paris, France. It was founded in 2012 by Executive Director Bertrand de La Chapelle and Deputy Executive Director Paul Fehlinger.

== Enabling multistakeholder cooperation ==
The Internet & Jurisdiction Policy Network bridges relevant stakeholder groups and policy silos in order to enable transnational cooperation. It strives to fill the institutional gap in Internet governance at the intersection of digital economy, human rights, and cybersecurity. Through global, regional, and thematic meetings, its Secretariat facilitates a neutral dialogue process with the mission of building trust among the different actors and help them develop the operational solutions necessary for the coexistence of diverse laws on the cross-border Internet.

The Internet & Jurisdiction Secretariat reports every year on progress at the Internet Governance Forum (IGF) organized by the United Nations. At the IGF 2016, The Internet & Jurisdiction Policy Network was granted for the first time an "Open Forum", a format traditionally reserved to treaty-based organizations. In June 2016 at the OECD Ministerial Meeting on the Digital Economy in Cancún, Mexico, the Background Report Economic and Social Benefits of Internet Openness, cited the Internet & Jurisdiction Policy Network's multistakeholder process as being exemplary: "The [Principles for Internet Policy Making of the 2011 OECD Council Recommendation] endorse the development of voluntary codes of conduct through multi-stakeholder processes, such as the Internet & Jurisdiction [Policy Network]." In April 2018, the G7 Cyber Group expressed its support for the ongoing work of the Internet & Jurisdiction Policy Network. The organization was selected as one of 40 worldwide initiatives to be showcased with a dedicated session to the inaugural Paris Peace Forum on November 11–13, 2018, which was attended by over 70 heads of state. The United Nations Secretary General Report on "Progress made in the implementation of and follow-up to the outcomes of the World Summit on the Information Society" referenced the work of the Internet & Jurisdiction Policy Network and its 1st and 2nd Global Conferences in 2017 and 2019. In 2020, the Internet & Jurisdiction Policy Network was referenced by the Report of the UN Secretary-General's High-level Panel on Digital Cooperation, in the Chapter on Mechanisms for Global Digital Cooperation. The Global Conferences of the Internet & Jurisdiction Policy Network are institutionally supported by six international organizations: Council of Europe, European Commission, ICANN, OECD, UN ECLAC, and UNESCO. In 2018, the I&J Secretariat signed its first formal Memorandum of Understanding with an international organization, the United Nations ECLAC.

== Programs of the Internet & Jurisdiction Policy Network ==
The Internet & Jurisdiction Policy Network's Programs foster policy coherence and develop concrete policy standards and operational solutions. Over 100 key stakeholders from all five continents are Members of their multistakeholder Contact Groups. Outcomes of the Programs include operational norms, criteria and mechanisms, which are jointly developed by their Members.

- Data & Jurisdiction Program: How can transnational data flows and the protection of privacy be reconciled with lawful access requirements to address crime?
- Content & Jurisdiction Program: How can we manage globally available content in light of the diversity of local laws and norms applicable on the internet?
- Domains & Jurisdiction Program: How can the neutrality of the internet's technical layer be preserved when national laws are applied on the Domain Name System?

== Global Conferences of the Internet & Jurisdiction Policy Network ==
The Global Conferences of the Internet & Jurisdiction Policy Network are milestone meetings in which stakeholders take stock of the intersessional work and decide on common objectives and next steps for the policy development work. Stakeholder Plenary Sessions are held in the innovative heptagon seating format invented by the Secretariat of the Policy Network. They are organized in partnership with a host government, which were in the past France (2016), Canada (2018) and Germany (2019).

=== 1st Global Conference of the Internet & Jurisdiction Policy Network in Paris ===
The 1st Global Conference of the Internet & Jurisdiction Policy Network took place on November 14–16, 2016 in Paris, France. It was organized in partnership with the Government of France and institutionally supported by the OECD, the European Commission, UNESCO, the Council of Europe, the Slovak Presidency of the Council of the European Union, and ICANN. The French Ministry of Foreign Affairs provided its Ministerial Conference Center as the venue. It was the first time that more than 200 senior representatives from more than 40 countries from states, Internet companies, technical operators, civil society, academia and international organizations gathered to specifically address the issue of jurisdiction on the Internet. As The Economist reported: "If nothing is done, many who met [at the Global Conference of the Internet & Jurisdiction Policy Network] in Paris worried, the open internet could be a thing of the past within a decade or two. What is needed, they said, is more international co-operation—but not of the old kind." As an outcome, stakeholders identified concrete "areas for cooperation" to help the development of shared policy standards and frameworks for legal interoperability and due process across borders. The Global Internet and Jurisdiction Conference firmly placed the topic of jurisdiction on the Internet governance agenda, as recommended in the 2014 NETmundial Roadmap for the Future Evolution of Internet Governance Ecosystem. The 1st Global Conference of the Internet & Jurisdiction Policy Network was recognized by the 2017 United Nations Secretary-General's Report "Progress Made in the Implementation of and Follow-up to the Outcomes of the World Summit on the Information Society", and the I&J Secretariat was invited to present outcomes to the G7 Cyber Group in March 2017 and the G20 Multistakeholder Conference on the Digital Future in April 2017.

=== 2nd Global Conference of the Internet & Jurisdiction Policy Network in Ottawa ===
The 2nd Global Conference of the Internet & Jurisdiction Policy Network took place on February 26–28, 2018 in Ottawa, Canada. It was organized in partnership with the Government of Canada and institutionally supported by the OECD, the European Commission, UNESCO, the Council of Europe, and ICANN. Three multistakeholder Contact Groups were formed as an outcome of the first Global Conference in Paris for each of the three Programs of the Policy Network. They elaborated in 2017 so-called "Policy Options Documents". Based on these, the over 200 senior-level stakeholder from more than 40 countries defined common objectives to develop concrete solutions to pressing jurisdictional challenges on the internet and adopted the Ottawa Roadmap. The Ottawa Roadmap established for the first time agreed Work Plans with structuring components for each Program of the Policy Network to advance towards policy coherence and joint action. Ahead of the 2nd Global Conference, co-founder of the internet Vint Cerf called in a Financial Times Op-Ed upon stakeholders that "the future of the cross-border internet depends on [its outcomes]". Politico asked "The internet is broken. Can this group fix it?". In April 2018, the Group of Seven (G7) Cyber Group expressed its support for the "continued multi-stakeholder work under the auspices of the Internet and Jurisdiction Policy Network, including most recently the Ottawa Road Map that came out of the 2nd Global Conference on Internet and Jurisdiction held in Ottawa in February 2018". To implement the Ottawa Roadmap, 120 representatives from five continents, composed of Members from governments, companies, civil society and international organizations, work together in three Contact Groups (Data & Jurisdiction, Content & Jurisdiction, Domains & Jurisdiction) to develop proposals for policy standards and operational solutions.

=== 3rd Global Conference of the Internet & Jurisdiction Policy Network in Berlin ===
The 3rd Global Conference of the Internet & Jurisdiction Policy Network took place on June 3–5, 2019 in Berlin, Germany. It gathered almost 300 senior level key stakeholders from more than 50 countries around the world. The Conference was organized in partnership with the Government of Germany, and institutionally supported by the Council of Europe, European Commission, ICANN, OECD, UN ECLAC, and UNESCO. The Conference discussed the operational Norms, Criteria and Mechanisms, developed in each Program of the Internet & Jurisdiction Policy Network, to address some of the most pressing cross-border legal challenges of the digital 21st century, and resulted in the Berlin Roadmap to structure the further work on outcomes.

== I&J Global and Regional Status Reports ==
I&J Status Reports survey key stakeholders to track global and regional trends, actors and solutions. They help foster policy coherence and legal interoperability in cyberspace. The Secretariat of the Internet & Jurisdiction Policy Network launched the world's first Internet & Jurisdiction Global Status Report at the United Nations Internet Governance Forum on November 27, 2019, during a Special Session. It presents a first-of-its-kind mapping of internet jurisdiction related policy trends, actors and initiatives. The Report combines detailed desk research with a global data collection from over 150 key stakeholders – states, internet companies, technical operators, civil society, academia and international organizations from five continents. In 2020, the Internet & Jurisdiction Policy Network launches the first regional Status Report for Latin America and the Caribbean in partnership with United Nations ECLAC.

== I&J Retrospect Database ==
To enable evidence-based policy innovation, Internet & Jurisdiction created in 2012 the open access, indexed and searchable I&J Retrospect Database. By 2020, it contains almost 2000 cases from more than 120 countries that document the tensions between the cross-border Internet and national jurisdictions. It is a leading resource that allows stakeholders to better understand global trends.
