= Maxence Melo Mubyazi =

Tanzanian journalist (born 1976)

- Born: 1976 (age 49–50); Kantare, Kagera Region, Tanzania
- Education: Dar es Salaam Institute of Technology
- Occupation: Journalist
- Organization: JamiiForums
- Criminal charges: Obstruction of a police investigation
- Criminal penalty: 3 million TSH fine

Maxence Melo Mubyazi (born May 1976) is a Tanzanian journalist known for co-founding the online news outlet and forum JamiiForums. In 2019, he won the CPJ International Press Freedom Award for his activism calling for accountability and transparency in Tanzania.

== Biography ==
Melo was born in Kantare, a village in Kagera Region. He went on to obtain a technician certificate and a bachelor's degree from the Dar es Salaam Institute of Technology. He is known for his advocacy for freedom of expression and internet governance.

In 2006, Melo co-founded alongside Mike Mushi the social media website JamiiForums, which emphasised user-generated content to avoid penalties faced by traditional media for reporting on social, political and economic issues in Tanzania. JamiiForums provided breaking news coverage, and also served as a secure whisteblowing platform in which users could anonymously report on corruption. The website, which operates primarily in Swahili, became well-known for exposing corruption in Tanzania, including reporting on the Richmond scandal in 2008 which led to the resignation of the Prime Minister of Tanzania, Edward Lowassa, and the dissolution of his cabinet; and the Tegeta escrow scandal in 2014, which saw the President of Tanzania Jakaya Kikwete sack several of his ministers, including Anna Tibaijuka, the Minister of Lands, Housing and Human Development. The website has become popular in East and Central Africa. Tanzanian authorities have accused the site of letting users post "fabrications and seditious content", a claim Melo has denied.

Melo was also the founder of the news portal Fikra Pevu.

== Criminal charges ==
In 2009, Melo was detained on allegations of terrorism by the presidential office. No charges were ultimately filed against him.

On 13 December 2016, JamiiForum's offices in Mikocheni were raided by Tanzanian security forces, who arrested and interrogated Melo for 48 hours before detaining him at a prison in Keko; Melo's lawyer later stated the police did this without warrants. On 16 December, he was charged with "obstruction of a police investigation", "not complying with an order of disclosure of data" and "managing a domain not registered in Tanzania", under the 2015 Cybercrimes Act and the 2010 Electronic and Postal Communications Act. Melo was granted bail on 19 December, pending trial, including being unable to leave Dar es Salaam without permission. Tanzanian authorities had demanded the identities of JamiiForum users, specifically on forum posts commenting on alleged "corruption deals" between May 2015 and December 2016. Melo refused to disclose the information, stating that doing so would counter digital privacy and confidentiality laws, and specifically article 18 of the Tanzanian constitution, which guaranteed the right to privacy.

In 2017, Melo appeared in court on 81 occasions.

On 1 June 2018, Melo was acquitted of the charge of "not compyling with an order of disclosure of date" by the Kisutu Court in Dar es Salaam, in relation to his 2016 arrest. Later that month, JamiiForums was temporarily shut down after the government enacted the Electronic and Postal Communications Act's online content regulations, which required bloggers and online forums to pay a 900 USD registration fee to operate online. Melo refused to pay the fee, stating that complying with the law would betray the anonymity guaranteed to JamiiForum users. As a result, Melo had to shut down Fikra Pevu, though JamiiForums eventually reopened.

On 8 April 2020, Melo was convicted by the Resident Magistrates Court of Dar es Saalm with "obstruction of a police investigation", following his 2016 arrest. He was given the choice of one year in prison or a fine of three million TSH; Melo paid the fine and stated his intention to appeal the ruling before the High Court of Tanzania. The Committee to Project Journalists has called on Tanzanian authorities to cease its harassment of Melo and Jamii Forums. The Observatory for the Protection of Human Rights Defenders expressed its concern over the judicial harassment of Melo and called on Tanzanian authorities to end all harassment against Melo and all human rights activists in Tanzania.

== Recognition ==
In 2019, Melo was named as one of the laureates of that year's International Press Freedom Prize from the Committee to Project Journalists. He won the award in recognition of him improving accountability and transparency in Tanzania. He was the first Tanzanian to win the award. During Melo's acceptance speech, he criticised the trend of sub-Saharan African countries using overly broad cybercrime laws to attack freedom of speech.
