= JamiiForums =

Tanzania-based social networking website

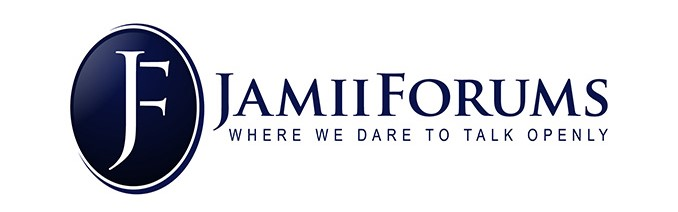
- Company type: Social Media
- Website type: forums
- Available in: Swahili, English
- Founded: 2016
- Headquarters: House no. 8, Avocado Street, Kawe, Dar es Salaam, Tanzania, Tanzania
- Area served: Mikocheni
- Owner: Vapper Tech Ltd
- Key people: Maxence Melo (CEO and co-founder). Mike Mushi (co-founder)
- Services: Web communications
- Website: www.jamiiforums.com
- Advertising: Yes
- Registration: Optional
- Launched: 2006; 20 years ago
- Current status: Active

JamiiForums is a Tanzania-based social networking website in East Africa founded in 2006. The online network is notable as the most popular social media website in Tanzania, according to AllAfrica. The website emphasizes its use of user-generated content to avoid penalties faced by traditional media for reporting issues in Tanzania. According to Washington Post, recent Tanzanian bills have caused significant worry over potential media crackdown in Tanzania, though its founders faced several law charges over the years.

JamiiForums was officially launched in March 2006 with the name JamboForums, and comprised several online subforums. In May 2008 they changed their name to JamiiForums due to copyright issues. In March 2016, Jamii Media filed a lawsuit against the federal Tanzanian police force, alleging that the police force's power to demand personal information of individuals suspected of crimes was unconstitutional. The case will be processed through the High Court of Tanzania.

== Controversy ==
According to The Daily Beast and The Guardian, the website became a whistle blowing platform with its focus on current events and news, placing the website at direct opposition with the leading Tanzanian political party Chama Cha Mapinduzi. Tom Rhodes, a member of the committee to Protect Journalists in East Africa, notes that the website is notable for its function as a "cathartic tool where even disgruntled politicians go and upload sensitive documents" in the Irish Times.

Due to its use was a whistle blowing platform, BBC News characterized the website as an East African version of Wikileaks.

Beyond user-generated content, the founders of the website have advocated for freedom of media and social networking in Tanzania. The director of the website spoke out against recently passed Tanzanian laws that purportedly give too much power to the Tanzanian National Bureau of Statistics.

From June 11, 2018, JamiiForums service was shut down and the platform was temporarily not available online due to failure of its owners to comply with government requirements of exposing users information and delaying paying registration fees as due to announcement made by Tanzania Regulatory Authority (TCRA) but 21days later it was back into operation.
