= Fundación Ciudadano Inteligente =

Fundación Ciudadanía Inteligente
- Established: December 2009
- Address: 895 Holanda; Providencia, Santiago, Chile
- Location: Santiago, Chile
- Website: ciudadaniai.org

Fundación Ciudadanía Inteligente (Smart Citizen Foundation) is a non-profit organization based in Santiago, Chile. The organization creates web technologies as a key tool for gathering, organizing, illustrating and sharing information through the web, working to promote informed citizen actions and government accountability. Under the umbrella of Fundación Ciudadanía Inteligente, there are several ongoing projects. The web platform, Vota Inteligente (Vote Smartly), hosts different applications and tools that give access to information for the general public.

== History ==
Fundación Ciudadanía Inteligente was registered as a non-governmental organization in Chile on December 22, 2009. Fundación Ciudadano Inteligente is the current Fundación Ciudadanía Inteligente ( was started on December 28, 2009, by its Founding Directors; Felipe Heusser, Erich Schnake, Rodrigo Saffirio, Rodrigo Mobarec, Sebastian Echeverria, Alfonso Tapia, Juan Covarrubias, Pablo Carvacho, Boris De Los Rios, Valentina Insulza, and Milenko Bertrand- Galindo. Vota Inteligente was publicly launched on October 22 of that same year in preparation for the Chilean Presidential elections. The first drafts of the organization’s mission focused on the promotion of transparency and social accountability. Web technology later also became an essential element to the organization, mainly due to the influence of other organizations that had already successfully been using the internet to pursue transparency and accountability.

== Funding and finance ==
The Open Society Institute finances 90% of Fundación Ciudadanía Inteligente’s annual operations. The other 10% of finances come from grants such as those from the World Bank Institute, the Prix Ars Electronica Award, and recently, the Omidyar Network.

== Vota Inteligente ==
Vota Inteligente is the main initiative of Fundación Ciudadanía Inteligente. Through Vota Inteligente, Chilean citizens are able to access all up to date information on Congressional actions and activities in one place. The site contains information on how Congress works, including how a bill is passed, information on its structure and the current party composition of Parliamentarians.

Vota Inteligente’s main work is to track bills being debated within Congress – more specifically in the Chamber of Deputies and the Senate – providing updated information not only regarding the content of the bill itself but also presenting the bill’s development and status, dimensions of debate, support and opposition of Parliamentary members, potential conflicts of interest and investments on issues, in both plenary and committee levels of Congress.

== Other projects ==
In addition to the main project, Vota Inteligente, the following projects are ongoing within Ciudadanía Inteligente: Acceso Inteligente (Smart Access) is an online freedom of information management system for Chilean citizens, Promesas 21 de Mayo (Government Promises of May 21) is a graphic analysis and follow-up of presidential electoral promises, Señal Alo (Hi Sign) an online visualization of telecommunication antennas with a strategic design. Donar (Donate) is a tool modeled, that promotes donations to civil society organizations in Chile, making the donation process transparent and easily accessible for both Chileans and the NGOs on the site. The site, ¿Hay Acuerdo? (Is there Agreement?) breaks down the current ongoing debate between Chilean students and the Piñera administration. Globo Ciudadano (Citizen’s Balloon) is a project that live streams protests in Chile on its website, using balloon mapping.

== Awards ==
In September 2011, the organization received an international award from PrixArs Electronica, International Competition for the Arts. It was one of six winners selected out of more than 3,600 projects and 74 countries.
