= CITAD =

Nigerian non-governmental organisation

Center for Information, Technology, and Development
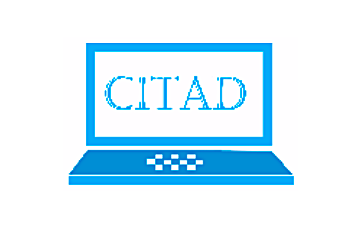

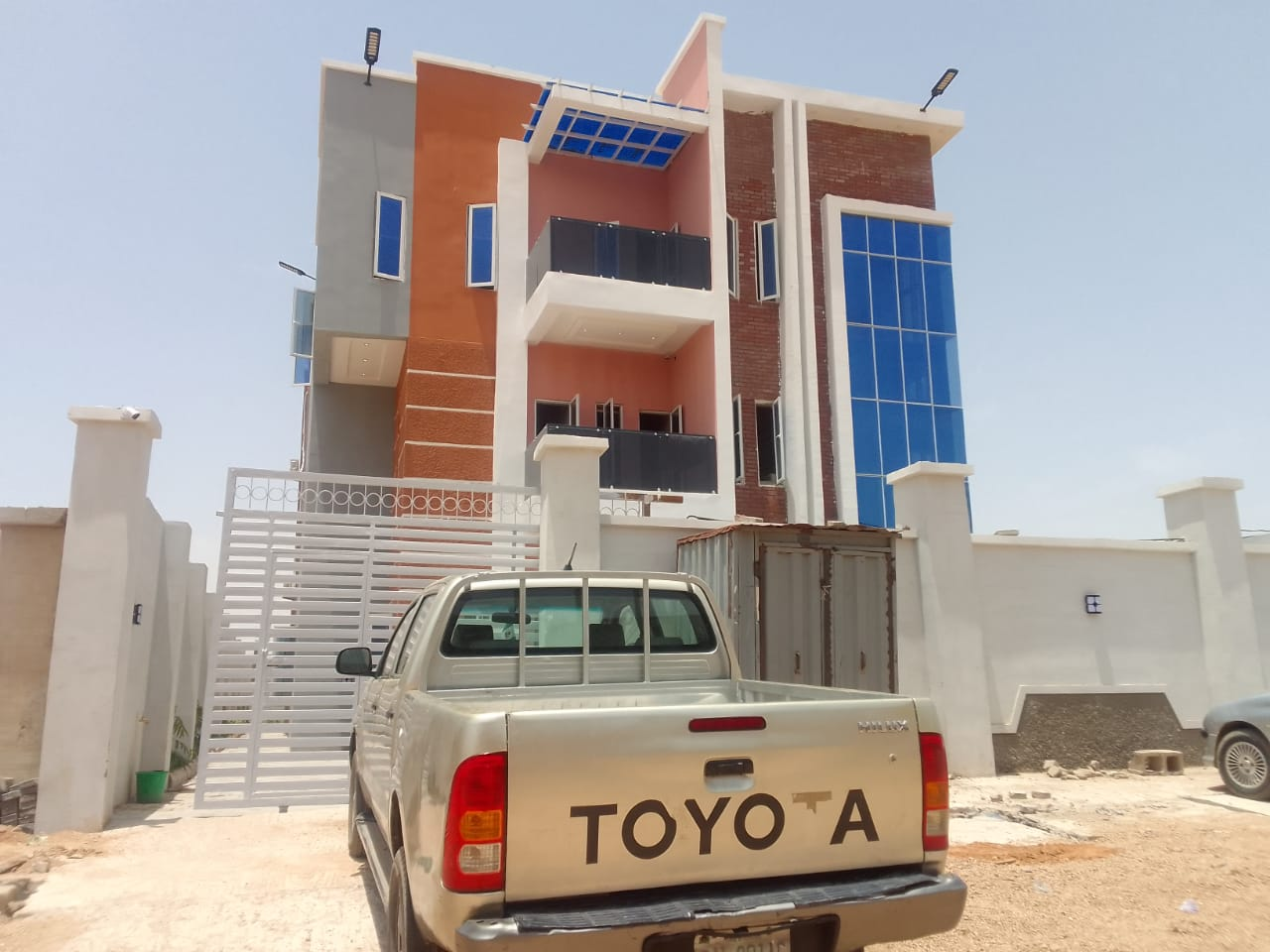
- Abbreviation: CITAD
- Formation: 1997
- Headquarters: Kano
- Location: Abuja, Jama'are, Itas, Nigeria
- Chairman: Prof. Amina Kaidal
- Executive Director: Engineer Yunusa Ya'u
- Board of directors: Prof. Amina Kaidal; Yunusa Ya'u; Ahmad A. Yakasai; Dr. (Mrs) Sadiya A. Mohammed; Engr. Nmezi; Engr. Kamaluddeen Umar; Isyaku Garba
- Website: https://www.citad.org.ng/
- Formerly called: Computer Literacy Project

The Center for Information, Technology, and Development (CITAD) is a Nigerian non-governmental organisation that was established to promote democracy and active citizenship through information and communication technology in addendum with civic empowerment programs. It has its headquarters in Kano and branches in Abuja, Jama'are, Itas, Dutse (Jigawa State), Azare, Gombe and Yobe States.

== History ==
CITAD came into existence in 1997 as the Computer Literacy Project. In 2000, the capacity was increased and it currently covers 12 different units:

1. Digital Creativity and Innovation for Young Women (DICI-YOW)
2. Gender Violence and Human Rights
3. Governance and elections
4. Capacity Building
5. Digital Inclusion
6. ICTs in Education
7. aHub
8. ICTs in Peace Building
9. JOPIS: Job Placement Information Services Job Placement Information Services (JOPIS)
10. Youth Entrepreneurship
11. Research and Knowledge Production (dialogues, series)
12. Accountability and Anti-corruption
