= United Nations University Institute on Comparative Regional Integration Studies =

Institute in Belgium

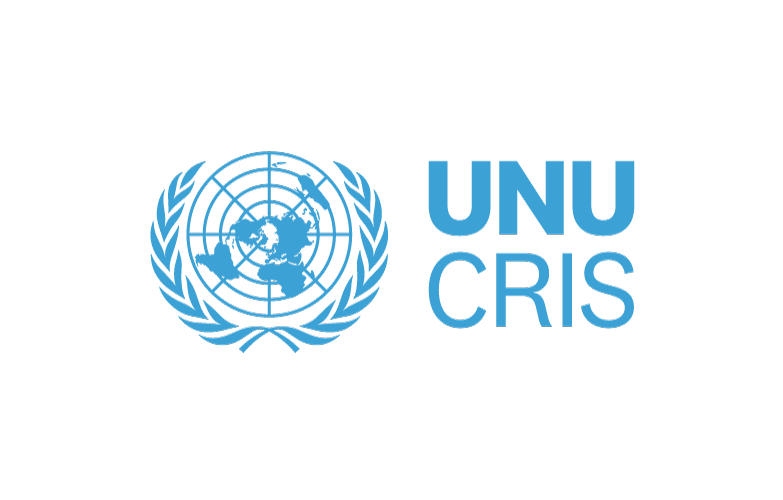
UNU-CRIS logo

The United Nations University Institute on Comparative Regional Integration Studies (UNU-CRIS) is a Research and Training Institute of the United Nations University (UNU). Based in Bruges, Belgium since 2001, UNU-CRIS specializes in the comparative study of regional integration and the provision of global and regional public goods, including environmental stability, poverty reduction, peace, and justice.

Its aim is to generate policy-relevant knowledge about new forms of regional and global governance and co-operation, and to contribute to research that addresses challenges to global and regional governance.

== Funding ==
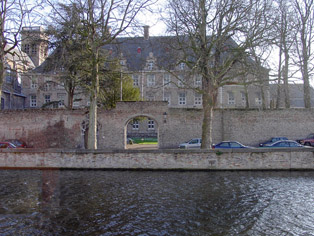
UNU-CRIS premises

UNU–CRIS’ core funding is provided by the Flemish Government of the Kingdom of Belgium. With the support of the province of West Flanders, it is located at the Episcopal Seminary, the former Abbey of the Dunes of Bruges. On 9 February 2017, UNU-CRIS organized an academic session to announce the first Memorandum of Understanding between the United Nations University, Ghent University, the Vrije Universiteit Brussel and the Flemish Government. The academic session took place in the Gothic Hall of the City Hall of Bruges. The Under-Secretary-General of the UN and UNU Rector David Malone came to Bruges to celebrate this special event and to present his vision on the changing role for UNU and UNU-CRIS.

== Structure ==
UNU–CRIS is bound to the guidelines of UNU, set out by the UNU Council. It is led by its Director and Associate Director, responsible for the research and management of the institute and the implementation of the guidelines provided by the Scientific Advisory Committee. The Scientific Advisory Committee consists of internationally renowned scientists and convenes on a yearly basis to evaluate past performance and consults on future developments and strategies. Research is undertaken by resident academics in Bruges and a number of non-resident Associate Researchers located at institutions around the globe. Besides that, the Institute hosts visiting researchers and trainees at a regular basis.

== Mission ==
UNU-CRIS focuses on new patterns of regional and global cooperation and governance. Through its research activities, it will connect scholarly knowledge with policy-making, aiming to contribute to the creation and maintenance of peace and stability.

The Institute will generate policy-relevant knowledge about new forms of governance and cooperation on the regional and global level, about patterns of collective action and decision-making, benefiting from the experience of European integration and the role of the EU as a regional actor in the global community.

UNU-CRIS focuses on issues of immediate concern to the United Nations, such as the 2030 Development Agenda and the challenges arising from new and evolving peace, security, economic and environmental developments regionally and globally. On these issues, the Institute will develop solutions based on research on new patterns of collective action and regional governance.

The Institute endeavors to pair academic excellence with policy-relevant research in these domains.

In addition, the mission of UNU-CRIS is to contribute towards achieving the universal goals of the UN and UNU through comparative and interdisciplinary research and training for better understanding of the processes and impact of intra- and inter-regional integration.

The work of UNU-CRIS focuses upon:

- Visioning how multi-level governance is being shaped
- Monitoring the implementation and impact of regional integration
- Deepening the critical understanding of regional integration as a process of social transformation and of the relations between micro- and macro-regionalisms
- Strengthening the governance capacities at local, national, regional and global levels for dealing with regional integration
- Assessing the actual and potential role of regions in the UN system.

== Research ==
The research activities aim at realizing the guidelines set out by its mission and strategies advised by the Scientific Advisory Committee. It is organized in four clusters:

=== The Role of Regions in Global Governance ===
The emergence of new regional actors has led to new forms of governance with foreseeable consequences regarding global governance. With its research programme, UNU-CRIS aims to develop a better understanding of the different existing models of governance. The program has one ongoing research project: GR:EEN.

=== Monitoring Regionalization Processes ===
All over the world, we are witnessing processes of regionalization taking the form of cooperative arrangements or integration schemes. Groups of states initiate and support regionalization processes, inter alia, to improve their political links, to reap the gains from expanded trade in goods and services, to strengthen financial links, to benefit from risk-sharing and better investment opportunities, and to secure their regional environment.

This research program aims to monitor regionalization processes worldwide and to collect quantitative data and qualitative information. To this end, it seeks to advance new monitoring and assessment methods and to develop appropriate tools for retrospective measurements and prospective foresight of regional integration processes. The program also supports the monitoring efforts of specific regional organizations. There are currently two ongoing projects.

==== RIKS ====
The Regional Integration Knowledge System (RIKS) was developed in the framework of the GARNET Network of Excellence as a joint initiative undertaken by UNU-CRIS and various partner institutes and organizations. Its objective is to provide a central node for information exchange on regional integration processes worldwide and to constitute a ‘missing link’ between existing regional initiatives for information provision on regional integration and cooperation.

Since 2010, RIKS has been turned into a [www.cris.unu.edu/RIKS/web/ web-based platform] creating a confluence point where qualitative and quantitative information on various aspects of regional integration processes can be retrieved and exchanged.

==== The World Report on Regional Integration and Governance ====
The World Reports on Regional Integration are published by UNU-CRIS in collaboration with UN-ESCWA, UN-ESCAP, UN-ECLAC, UN-ECA, UN-ECE and UNCTAD with a view to pooling the expertise built up by the various UN regional economic and social commissions in their respective regions. The World Reports contain regional reports, combined with thematic contributions and a statistical section that presents supra-regional trends in terms of socio-economic governance across the globe. The reports also comprise theoretical, methodological and empirical contributions from academics and policy makers worldwide.

=== The UN and Regional Public Goods ===
Regions were part of the UN from its inception. In their different forms, they are present in the UN Charter and in the development of the UN structures and agencies. Linkages between supranational regions and the UN are numerous and of variable intensity; there are still many unresolved political, institutional and operational challenges to confront.

UNU-CRIS is currently engaged in three research projects that are part of this program.

==== GRESI FWO ====
“Globalization, Regionalization and Socio-Economic Inequality”–(GRESI) is a scientific research community supported by the Flemish Fund for Scientific Research (FWO).

The research priorities are: the quantitative analysis of globalization and regionalization processes; globalization, labor market and income inequality; South-South migration; and inequality in global governance.

This network is coordinated by the University of Antwerp and the University of Ghent. The consortium includes UNU-CRIS, the University of Leuven, the University of Lille, and UNU-MERIT/University of Maastricht.

==== UNESCO-UNU Chair ====
The UNESCO-UNU Chair in Regional Integration, Migration and Free Movement of People was established by UNESCO and UNU-CRIS in late 2010. Based in Bruges with the financial support of the Flemish Government, it collaborates closely with the University of Pretoria.

The objective of the UNESCO-UNU Chair is to address the opportunities and challenges of regional integration, the social dimension of regional integration, and the various aspects of migration, in particular the free movement of people within South Africa and the Southern African region.

The UNESCO-UNU Chair serves as a think tank and bridge-builder, sharing its expertise to contribute to research, training and capacity building with the aim of making free movement of people tangible in the Southern African region.

==== PRARI ====
The international research project on ‘Poverty Reduction and Regional Integration: A Comparative Analysis of SADC and UNASUR Health Policies’ (PRARI) firstly aims to establish what methods of regional policy formation in relation to the Southern African Development Community and the Union of South American Nations are conducive to the formulation of embedded pro-poor health strategies. Second, it investigates how these strategies can be promoted.

The project is funded by the UK Economic and Social Research Council in collaboration with the UK Department for International Development and is led by Professor Nicola Yeates (Open University, UK). Further project partners include: UNU-CRIS, the University of Southampton, the South African Institute of International Affairs, and the Latin American Social Sciences Institute.

=== Education, Capacity Building and Development Activities ===
==== Master Program ====
At the Maastricht Graduate School of Governance in the Netherlands, UNU-CRIS and the United Nations University – Maastricht Economic and Social Research Centre on Innovation and Technology offer the students studying for a master's degree in Science in Public Policy and Human Development a specialization on Regional Integration and Multi-Level Governance.

==== Doctoral Program ====
The Erasmus Mundus Joint Doctorate on “Globalization, the EU, and Multilateralism” is a five-year program aimed at fostering first-rate interdisciplinary doctoral research in Europe on common policy and societal challenges facing the current global system. The stewardship of the doctoral program is in the hands of the European Studies Institute at the Free University of Brussels. In total, the GEM Ph.D. School brings together a unique set of nine leading research institutions from across the globe, such as the European Institute at the University of Geneva, PAIS at the University of Warwick and IAPS at Waseda University in Tokyo. Being one of the three associate institutions, UNU-CRIS offers students at the GEM Ph.D. School a short stay in their third year with an eye on furthering their research.

==== Summer School ====
The Universidad Andina Simón Bolívar and UNU-CRIS co-organize an annual Doctoral Summer School entitled “Latin American, European and Comparative Regionalism” in Quito, Ecuador. The Doctoral School lasts one week and is bi-lingual (English and Spanish). The aim is to create a network of Ph.D. and other young researchers dealing with regionalism from all over the Latin American continent and beyond.
