= Ana Pešić =

Serbian politician

Ana Pešić (Serbian Cyrillic: Ана Пешић; born 1987) is a politician in Serbia. She has served in the National Assembly of Serbia since 2020 as a member of the Serbian Progressive Party.

== Private career ==
Pešić was born in Ćićevac, in what was then the Socialist Republic of Serbia in the Socialist Federal Republic of Yugoslavia. She has a degree in philology, focusing on English language and literature.

== Politician ==
=== Municipal politics ===
Pešić received the fifth position on the Progressive Party's electoral list for the Ćićevac municipal assembly in the 2016 Serbian local elections and was elected when the list won eight out of twenty-five mandates. This election was won by a local political alliance, and the Progressives served in opposition. She was promoted to the fourth position on the party's list in the 2020 local elections and was re-elected when the list won a plurality victory with eleven mandates.

=== Member of the National Assembly ===
Pešić received the 140th position on the Progressive Party's Aleksandar Vučić — For Our Children list in the 2020 Serbian parliamentary election and was elected when the list won a landslide majority with 188 out of 250 mandates. She is now a member of the assembly's European integration committee; a deputy member of the foreign affairs committee and the committee on education, science, technological development, and the information society; the leader of Serbia's parliamentary friendship group with Sierra Leone; and a member of the parliamentary friendship groups with China, Germany, Greece, Japan, Malta, Norway, Russia, Sweden, Switzerland, Turkey, the United Arab Emirates, and the United States of America.
