= Internet Governance Forum =

International governance group

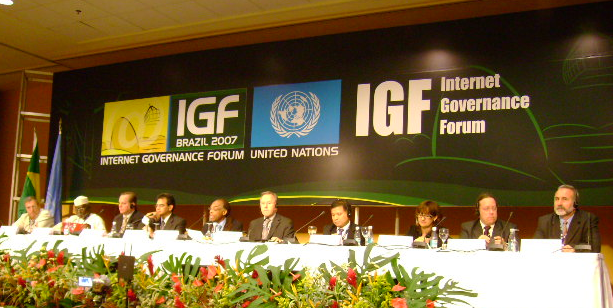
Internet Governance Forum, Rio de Janeiro 2007

The Internet Governance Forum (IGF) is a multistakeholder governance group for policy dialogue on issues of Internet governance. It brings together all stakeholders in the Internet governance debate, whether they represent governments, the private sector or civil society, including the technical and academic community, on an equal basis and through an open and inclusive process. The establishment of the IGF was formally announced by the United Nations secretary-general in July 2006. It was first convened in October–November 2006 and has held an annual meeting since then.

== History and development ==
=== WSIS phase I, WGIG, and WSIS phase II ===
The first phase of World Summit on the Information Society (WSIS), held in Geneva in December 2003, failed to agree on the future of Internet governance, but did agree to continue the dialogue and requested the United Nations Secretary-General to establish a multi-stakeholder Working Group on Internet Governance (WGIG).

Following a series of open consultations in 2004 and 2005 and after reaching a clear consensus among its members the WGIG proposed the creation of the IGF as one of four proposals made in its final report. The WGIG report was one of the inputs to the second phase of the World Summit on the Information Society held in Tunis in 2005. The idea of the Forum was also proposed by Argentina, as stated in its proposal made during the last Prepcom 3 in Tunis.

The second phase of WSIS, held in Tunis in November 2005, formally called for the creation of the IGF and set out its mandate. Paragraph 72 of the Tunis Agenda called on the UN Secretary-General to convene a meeting with regards to the new multi-stakeholder forum to be known as the IGF. The Tunis WSIS meeting did not reach an agreement on any of the other WGIG proposals that generally focused on new oversight functions for the Internet that would reduce or eliminate the special role that the United States plays with respect to Internet governance through its contractual oversight of ICANN. The US Government's position during the lead-up to the Tunis WSIS meeting was flexible on the principle of global involvement, very strong on the principle of multi-stakeholder participation, but inflexible on the need for US control to remain for the foreseeable future in order to ensure the "security and stability of the Internet".

=== 2005 mandate ===
The mandate for the IGF is contained in the 2005 WSIS Tunis Agenda. The IGF was mandated to be principally a discussion forum for facilitating dialogue between the Forum's participants. The IGF may "identify emerging issues, bring them to the attention of the relevant bodies and the general public, and, where appropriate, make recommendations," but does not have any direct decision-making authority. In this mandate, different stakeholders are encouraged to strengthen engagement, particularly those from developing countries. In paragraph 72(h), the mandate focused on capacity-building for developing countries and the drawing out of local resources. This particular effort, for instance, has been reinforced through DiploFoundation's Internet Governance Capacity Building Programme (IGCBP) that allowed participants from different regions to benefit from valuable resources with the help of regional experts in Internet governance.

=== Formation ===
The United Nations published its endorsement of a five-year mandate for the IGF in April 2006. There were two rounds of consultations with regards to the convening of the first IGF, in February and May 2006. The convening of the IGF was announced on 18 July 2006, with the inaugural meeting of the forum held in Athens, Greece from 30 October to 2 November 2006.

=== 2011 mandate renewal and improvements process ===
In the lead-up to the completion of the first five-year mandate of the IGF in 2010, the UN initiated a process of evaluating the continuation of the IGF, resulting in a United Nations General Assembly resolution to continue the IGF for a further five years (2011–2015). In addition to the renewed mandate, another UN body, the Commission on Science and Technology for Development (CSTD), established a Working Group on Improvements to the IGF (CSTDWG), which issued a report to the commission for consideration during its 15th session held 21–25 May 2012, in Geneva. The Working Group report made recommendations with regard to shaping of the outcomes of IGF meetings, working modalities, funding, broadening participation and capacity-building, and linking the IGF to other Internet governance-related entities.

At its meeting held from 21 to 25 May 2012 the CSTD made recommendations to the Economic and Social Council regarding Internet governance and the Internet Governance Forum, which the Council accepted at its meeting on 24 July 2012. The recommendations included urging the Secretary-General to ensure the continued functioning of the IGF and its structures in preparation for the seventh meeting of the Internet Governance Forum, to be held from 6 to 9 November 2012 in Baku, Azerbaijan and future meetings of the Internet Governance Forum.

=== 2015 mandate renewal ===
The second five-year mandate of the IGF ended in 2015. On 16 December 2015 the United Nations General Assembly adopted the outcome document on the 10-year review of the implementation of the outcomes of the World Summit on the Information Society. Among other things the outcome document urges the need to promote greater participation and engagement in Internet governance discussions that should involve governments, the private sector, civil society, international organizations, the technical and academic communities, and all other relevant stakeholders. It acknowledges the role the Internet Governance Forum (IGF) has played as a multistakeholder platform for discussion of Internet governance issues. And it extends the existing mandate of the IGF as set out in paragraphs 72 to 78 of the Tunis Agenda for a third period of ten years. During the ten-year period, the IGF should continue to show progress on working modalities, and participation of relevant stakeholders from developing countries.

=== IGF Retreat, July 2016 ===
After the UN General Assembly extended the IGF's mandate for ten additional years in December 2015, but before the December 2016 IGF meeting in Mexico, an IGF Retreat was held on 14–16 July 2016 in Glen Cove, New York to focus on "Advancing the 10-Year Mandate of the Internet Governance Forum". At the time that the IGF mandate was extended, the UN General Assembly called for "progress on working modalities and the participation of relevant stakeholders from developing countries" and "accelerated implementation of recommendations in the report of the UN Commission on Science and Technology for Development (CSTD) Working Group on Improvements to the IGF."

Thus the retreat was framed by the mandates of the Tunis Agenda and WSIS+10 review. It also aimed to build on the report of the CSTD Working Group on improvements to the IGF and the many years of reflection of the MAG and the IGF community on improving the working methods of the IGF. The retreat was to focus on "how" the IGF could best work to deliver its role and how it could be best supported. As it focused on the "how", it would not try to carry out the substantive discussions that are to happen in the IGF itself.

The retreat reached the following understandings:

- In addition to its renewal of the IGF's mandate in December 2015, the UN General Assembly expressed expectations, specifically the need to show progress on working modalities and the participation of relevant stakeholders from developing countries, as well as for the accelerated implementation of the recommendations of the CSTD Working Group on improvements to the IGF.
- There was also recognition that improvements have been and continue to be made on an ongoing basis.
- The relevance of the IGF in the future is not assured, being dependent inter alia on increased voluntary funding to the multi-donor extra-budgetary IGF Trust Fund Project of the UN that funds the IGF Secretariat and on increased participation from a balanced and diverse set of stakeholders.
- Other fora are emerging for those wishing to engage in discussions about Internet governance. This suggested that the IGF's distinctiveness and value within this range of alternatives would need to remain sufficient to maintain participation levels from governments and the private sector in particular.
- A few participants felt that the MAG does not engage all parts of the community who want to take part in the discussion on Internet governance, and the IGF itself as well as the various intersessional activities could address this.
- The IGF has evolved over the years and is now seen by many as much more than an annual forum. Increasingly, it is seen as an ecosystem including national and regional IGFs, intersessional work, best practice fora, dynamic coalitions and other activities.
- More could be done to take a strategic, long-term view of the role and activities of the IGF, such as through a predictable multi-year programme of work. Even if not undertaken generally, it might be possible to reinvigorate the IGF by taking a longer-term view of particular issues, dedicating time and resources to progressing discussions and achieving concrete outcomes on these over time. it might be possible to move towards a continuous, predictable process for programming the work of the IGF.
- The IGF's innovative and unconventional multistakeholder structure and culture, compared with other UN processes, is generally felt to be one of its strengths. However, it also made it more difficult to integrate it with other UN processes. The same is true with respect to integrating the IGF and its institutional arrangements comfortably into expectations of multistakeholder processes. One of the challenges therefore is how to reconcile its bottom-up approach and stakeholder expectations with other multilateral processes within the UN system.
- The role of the MAG, in particular whether the MAG is expected or authorized to take on responsibilities beyond the programming of the annual IGF meetings, needs to be clarified in order to pursue significant innovations in the IGF.
- It was generally felt that the IGF Secretariat is under-resourced and hence lacks capacities for its current responsibilities, let alone additional activities.

== Organizational structure ==
Following an open consultation meeting called in February 2006, the UN Secretary-General established an Advisory Group (now known as the Multistakeholder Advisory Group, or MAG), and a Secretariat, as the main institutional bodies of the IGF.

=== Multistakeholder Advisory Group (MAG) ===
The Advisory Group, now known as the Multistakeholder Advisory Group (MAG), was established by the then UN Secretary-General, Kofi Annan on 17 May 2006, to assist in convening the first IGF, held in Athens, Greece. The MAG's mandate has been renewed or extended each year to provide assistance in the preparations for each upcoming IGF meeting.

The MAG meets for two days three times each year — in February, May and September. All three meetings take place in Geneva and are preceded by a one-day Open Consultations meeting. The details on the MAG's operating principles and selection criteria are contained in the summary reports of its meetings.

The MAG was originally made up of 46 members, but membership grew first to 47, then 50, and eventually 56. Members are from international governments, the commercial private sector and public civil society, including academic and technical communities. The MAG tries to renew roughly one third of the members within each stakeholder group each year. In 2011, because there were only three new MAG members in 2010, it was suggested that two thirds of each group's membership be renewed in 2012 and in fact 33 new members were appointed to the 56 member group.

The first MAG chairman was Nitin Desai, an Indian economist and former UN Under-Secretary-General for Economic and Social Affairs from 1992 to 2003. He also served as the Secretary-General's Special Adviser for the World Summit on the Information Society, later Special Advisor for Internet Governance.

- In 2007 Nitin Desai and Brazilian diplomat Hadil da Rocha Vianna served as co-chairs of the MAG.
- In 2008, 2009 and 2010 Nitin Desai served as MAG chair.
- In 2011 Alice Munyua, the Chair of the Kenyan IGF Steering Committee, was MAG chair.
- In 2012 Elmir Valizada, Deputy Minister of Communications and Information Technology, Azerbaijan was MAG chair.
- In 2013 Ashwin Sasongko, Director General of ICT Application, Ministry of Communication and Information Technology (CIT), Indonesia served as Honorary Chair with Markus Kummer, vice-president for Public Policy of the Internet Society as interim chair of the MAG.
- In 2014 and 2015 Jānis Kārkliņš, Ambassador-at-Large for the Government of Latvia, former Assistant Director-General of Communication and Information of UNESCO, Latvian Ambassador to France, Andorra, Monaco and UNESCO and participant in the World Summit on Information Society, serves as MAG chair.
- In 2016 United Nations Secretary-General Ban Ki-moon appointed Lynn St. Amour of the United States as the new MAG chair. Amour served from 2001 to 2014 as president and CEO of the Internet Society.
- In 2019 United Nations Secretary-General António Guterres appointed Anriette Esterhuysen of the Republic of South Africa as the new MAG chair. Before the appointment Esterhuysen was the executive director of the Association for Progressive Communications.

=== Secretariat ===
The Secretariat, based in the United Nations Office in Geneva, assists and coordinates the work of the Multistakeholder Advisory Group (MAG). The Secretariat also hosts internships and fellowships. Chengetai Masango is the Secretariat's Head of Office. Until 31 January 2011 the IGF Secretariat was headed by Executive Coordinator Markus Kummer. Kummer was also Executive Coordinator of the Secretariat of the UN Working Group on Internet Governance (WGIG). On 1 February 2011 he joined the Internet Society as its vice president for Public Policy.

== Activities ==
The following activities take place during IGF meetings: Main or focus sessions, Workshops, Dynamic Coalition meetings, Best Practice Forums, Side meetings, Host Country Sessions, 'Flash' Sessions, Open Forums, Inter-regional dialogue sessions, Newcomers track sessions, Lightning sessions, Unconference sessions, Pre-events, and the IGF Village.

=== Main or focus sessions ===
- The first IGF meeting in Greece in 2006 was organized around the main themes of: openness, security, diversity, and access.
- For IGF Brazil in 2007 a new theme, critical Internet resources, was introduced.
- For 2009 through 2012 there were six standard themes: (i) Internet governance for development, (ii) Emerging issues, (iii) Managing critical Internet resources, (iv) Security, openness, and privacy, (v) Access and diversity, and (vi) Taking stock and the way forward.
- For IGF Indonesia in 2013 the six main themes were: (i) Access and Diversity - Internet as an engine for growth and sustainable development; (ii) Openness - Human rights, freedom of expression and free flow of information on the Internet; (iii) Security - Legal and other frameworks: spam, hacking and cyber-crime; (iv) Enhanced cooperation; (v) Principles of multi-stakeholder cooperation; (vi) Internet governance principles.
- For IGF Turkey in 2014 the eight main themes were: (i) Policies Enabling Access; (ii) Content Creation, Dissemination and Use; (iii) Internet as an Engine for Growth and Development; (iv) IGF and The Future of the Internet Ecosystem; (v) Enhancing Digital Trust; (vi) Internet and Human Rights; (vii) Critical Internet Resources; and (viii) Emerging issues.
- For IGF Brazil in 2015 the eight main themes were: (i) Cybersecurity and Trust; (ii) Internet Economy; (iii) Inclusiveness and Diversity; (iv) Openness; (v) Enhancing Multistakeholder Cooperation; (vi) Internet and Human Rights; (vii) Critical Internet Resources; and (viii) Emerging issues.
- For IGF Mexico in 2016 a less formal and more bottom up approach was used to develop the meeting's main themes. The nine themes that emerged were: (i) Sustainable Development and the Internet Economy; (ii) Access and Diversity; (iii) Gender and Youth Issues; (iv) Human Rights Online; (v) Cybersecurity; (vi) Multistakeholder Cooperation; (vii) Critical Internet Resources; (viii) Internet governance capacity building; and (ix) Emerging Issues that may affect the future of the open Internet.

=== Workshops ===
Each year starting in 2007, the IGF has hosted a number of workshops (workshop with panel, roundtable, capacity building session). Workshop topics have included expanding Internet access, Internet regulation, security measures such as RPKI, and human rights.

=== Dynamic coalitions ===
The most tangible result of the first IGF in Athens was the establishment of a number of so-called dynamic coalitions. These coalitions are relatively informal, issue-specific groups consisting of stakeholders that are interested in the particular issue. Most coalitions allow participation of anyone interested in contributing. Thus, these groups gather not only academics and representatives of governments, but also members of the civil society interested in participating on the debates and engaged in the coalition's works.

For example, dynamic coalitions have included Accessibility and Disability, Freedom of Expression and Freedom of the Media on the Internet (FOEonline), Internet Rights and Principles / Internet Bill of Rights, Online Collaboration, and Privacy.

=== Best practice forums ===
Starting in 2014 these sessions demonstrate some of the best practices that have been adapted with regard to the key IGF themes and the development and deployment of the Internet. The sessions provide an opportunity to discuss what constitutes a "best practice", to share relevant information and experiences and build consensus around best practices that can then be transferred to other situations, and strengthen capacity building activities.

The five Best Practice Forums held during IGF 2014 were:

- Developing Meaningful Multistakeholder Mechanisms;
- Regulation and Mitigation of Unwanted Communications (Spam);
- Establishing and Supporting CERTs for Internet security;
- Creating an Enabling Environment for the Development of Local Content; and
- Online Child Safety and Protection.

=== 'Flash' sessions ===
A flash session provides an opportunity for presenters/organisers to evoke/sparkle interest of the participants in specific reports, case studies, best practices, methodologies, tools, etc. that have already been implemented or are in the process of implementation. Participants have an opportunity to ask very specific questions. Flash Sessions will generally be shorter than other types of sessions.

=== Open forums ===
All major organizations dealing with Internet governance related issues are given a 90-minute time slot, at their request, to hold an Open Forum in order to present and discuss their activities during the past year and allow for questions and discussions.

Examples of recent Open fora include:

- Consultation on ten-year review of WSIS (CSTD)
- The Economics of an Open Internet (OECD)
- Governmental Advisory Committee (GAC) Open Forum (ICANN)
- ICANN Open Forum
- Internet & Jurisdiction Policy Network Open Forum
- ISOC@IGF: Dedicated to an open accessible Internet (Internet Society)
- South Korea's effort to advance the Internet environment including IPv6 deployment (MSIP and KISA)
- Launch of Revised Guidelines on for Industry on Child Online Protection (ITU and UNICEF)
- Measuring what and how: Capturing the effects of the Internet we want (World Wide Web Foundation)
- Multi-stakeholder Consultation on UNESCO's Comprehensive Study on the Internet (UNESCO)
- Protecting Human Rights Online (Freedom Online Coalition)
- Your Internet, Our Aim: Guide Internet Users to Their Human Rights (Council of Europe)

=== Regional, national, and youth initiatives ===
A number of regional, national, and youth initiatives hold separate meetings throughout the year and an inter-regional dialogue session at the annual IGF meeting. EuroDIG was the first regional IGF initiative, initiated in 2008.

=== Lightning sessions ===
At IGF 2016 Lightning sessions were introduced as quicker, more informal versions of full-length workshops or presentations. The 20-minute sessions took place during lunch breaks in a shaded outdoor plaza in front of the venue.

=== Unconference sessions ===
At IGF 2016 Unconference sessions were introduced. The 20 to 40 minute talks are not pre-scheduled, participants reserve a speaking slot by signing up on a scheduling board on a first-come, first-served basis on the day of the Unconference.

=== Newcomers track ===
Introduced at IGF 2016, the newcomers track helps participants attending the IGF meeting for the first time, to understand the IGF processes, foster the integration of all new-coming stakeholders into the IGF community, and make the meeting participant's first IGF experience as productive and welcoming as possible. Newcomer sessions held in 2016 included explaining the roles of stakeholder groups within the IGF.

=== IGF Village ===
The IGF Village provides booths and meeting areas where participants may present their organizations and hold informal meetings.

=== Pre-events ===
Pre-events were held the day before the IGF Turkey meeting in 2014.

== Meetings ==
Four-day IGF meetings have been held in the last quarter of each year starting in 2006.

=== IGF I — Athens, Greece 2006 ===
The first meeting of the IGF was held in Athens, Greece from 30 October to 2 November 2006. The overall theme for the meeting was: "Internet Governance for Development". The agenda was structured along five broad themes: openness, security, diversity, access and new issues.

=== IGF II — Rio de Janeiro, Brazil 2007 ===
The second meeting of the IGF was held in Rio de Janeiro on 12–15 November 2007. The overall theme for the meeting was: "Internet Governance for Development". The main sessions were organized around five themes: (i) Critical Internet resources; (ii) Access; (iii) Diversity; (iv) Openness, and (v) Security.

=== IGF III — Hyderabad, India 2008 ===
The third meeting of the IGF was held in Hyderabad, India between 3–6 December 2008. The overall theme for the meeting was "Internet for All". The meeting was held in the aftermath of terrorist attacks in Mumbai. The participants expressed their sympathies to the families of the victims and the Government and the people of India. The five main sessions were organized around the themes: (i) Reaching the next billion, (ii) Promoting cyber-security and trust, (iii) Managing critical Internet resources, (iv) Emerging issues - the Internet of tomorrow, and (v) Taking stock and the way forward. The meeting was attended by 1280 participants from 94 countries.

=== IGF IV — Sharm El Sheikh, Egypt 2009 ===
Egypt hosted the fourth IGF meeting from 15 to 18 November 2009 in Sharm El Sheikh. The overall theme for the meeting was: "Internet Governance – Creating Opportunities for all". IGF IV marked the beginning of a new multi-stakeholder process. The main sessions on the agenda were (i) Managing critical Internet resources; (ii) Security, openness and privacy; (iii) Access and diversity; (iv) Internet governance in light of the WSIS principles; (v) Taking stock and the way forward: the desirability of the continuation of the forum; and (vi) Emerging Issues: impact of social networks. A key focus of IGF 2009 was encouraging youth participation in Internet Governance issues.

=== IGF V — Vilnius, Lithuania 2010 ===
The fifth IGF meeting was held in Vilnius, Lithuania on 14–17 September 2010. The overall theme for the meeting was "Developing the future together". The meeting was organized around six themes: (i) Internet governance for development, (ii) Emerging issues: cloud computing, (iii) Managing critical Internet resources, (iv) Security, openness, and privacy, (v) Access and diversity, and (vi) Taking stock and the way forward.

=== IGF VI — Nairobi, Kenya 2011 ===
The sixth IGF meeting was held in Nairobi, Kenya on 27–30 September 2011, at the United Nations Office (UNON). The overall theme for the meeting was "Internet as a catalyst for change: access, development, freedoms and innovation". The meeting was organized around the traditional six themes: (i) Internet governance for development, (ii) Emerging issues, (iii) Managing critical Internet resources, (iv) Security, openness, and privacy, (v) Access and diversity, and (vi) Taking stock and the way forward.

=== IGF VII — Baku, Azerbaijan 2012 ===
The seventh IGF meeting was held in Baku, Azerbaijan on 6–9 November 2012. The overall theme for the meeting was: "Internet Governance for Sustainable Human, Economic and Social Development", with six themes of "development"; new issues; internet resources; security, openness and privacy; access and diversity; present and future.

=== IGF VIII — Bali, Indonesia 2013 ===
The eighth IGF meeting was held in Bali, Indonesia from 22 to 25 October 2013. 135 focus sessions, workshops, open forums, flash sessions, and other meetings took place over the 4 day event. The overarching theme for meeting was: "Building Bridges - Enhancing Multistakeholder Cooperation for Growth and Sustainable Development". The meeting was organized around six sub-themes: (i) Access and Diversity - Internet as an engine for growth and sustainable development; (ii) Openness - Human rights, freedom of expression and free flow of information on the Internet; (iii) Security - Legal and other frameworks: spam, hacking and cyber-crime; (iv) Enhanced cooperation; (v) Principles of multi-stakeholder cooperation; (vi) Internet governance principles. In the context of the recent revelations about government-led Internet surveillance activities, IGF 2013 was marked by many discussions about the need to ensure better protection of all citizens in the online environment and to reach a proper balance between actions driven by national security concerns and the respect for internationally recognized human rights, such as the right to privacy and freedom of expression.

=== IGF IX — Istanbul, Turkey 2014 ===
The ninth IGF meeting was held in Istanbul, Turkey from 2 to 5 September 2014. The meeting included 135 sessions and 14 pre-events. The overarching theme for meeting was: "Connecting Continents for Enhanced Multi-stakeholder Internet Governance". The meeting was organized around eight sub-themes: (i) Policies Enabling Access; (ii) Content Creation, Dissemination and Use; (iii) Internet as an Engine for Growth and Development; (iv) IGF and The Future of the Internet Ecosystem; (v) Enhancing Digital Trust; (vi) Internet and Human Rights; (vii) Critical Internet Resources; and (viii) Emerging Issues.

=== IGF X — João Pessoa, Brazil 2015 ===
The tenth IGF meeting was held in João Pessoa, Brazil from 10 to 13 November 2015. The meeting included more than 150 sessions and 21 pre-events. The overarching theme for the meeting was: "Evolution of Internet Governance: Empowering Sustainable Development". The meeting was organized around eight sub-themes: (i) Cybersecurity and Trust; (ii) Internet Economy; (iii) Inclusiveness and Diversity; (iv) Openness; (v) Enhancing Multistakeholder Cooperation; (vi) Internet and Human Rights; (vii) Critical Internet Resources and (viii) Emerging Issues.

=== IGF XI — Guadalajara, Mexico 2016 ===
The eleventh IGF meeting was held in Guadalajara, Mexico, from 6 to 9 December 2016. The meeting included 205 sessions as well as 24 pre-events (7 host country and ceremonial sessions; 8 main sessions; 96 workshops; 31 open forums; 4 individual Best Practice Forum sessions; 14 individual Dynamic Coalition sessions; 23 lightning sessions; 5 unconference sessions; 17 sessions classified "other"; and 24 pre-events). Experimental Lightning and Unconference sessions were held for the first time. A newcomers track helped participants attending the IGF meeting for the first time, to understand the IGF processes, foster the integration of all new-coming stakeholders into the IGF community, and make the meeting participant's first IGF experience as productive and welcoming as possible.

The overarching theme for the meeting was: "Enabling Inclusive and Sustainable Growth". The meeting addressed a broad range of themes and issues including, but not limited to, Sustainable Development and the Internet Economy; Access and Diversity; Gender and Youth Issues; Human Rights Online; Cybersecurity; Multistakeholder Cooperation; Critical Internet Resources; Internet governance capacity building; and Emerging Issues that may affect the future of the open Internet.

=== IGF XII — Geneva, Switzerland 2017 ===
The twelfth IGF meeting took place in Geneva, Switzerland, from 18 to 21 December 2017. The programme included 4 host country and ceremonial sessions; 8 main/special sessions; 99 workshops; 45 open forums; 4 individual BPF sessions; 15 individual DC sessions; 8 individual NRIs sessions; 13 sessions classified as “other”; 24 lightning sessions; and 40 Day 0 events; for a total of 260 sessions in the overall programme (220 if Day 0 events are not counted). 55 booths were featured in the IGF Village.

The overarching meeting theme was "Shape Your Digital Future!". The meeting addressed a broad range of issues including, the future of global cooperation on Digital Governance; the impact of digitization on democracy, public trust and public opinion; Internet and the Sustainable Development Goals; access and diversity; the digital transformation and its socio-economic and labour impacts; youth and gender challenges pertaining to the Internet; the protection and promotion of human rights online; cybersecurity; intended and unintended global impacts of local interventions; the need to enhance multistakeholder cooperation; critical Internet resources; Internet governance capacity-building; and other emerging issues that enhance and affect the future of the open Internet.

=== IGF XIII — Paris, France 2018 ===
The thirteenth IGF meeting took place in Paris, from 12 to 14 November 2018. In addition to the Opening and Closing Sessions, the IGF 2018 programme featured 8 main/special sessions; 71 workshops; 27 open forums; 5 individual best practice forum (BPF) sessions; 15 individual dynamic coalition (DC) sessions; 5 individual national, regional, and youth (NRIs) collaborative sessions; 14 sessions classified as “other”; and 24 lightning sessions; for a total of 171 sessions in the overall programme.

IGF XIII was held as part of the Paris Digital Week which, in addition to the IGF, featured the inaugural events of the Paris Peace Forum and the Govtech Summit. UN Secretary-General (SG) António Guterres addressed the IGF, marking the first time in Forum's history that a SG has attended in person. French President Macron addressed the IGF at the opening ceremony and launched the "Paris Call for Trust and Security in Cyberspace", a framework for regulating the Internet and fighting back against cyber attacks, hate speech and other cyber threats. Eight themes formed the backbone of the 2018 agenda: (i) Cybersecurity, Trust and Privacy; (ii) Development, Innovation and Economic Issues; (iii) Digital Inclusion and Accessibility; (iv) Human Rights, Gender and Youth; (v) Emerging Technologies; (vi) Evolution of Internet Governance; (vii) Media and Content; and (viii) Technical and Operational Issues.

=== IGF XIV — Berlin, Germany 2019 ===
The fourteenth IGF meeting took place in Berlin, from 25 to 29 November 2019.

=== IGF XV — online, 2020 ===
The Fifteenth Annual Meeting of the Internet Governance Forum (IGF) was hosted online by the United Nations under the overarching theme: Internet for human resilience and solidarity. The first phase was hosted on 2–6 November and the second one on 9–17 November 2020.

=== IGF XVI — Katowice, Poland 2021 ===
The 16th annual IGF meeting was hosted by the Government of Poland in Katowice during 6–10 December, under the overarching theme: Internet United.

=== IGF XVII — Addis Ababa, Ethiopia 2022 ===
The 17th annual IGF meeting was hosted by the Government of Ethiopia in Addis Ababa from 28 November to 2 December, under the overarching theme: Resilient Internet for a Shared Sustainable and Common Future.

=== IGF XVIII — Kyoto, Japan 2023 ===
The 18th annual IGF meeting was hosted by the Government of Japan in Kyoto from 8 to 12 October, under the overarching theme: The Internet We Want - Empowering All People.

=== IGF XIX — Riyadh, Saudi Arabia 2024 ===
The 19th annual IGF meeting was hosted by the Government of Saudi Arabia in Riyadh from 15 to 19 December. The location drew strong criticism and calls by Access Now and Article 19 to reverse it due to the situation of human rights in Saudi Arabia. The overarching theme was: Building our Multistakeholder Digital Future.

=== IGF XX — Lillestrøm/Oslo, Norway 2025 ===
The 20th annual IGF meeting was hosted by the Government of Norway in Lillestrøm near Oslo from 23 to 27 June under the overarching theme: Building Digital Governance Together. There were two known bidders, Norway and Russia.

== Attendance ==
=== Onsite attendance ===
Onsite attendance at the first IGF meeting in 2006 was estimated to be around one thousand participants and has grown to between 1500 and 2200 participants from over 100 countries. In recent years participants have typically been roughly 60% men and 40% women. Participants are drawn from civil society, governments, the private sector, the technical community, the media, and intergovernmental organizations.

Onsite attendance details by meeting
- IGF I — Athens, Greece 2006: Attendance was estimated to be around one thousand participants.
- IGF II — Rio de Janeiro, Brazil 2007: There were over 2,100 registered participants prior to the meeting, of which 700 came from civil society, 550 from government, 300 from business entities, 100 from international organizations, and 400 representing other categories. The meeting was attended by 1,363 participants from 109 countries. Over 100 members of the press attended.
- IGF III — Hyderabad, India 2008: The meeting was held in the aftermath of terrorist attacks in Mumbai. While these tragic events led to some cancellations, the overall attendance with 1280 participants from 94 countries, of which 133 were media representatives, was close to that at the second annual meeting.
- IGF IV — Sharm El Sheikh, Egypt 2009: With more than 1800 participants from 112 countries the Sharm meeting had the largest attendance of any IGF to date. 96 governments were represented. 122 media representatives were accredited.
- IGF V — Vilnius, Lithuania 2010: With close to 2000 badges issued and 1461 participants, attendance at the Vilnius meeting was similar to the 2009 meeting in Sharm El Sheikh.
- IGF VI — Nairobi, Kenya 2011: More than 2,000 participants attended, the highest attendance of IGF meetings held so far. 125 governments were represented. 68 media representatives were accredited. The approximate nationality distribution was: African (53%), WEOG-Western European and Others Group (29%), Asian (11%), GRULAC-Latin American and Caribbean Group (4%) and Eastern Europe (3%).
- IGF VII — Baku, Azerbaijan 2012: More than 1,600 delegates representing 128 different countries attended with a particularly strong presence from civil society as this was the highest represented stakeholder group at the forum. Participation was regionally diverse and the participation of women at the forum increased significantly from previous years. Youth representation and activity was also sited to be a notable achievement.
- IGF VIII — Bali, Indonesia 2013: Nearly 1,500 delegates representing 111 different countries convened in Bali. Once again civil society was the largest represented stakeholder group at the forum.
- IGF IX — Istanbul, Turkey 2014: More than 2,400 delegates representing 144 different countries convened in Istanbul. Once again civil society was the largest represented stakeholder group at the forum with 779 participants, followed by the private sector with 581, governments with 571, the technical community with 266, the media with 110, and intergovernmental organizations with 96. The approximate regional distribution was: Turkey (31%), Africa (8%), WEOG-Western European and Others (32%), Asia Pacific (17%), GRULAC-Latin American and Caribbean Group (6%) and Eastern Europe (6%).
- IGF X — João Pessoa, Brazil 2015: More than 2,130 delegates representing 112 different countries convened in João Pessoa. Once again civil society was the largest represented stakeholder group at the forum with 44% of the participants, followed by governments with 22%, the private sector with 12%, the technical community with 10%, the media with 8%, and intergovernmental organizations with 4%. The approximate regional distribution was: Brazil (49%), Africa (5%), WEOG-Western European and Others (26%), Asia Pacific (8%), GRULAC-Latin American and Caribbean Group (9%) and Eastern Europe (3%). 62% of the participants were men and 38% were women.
- IGF XI — Jalisco, Mexico 2016: The program included 229 sessions attended by more than 2,000 onsite participants, from 123 countries. Once again civil society was the largest represented stakeholder group at the forum with 45% of the participants, followed by governments with 21%, the private sector with 15%, the technical community with 14%, the media with 3%, and intergovernmental organizations with 3%. The approximate regional distribution was: Africa (7%), WEOG-Western European and Others (27%), Asia Pacific (13%), GRULAC-Latin American and Caribbean Group (51%) and Eastern Europe (3%). 60% of the participants were men and 40% were women.
- IGF XII — Geneva, Switzerland 2017: The program included 220 sessions attended by more than 2,000 onsite participants, from 142 countries. Once again civil society was the largest represented stakeholder group at the forum with 45% of the participants, followed by governments with 20%, the private sector with 15%, the technical community with 14%, the media with 0.4%, and intergovernmental organizations with 6%. The approximate regional distribution was: Africa (11%), WEOG-Western European and Others (46%), Asia Pacific (18%), GRULAC-Latin American and Caribbean Group (12%) and Eastern Europe (8%). 57% of the participants were men and 43% were women.
- IGF XIII — Paris, France 2018: The program included 171 sessions attended by more than 1,600 onsite participants, from 143 countries. Civil society was the largest represented stakeholder group at the forum with 45% of the participants, followed by governments with 16%, the private sector with 20%, the technical community with 11%, the media with 1%, and intergovernmental organizations with 7%. The approximate regional distribution was: Africa (25%), WEOG-Western European and Others (38%), Asia Pacific (16%), GRULAC-Latin American and Caribbean Group (9%), Eastern Europe (6%), and Intergovernmental Organizations (6%). 57% of the participants were men and 43% were women.

=== Remote participation ===
The Remote Participation Working Group (RPWG) has worked closely with the IGF Secretariat starting in 2008 to allow remote participants across the globe to interact in the IGF meetings.

Remote participation details by meeting
- IGF I — Athens, Greece 2006: Remote participants were able to take part via blogs, chat rooms, email, and text messaging.
- IGF II — Rio de Janeiro, Brazil 2007: The entire meeting was webcast and transcribed in real time. Video and text records were made available on the IGF Web site.
- IGF III — Hyderabad, India 2008: The entire meeting was webcast in real-time using high quality video, audio streaming, and live chat. There were 522 remote participants from around the world who joined the main sessions and workshops. Remote hubs were also introduced with remote moderators leading discussions in their region. Most of the hubs were able to discuss pertinent local and domestic Internet Governance issues. The Remote Hubs were located in Buenos Aires, Argentina, Belgrade, Serbia, São Paulo (Brazil), Pune (India), Lahore (Pakistan), Bogotà (Colombia), Barcelona and Madrid (Spain). The platform used for remote participation was DimDim. The text transcripts of the main sessions, the video and audio records of all workshops and other meetings were made available through the IGF Web site.
- IGF IV — Sharm El Sheikh, Egypt 2009: The entire meeting was Webcast, with video streaming provided from the main session room and audio streaming provided from all workshop meeting rooms. The proceedings of the main sessions were transcribed and displayed in the main session hall in real-time and streamed to the Web. Remote hubs in 11 locations around the world allowed remote participation. The text transcripts of the main sessions, the video and audio records of all workshops and other meetings were made available through the IGF Web site. Webex was used as the remote participation platform.
- IGF V — Vilnius, Lithuania 2010: The entire meeting was Webcast, with video streaming provided from the main session room and all nine other meeting rooms. All proceedings were transcribed and displayed in the meeting rooms in real-time and streamed to the Web. Remote hubs in 32 locations around the world provided the means for more than 600 people who could not travel to the meeting to participate actively in the forum and contribute to discussions.The text transcripts as well as the video and audio records of all official meetings are archived on the IGF Web site.
- IGF VI — Nairobi, Kenya 2011: All the main sessions and workshops had real time transcription. The entire meeting was Webcast, with video streaming provided from the main session room and audio streaming provided from all workshop meeting rooms. Remote hubs were established in 47 locations, and provided the means for more than 823 people participate contribute to discussions. 38 remote participants/panelists participated via video or audio and an approximate 2,500 connections were made throughout the week from 89 countries. The text transcripts and video of all meetings were made available through the IGF Website.
- IGF VII — Baku, Azerbaijan 2012: Real time transcription was available. The entire meeting was webcast and remote participation was offered, which doubled the active participation in main sessions, workshops, and other events. 49 expert remote participants and panelists participated in various sessions via video and audio. 52 different remote ‘hubs’ allowed remote participants to gather together to follow the proceedings in Baku online. There was also an increase in social media activity allowing discussions to begin prior to the start of the meeting, continue between sessions and during breaks throughout the week and extend after delegates left Baku to return home. There were thousands of ‘tweets’ about the forum each day, which reached millions of followers.
- IGF VIII — Bali, Indonesia 2013: Real time transcription was available. The entire meeting was web-cast and remote participation more than doubled the in person participation. Approximately 1,704 connections were made to the meetings remotely from participants from 83 different countries. All web-cast videos were immediately uploaded to YouTube after the sessions ended allowing for additional public viewership. There were approximately 25 remote hubs and more than 100 remote presenters. Millions of interested individuals followed the proceedings on Twitter.
- IGF IX — Istanbul, Turkey 2014: There were nearly 1,300 remote participants. Real time transcription was available. The entire meeting was web-cast and all web-cast videos were uploaded to YouTube after sessions ended allowing for additional public viewership. Flickr, Facebook, Twitter, and Tumblr were all widely used. Twitter messages using the hashtag, #IGF2014, reached more than 4 million people each day.
- IGF X — João Pessoa, Brazil 2015: Approximately 50 remote hubs were organized around the world, with an estimated 2000 active participants online. Real time transcription was available. The entire meeting was web-cast and all web-cast videos were uploaded to YouTube after sessions ended allowing for additional public viewership. Flickr, Facebook, Twitter, and Tumblr were all widely used.
- IGF XI — Jalisco, Mexico 2016: 45 remote hubs were organized around the world, with 2,000 stakeholders participating online. The largest number of online participants came from the following countries: United States, Mexico, Nigeria, Brazil, India, Cuba, United Kingdom, China, Japan, Tunisia and Argentina.
- IGF XII — Geneva, Switzerland 2017: 32 remote hubs were organised around the world, with 1661 stakeholders participating online. The largest number of online participants came from the following countries: United States, Switzerland, Nigeria, China, India, Brazil, France, United Kingdom and Mexico.
- IGF XIII — Paris, France 2018: Approximately 1400 people from 101 different countries participated online with the majority coming from France, United States, Brazil, Nigeria, United Kingdom, India, Iran, Bangladesh, and Germany. There were 35 remote hubs organised around the world representing all regions, 42% from Africa and 22% from both the Latin America and Caribbean and the Asia-Pacific regions, with an active online presence, video-sharing and live-comments.

== See also ==
- Timeline of the history of the Internet
