= IPv6 deployment =

Overview of the deployment of IPv6

The deployment of IPv6, the latest version of the Internet Protocol (IP), has been in progress since the mid-2000s. IPv6 was designed as the successor protocol for IPv4 with an expanded addressing space. IPv4, which has been in use since 1982, is in the final stages of exhausting its unallocated address space, but still carries most Internet traffic.

By 2011, all major operating systems in use on personal computers and server systems had production-quality IPv6 implementations. Mobile telephone networks present a large deployment field for Internet-connected devices in which voice is provisioned as a voice over IP (VoIP) service. In 2009, the US cellular operator Verizon released technical specifications for devices to operate on its 4G networks. The specification mandates IPv6 operation according to the 3GPP Release 8 Specifications (March 2009), and deprecates IPv4 as an optional capability.

As of April 2026, Google's statistics shows use of IPv6 by its global user base at around 45–50% depending on the day of the week (greater on weekends). Adoption is uneven across countries and Internet service providers. Countries including France, Germany and India now run the majority of their traffic to Google over IPv6, with other countries including the United States, Brazil and Japan at around 50%. Russia and Australia have over 30% adoption, while China has less than 5% and some countries such as Sudan and Turkmenistan have less than 1% IPv6 adoption.

== Deployment tools and evaluation ==
Number of IPv6 prefixes and AS on the Internet since 2003

Monthly IPv6 allocations per RIR

=== Rapid deployment tools ===
Tools such as 6rd, conceived by Rémi Després, have been developed to enable IPv6 rapid deployment.

=== Statistics and monitoring ===
Google publishes statistics on IPv6 adoption among Google users. A graph of IPv6 adoption since 2008 and a map of IPv6 deployment by country are available.

APNIC publishes statistics for worldwide adoption of IPv6 over time. This also includes per-country data.

A global view into the history of the growing IPv6 routing tables can be obtained with the SixXS Ghost Route Hunter. This tool provided a list of all allocated IPv6 prefixes until 2014 and marks with colors the ones that were actually being announced into the Internet BGP tables. When a prefix was announced, it means that the ISP at least can receive IPv6 packets for their prefix.

The integration of IPv6 on existing network infrastructure may be monitored from other sources, for example:

- Regional Internet registries (RIR) IPv6 prefix allocation
- IPv6 transit services
- Japan ISP IPv6 services

On 28 March 2026, IPv6 traffic to Google exceeded 50% for the first time, marking a historic milestone in the transition away from IPv4. This followed years of steady growth, with global adoption standing at approximately 43% in early 2025 before accelerating. Country-level adoption varies widely, with France (73%), India (72%), and Saudi Arabia (65%) among the leaders, while Italy (17%), Spain (10%), and Egypt (4%) lag significantly behind.

=== Testing, evaluation, and certification ===
A few organizations are involved with international IPv6 test and evaluation, ranging from the United States Department of Defense to the University of New Hampshire.

- The US DoD Joint Interoperability Test Command DoD IPv6 Product Certification Program
- University of New Hampshire InterOperability Laboratory involvement in the IPv6 Ready Logo Program

== Major milestones ==
Year	Major development and availability milestones
1996	IPv6 support in the Linux kernel was originally developed by Pedro Roque and integrated into mainline at the end of 1996, which was one of the earliest implementations of an IPv6 stack in the world.
1996	6bone (an IPv6 virtual network for testing) is started.
1997	October 31, 1997 IBM's AIX 4.3 is the first commercial platform supporting IPv6.
1997	Also in 1997, Early Adopter Kits for DEC's operating systems, Tru64 and OpenVMS, are made available.
1998	Microsoft Research releases its first experimental IPv6 stack. This support is not intended for use in a production environment.
1999	In February, the IPv6 Forum is founded by the IETF Deployment WG to drive deployment worldwide. This results in the creation of regional and local IPv6 Task Forces.
1999	Implementation of the first IPv6 tunnel broker, by Ivano Guardini that also contributed the RFC:3053, at CSELT.
2000	Production-quality BSD support for IPv6 becomes generally available in early to mid-2000 in FreeBSD, OpenBSD, and NetBSD via the KAME project.
2000	Microsoft releases an IPv6 technology preview version for Windows 2000 in March 2000.
2000	Sun Solaris supports IPv6 in Solaris 8 in February.
2000	Compaq ships IPv6 with Tru64.
2001	In January, Compaq ships IPv6 with OpenVMS.
2001	Cisco Systems introduces IPv6 support on Cisco IOS routers and L3 switches.
2001	HP introduces IPv6 with HP-UX 11i v1.
2001	On April 23, 2001, the European Commission launches the European IPv6 Task Force
2002	Microsoft Windows NT 4.0 and Windows 2000 SP1 have limited IPv6 support for research and testing since at least 2002.
2002	Microsoft Windows XP (2001) supports IPv6 for developmental purposes. In Windows XP SP1 (2002) and Windows Server 2003, IPv6 is included as a core networking technology, suitable for commercial deployment.
2002	IBM z/OS supports IPv6 since version 1.4 (general availability in September 2002).
2003	Apple Mac OS X v10.3 "Panther" (2003) supports IPv6 which is enabled by default.
2004	In July, ICANN announces that IPv6 address records for the Japan (jp) and Korea (kr) country code top-level domain nameservers are visible in the DNS root server zone files with serial number 2004072000. The IPv6 records for France (fr) are added later. This makes IPv6 DNS publicly operational.
2005	Linux 2.6.12 removes experimental status from its IPv6 implementation.
2007	Microsoft Windows Vista (2007) supports IPv6 which is enabled by default.
2007	Apple's AirPort Extreme 802.11n base station includes an IPv6 gateway in its default configuration. It uses 6to4 tunneling and manually configured static tunnels. (Note: 6to4 was disabled by default in later firmware revisions.)
2007	On March 8, 2007, IPv6 Forum, Stealth Communications and CounterPath Solutions, announced worldwide VoIP interoperability using IPv6 and Asterisk (PBX)
2008	On February 4, 2008, IANA adds AAAA records for the IPv6 addresses of six root name servers. With this transition, it is now possible to resolve domain names using only IPv6.
2008	On March 12, 2008, the IETF does an hour-long IPv4 blackout at its meeting as an opportunity to capture informal experience data to inform protocol design work going forward; this led to many fixes in operating systems and applications.
2008	On May 27, 2008, the European Commission publish their Action Plan for the deployment of Internet Protocol version 6 (IPv6) in Europe, with the aim of making IPv6 available to 25% of European users by 2010.
2011	On June 8, 2011, the Internet Society, in conjunction with several large companies and organizations, held World IPv6 Day, a global 24-hour test of IPv6.
2012	On June 6, 2012, the Internet Society, in conjunction with many large companies and organizations, held World IPv6 Launch Day, a global permanent deployment of IPv6.
2013	On November 22, 2013, the Xbox One becomes the first dedicated video game console from a major company to support IPv6.

== Operating system support ==
By 2011, all major operating systems in use on personal computers and server systems had production-quality IPv6 implementations. Microsoft Windows has supported IPv6 since Windows 2000, and in production-ready state beginning with Windows XP. Windows Vista and later have improved IPv6 support. macOS since Panther (10.3), Linux 2.6, FreeBSD, and Solaris also have mature production implementations. Some implementations of the BitTorrent peer-to-peer file transfer protocol make use of IPv6 to avoid NAT issues common for IPv4 private networks.

== Browser support ==
As of 2025, all major web browsers support the Happy Eyeballs mechanism, in which they attempt to first create an IPv6 connection to dual stack endpoints wherever an IPv6 address is available as an option, falling back to IPv4 only if IPv6 connection is not immediately possible. This eliminates the problem where IPv6 connectivity problems would make it less reliable than IPv4 in some cases, dissuaded service operators for rolling out IPv6. This has greatly increased IPv6 adoption.

== Government encouragement ==
In the early 2000s, governments increasingly required support for IPv6 in new equipment. The US government, for example, specified in 2005 that the network backbones of all federal agencies had to be upgraded to IPv6 by June 30, 2008; this was completed before the deadline. In addition, the US government in 2010 required federal agencies to provide native dual-stacked IPv4/IPv6 access to external/public services by 2012, and internal clients were to utilize IPv6 by 2014. On November 19, 2020, the United States Office of Management and Budget (OMB) issued the latest US federal government IPv6-only policy in its memorandum (M-21-07) directing all federal government agencies to complete at least 80% of the transition from IPv4 to the single stack of IPv6 by 2025. Progress on the US government's external facing IPv6 services is tracked by NIST. The government of the People's Republic of China implemented a five-year plan for deployment of IPv6 called the China Next Generation Internet (see below).

== Coexistence with IPv4 ==
On 7 March 2013, the Internet Engineering Task Force created a working group for IPv4 sunset in preparation for protocol changes that could be used to support sunset/shutdown of remnant IPv4 networks. However, in May 2018 this working group was closed as no immediate work could be identified due to the slow transition to IPv6.

The Internet Engineering Task Force expects IPv6 to coexist with IPv4 as it is considered impractical to fully transition to IPv6 in the short term. The coexistence is expected to be based on dual-stack, tunneling or translation mechanisms. Dual-stack implementations required two parallel logical networks, increasing cost and complexity of the network. IPv4 networks are expected to slowly transition into segmented subnetworks using IPv4 Residual Deployment.

The slow transition to IPv6 has caused significant resentment in the Internet community.

As a result, many larger enterprises, such as Microsoft, are transitioning to phasing out IPv4 and moving towards IPv6 Single-Stack within the company. In a 2019 blog, the company describes their heavily translated IPv4 network as "potentially fragile", "operationally challenging", and with regard to dual-stack operations (i.e. those running IPv4 and IPv6 simultaneously) "complex".

Geoff Huston wrote an article for APNIC in late 2024 suggesting that, while linear extrapolation suggested that the IPv6 transition might eventually be finished by 2045, it was a possibility that it might end up coexisting with IPv4 indefinitely because of changes in the Internet architecture from being a global application-agnostic network to one primarily focused on delivering services hosted from nearby data centres.

== Deployment by country and region ==
=== Algeria ===
AnwarNet (www.anwarnet.dz); AfriNIC has allocated range of IPv6 address space to AnwarNet. AnwarNet started IPV6 services in 2011.

=== Australia ===
- AARNet completed network AARNet 3, a high-speed network connecting academic and research customers in the major metropolitan centres, with international links to major ISPs in the US, Asia, and Europe. One of the design goals was to support both IPv4 and IPv6 protocols equally. It also supports multicast routing and jumbo frames.
- IPv6 Now Pty Ltd introduced the first commercial-grade IPv6 tunnel broker service in Australia on April 30, 2008. Also, in June 2008, IPv6Now introduced the first dual-stacked (IPv4 & IPv6) web hosting service.
- Internode is the first commercial ISP in Australia to have full IPv6 connectivity and make IPv6 available to customers. The availability to customers was officially announced to Whirlpool on July 18, 2008.
- The Victorian State government granted A$350,000 to establish an IPv6 testbed network (VIC6) freely available to industry to evaluate their IPv6 products and strategies.
- Telstra announced on 5 September 2011 that their backbone network was fully double-stacked and that they had commenced providing its enterprise, government and wholesale customers with IPv6 connectivity, and helping customers through the transition; they would activate IPv6 addressing for its mobile network on 12 September 2016.
- Telstra announced by email on 6 February 2020 that their mobile network is now purely IPv6.
- Aussie Broadband started enabling IPv6 for all new residential NBN customers' services on 1 November 2021.

=== Bangladesh ===
- Infolink successfully tested and started commercial IPv6 beta deployment to end user for the first time in Bangladesh on May 22, 2017.
- SpeedLinks successfully tested and started commercial IPv6 deployment to end user for the first time in Rangpur Division, Bangladesh on January 25, 2022.

=== Belgium ===
- On July 13, 2010, Logica Netherlands (operating within the SPITS project in cooperation with Mobistar Belgium) successfully tested native IPv6 over UMTS/GPRS in Belgium and the Netherlands within a vehicle platform as an Intelligent transportation system solution. The test was performed both in GSM and in tethering mode using a Nokia smartphone.
- Since September 2013, research and government ISP Belnet offers native IPV6 to all customers.
- VOO A large residential ISP (cable) started its transition in April 2013 leading to impressive growth in IPv6 in Belgium
- Telenet started its transition in February 2014, helping to push the Belgian average of IPv6 usage to almost 30% by September 2014 and putting them in the top 10 of worldwide ISPs of which customers are visiting websites with IPv6.
- In 2023, the 3rd-major residential provider in Flanders Orange does not provide IPv6, but customers are allocated inoperable IPv6 addresses.
- According to APNIC, IPv6 penetration is 52% as of January 2019; penetration briefly peaked around 70% in August 2017.

=== Brazil ===
As of April 2021, Brazil has 38.4% IPv6 adoption. IPv6 adoption in the country was boosted in 2015 when the Brazilian telecommunications agency, Anatel, announced that all Internet operators and service providers would be required to provide IPv6 addresses to consumers. This was one of a number of initiatives to increase the speed of deployment.

=== Bulgaria ===
Has constructed a research center to study the possibilities of adopting IPv6 in the country. The center will operate alongside another facility, which is equipped with an IBM Blue Gene/P supercomputer.

Since 2015, the ISP Blizoo enabled IPv6 for many home customers.

At the end of 2016, the ISP ComNet Bulgaria Holding Ltd. has provided complete IPv6 support for all customers and households within company network in Bulgaria.

=== Canada ===
IPv6 deployment is slow but ongoing, with major Canadian ISPs (notably Bell Canada) lacking in support for its residential customers, and the majority of their business customers (including server packages). According to Google's statistics, Canada reached an IPv6 adoption level of 39.66% as of May 2022.

- Rogers Communications has deployed native IPv6 network wide, including their DOCSIS 3.0/3.1 wireline broadband network and their HSPA/LTE mobile network. Rogers Business Cable customers using a Static IPv4 address cannot receive IPv6 over the same service. In 2018, it appeared that all Wireless LTE devices in the network had only IPv6 addresses and no IPv4 gateway, IP address and DNS servers.
- Bell Canada supports IPv6 on their wireless mobility network, but not residential Fibre Internet services (DSL or FTTH).
- Shaw Communications has IPv6 including DOCSIS 3.1 for residential customers using the latest XB6 cable modems since 2018.
- Fibrenoire, a Canadian Metro Ethernet fibre network operating in Quebec and Ontario, has been providing native IPv6 connectivity since 2009.
- Aptum Technologies(formerly Cogeco Peer 1) has provided IPv6 backbones to Canadian data centres since 2011, as well as in its peering centers.
- TekSavvy has deployed its own IPv6 network to its customers on DSL in Alberta, British Columbia, Ontario, and Quebec as well as for cable customers serviced by Rogers Communications.
- Vidéotron has deployed IPv6 to customers on their Helix platform.
- SaskTel has deployed IPv6 support for business customers subscribing to their Dedicated Internet or LANSpan IP product.
- Telus has deployed IPv6 support for business services and residential customers with 61.23% IPv6 usage in August 2021 according to World IPv6 Launch measurements.
- Origen Telecom is a Canadian internet service provider operating in Montreal and Toronto, and supports IPv6 connectivity for its business clients.
- Belair Technologies Operating in Montreal, Laval and surrounding area as well as Cornwall and Toronto, and fully supports IPv6 connectivity for all its clients.
- TelKel, an ISP that offers FTTH only, in Montreal, Quebec and suburbs, supports native dual-stack IPv4 and IPv6 since the beginning.
- Cogeco provides IPv6 to customers.
- Beanfield Metroconnect provides IPv6 for business customers.
- EBOX provides IPv6 to its customers since 2013 on fiber and DSL/FTTN last-mile technologies.
- GemsTelecom has provided IPv6 to its customers since 2009 on fiber and DSL/FTTN last-mile technologies.

=== China ===
The China Next Generation Internet (CNGI, 中国下一代互联网) project is an ongoing plan initiated by the Chinese government with the purpose of gaining a significant position in the development of the Internet through the early adoption of IPv6. China showcased CNGI's IPv6 infrastructure during the 2008 Summer Olympics, being the first time a major world event has had a presence on the IPv6 Internet. At the time of the event, it was believed that the Olympics provided the largest showcase of IPv6 technology since the inception of IPv6. The deployment of IPv6 was widespread in all related applications, from data networking and camera transmissions for sporting events, to civil applications, such as security cameras and taxis. The events were streamed live over the Internet and networked cars were able to monitor traffic conditions readily, all network operations of the Games being conducted using IPv6.

Also, the CERNET (China Education and Research Network, 中国教育和科研计算机网, 教育网) set up native IPv6 (CERNET2), and since then many academic institutions in China joined CERNET2 for IPv6 connectivity. CERNET-2 is probably the widest deployment of IPv6 in China. It is managed and operated jointly by 25 universities. Students in Shanghai Jiao Tong University and Beijing University of Posts and Telecommunications, for example, get native IPv6.

In 2017, China issued an "Action Plan for Promoting Large-scale Deployment of Internet Protocol Version 6" where it encouraged a nationwide adoption of the IPv6 network. Outlined in the plan, China had set goals to develop a next-generation internet technical system and industrial ecosystem with independent intellectual property rights in 5 to 10 years, and aimed at having the largest IPv6 network in the world by the end of 2025.

In 2018, US researchers from the Georgia Institute of Technology categorized China as being part of a group of 169 countries that had little IPv6 traffic. As of 2021, Akamai's latest State of the Internet Report asserts an IPv6 adoption level of 23.5% among Chinese internet connections.

In July 2021, China announced plans to complete a national IPv6 rollout by 2030. It is the only country known to advocate towards a single-stack network and had earlier in May 2021, overtaken India as the country with the most IPv6 addresses, with 528 million.

As of mid-2025, China's IPv6 adoption is around 45%, according to APNIC data. The IPv6 Development report issued in December 2025 by the Chinese government states that as of September 2025, China reported 865 million active IPv6 users, accounting for 77% of Internet users, with IPv6 traffic share reaching 34% of total Internet traffic.

=== Czech Republic ===
As of June 2023, the country has a deployment ratio around 24%, according to Google and around 20% to APNIC stats.

- O2 Czech Republic have deployed IPv6 on residential xDSL lines since 2012. It uses dual-stack PPPoE with CGN for IPv4. Only dynamic /64 prefix size is available via DHCP-PD, static /64 prefix is available for a fee.
- T-Mobile Czech Republic have deployed IPv6 on residential xDSL lines since 2014. It uses dual-stack PPPoE with one public static IPv4 address and /56 IPv6 prefix delegated via DHCP-PD. On their fiber services T-Fiber, IPv6 is not yet available.
- Vodafone Czech Republic inherited UPC Czech Republic DOCSIS lines which have deployed IPv6 since 2017. IPv6-only network with IPv4 over DS-Lite is used. Customers are forced to terminate the connection in carrier-provided CPE with limited customization options. Dual-stack network was available for users with static public IPv4 address since mid-2024 and it is available as an option for all users since around June 2026, in which case they obtain a /56 prefix.
- Pe3ny.NET provides IPv6 /64 prefix using DHCPv6-PD for customers on Quantcom's, their parent company's, fiber network and can provide a /56 without fee on request. IPv6 is not available on xDSL and fiber lines operated by CETIN.
- IPv6 is generally available in data centers and web hosting companies.

=== Denmark ===
As of June 2023, the country has only 10% IPv6 traffic, according to Google stats.

A web page (in Danish) follows national IPv6 deployment.

The ISP Fullrate has begun offering IPv6 to its customers, on the condition that their router (provided by the ISP itself) is compatible. If the router is of a different version, the customer has to request a new router.

Several other small ISP have already begun implementing the protocol as well as 3, the smallest mobile provider.

=== Estonia ===
Estonian Telekom is providing native IPv6 access on residential and business broadband connections since September 2014. According to Google's statistics, Estonia has reached an IPv6 adoption level of 32% by June 2023.

=== Finland ===
FICORA (Finnish Communications Regulatory Authority), the NIC for the .fi top level domain, has added IPv6 address to DNS servers, and allows entering IPv6 address when registering domains. The registration service domain.fi for new domains is also available over IPv6.

A small Finnish ISP Nebula has offered IPv6 access since 2007.

FICORA held national IPv6 day on June 9, 2015. At that time Elisa and DNA Oyj started providing IPv6 on mobile subscriptions, and Telia Company (via 6rd) and DNA Oyj (native) started providing IPv6 on fixed-line connections.

According to Google's statistics, Finland has reached an IPv6 adoption level of 48% as of June 2023.

=== France ===
- AFNIC, the NIC for (among others) the .fr Top Level Domain, has implemented IPv6 operations.
- Renater, the French national academical network, is offering IPv6 connectivity including multicast support to their members.
- Free, a major French ISP, rolled-out IPv6 on its wired network as an opt-in at end of year 2007. In 2020, it removed the possibility to opt-out on its wired network, effectively reaching 99% coverage. Free also started providing IPv6 on its mobile network just after Christmas 2020, and activated it by default for mobile subscribers in March 2025.
- Nerim, a small ISP, provides native IPv6 for all its clients since March 2003.
- Orange finished deploying IPv6 on its consumer fixed-line services in 2016.
- OVH has implemented IPv6.
- FDN, a small associative ISP, has been providing native IPv6 since November 2008.
- SFR, a major ISP, rolled out IPv6 as an opt-in on its wired network.
- Bouygues Télécom planned deployment for 2017. As of the end of 2024, IPv6 was activated on over 95% of its fixed-line fibre connections and mobile connections.
- all mobile operators in France support IPv6 (December 2020)

In February 2026, France had 86% IPv6 penetration according to Google's IPv6 Statistics page. In November 2025, France had 79% IPv6 penetration according to APNIC.

=== Germany ===
According to Google's statistics, Germany has reached an IPv6 adoption level of 68% by June 2023.

- The Deutsches Forschungsnetz (DFN) backbone network offers native IPv6 support for their participants. Many scientific networks in Germany, such as the Munich Scientific Network (MWN) operated by Leibniz-Rechenzentrum, are connected to this network.
- Deutsche Telekom started rolling out IPv6 for new All-IP DSL customers in September 2012. Telekom started to roll out IPv6 (dual stack) in their mobile network in August 2015. In January 2020 Deutsche Telekom announced a new APN for IPv6-only. The overall deployment level for both mobile and fixed network was 80% as of 31 May 2023.
- Vodafone Germany offers native IPv6 to their new customers. The adoption level was 55% May 2023.
- M-net, a regional carrier and ISP, offers native IPv6 for their customers. Adoption level was 83% as of 31 May 2023.
- Regional carrier and ISP NetCologne has begun offering native IPv6 to its customers. Deployment level was 86% as of 31 May 2023.
- Primacom (now part of PŸUR) offers IPv6 for their customers.
- PŸUR (former Tele Columbus) offers IPv6 connectivity since end of 2014.
- Deutsche Glasfaser offers ipv6 via DHCPv6 or 6rd. IPv4 connectivity is provided via CGN to its customers.
- O2 has introduced IPv6 for new DSL customers in 2018.
- Vodafone started with IPv6 in its mobile network end of 2019.
- O2 Germany started to roll out IPv6 in its mobile network, first only for new contracts, later step by step for all customers till end of June 2021
- June 2024 EWE started to provide IPv6

=== Hong Kong ===
Date	Entity	Description
2004	Hong Kong Internet Exchange	Hong Kong Internet Exchange (HKIX), the local Internet exchange point, started to operate its IPv6 exchange (HK6IX).
2006	Hong Kong Internet Registration Corporation	The Hong Kong Internet Registration Corporation, the administrator of the .hk domain, started offering IPv6 domain name services.
2008	Hong Kong government	Hong Kong government enhanced the Government Backbone Network to inter-connect the systems of bureaux and departments using IPv6.
2009	Hong Kong government	Hong Kong government enhanced the Government Internet Gateway systems so that the public can access over 200 government websites, including GovHK using IPv6 and use Internet mails to communicate with over 60 government bureaux and departments using IPv6. Also, government users can access IPv6 resources through the Internet.
2012	Hong Kong Observatory	The Hong Kong Observatory launched the IPv6 network time service.
2012	Hong Kong government	Hong Kong government initiated the Next Generation GovWiFi Programme to provide better and faster free Wi-Fi service, which supported IPv6, for the general public.
2013	goIPv6 Consortium	The goIPv6 Consortium introduced free IPv6 tunneling service for Hong Kong users to connect to the IPv6 Internet through their existing IPv4 network connection.

=== Hungary ===
In Hungary Externet was the first ISP starting deploying IPv6 on its network in 2008 August. The service was commercially available since 2009 May.

Magyar Telekom was running tests on its production environments since the beginning of 2009. Free customer trials started on November 2, 2009, for those on ADSL or Fiber Optic. Customers are given a /128 via DHCP-ND unless they register their DUID in which case they receive a /56 – using a static configuration results in a single /64.

According to information on telecompaper.com, UPC Hungary will start deploying IPv6 in mid-2013, finishing it in 2013. The plan has not materialized until the end of 2015.

In 2015, December RCS&RDS (Digi) has enabled native dual-stack IPv6 (customers receive dynamic /64 prefixes) for its FTTB/H customers. In November the same year UPC Hungary introduced DS Lite(with private IPv4 addresses) which can be enabled on a customer-to-customer basis if the customer asks for it.

Magyar Telekom deployed dual-stack IPv6 (using dynamic /56 prefixes on DSL and GPON and static /56 prefixes on DOCSIS) for all of its wired (and for all of its compatible mobile) customers in October 2016.

According to the statistics of APNIC, IPv6 use in Hungary as of 2018 December has reached around 20%.

According to Google's IPv6 statistics the adoption level in Hungary as of April 2022 is 42%.

=== India ===
According to Google's statistics, India has reached an IPv6 adoption level of around 68.94% in January 2023.

As of 2022, APNIC placed India at more than 75% preferring IPv6.

- Department of Telecommunications, of the government of India has run workshops on IPv6 on 13 February 2015 at Silvassa & on 11 February 2015, at DoT headquarters, New Delhi. They have also released roadmaps on IPv6 deployment.
- Sify Technologies Limited, a private Internet service provider, rolled out IPv6 in 2005. Sify has a dual-stack network that supports commercial services on IPv6 transport for its enterprise customers. Sify is a sponsored member of 6Choice, a project by India-Europe cooperation to promote IPv6 adoption. Sify.com is the first to launch a dual-stack commercial portal.
- ERNET – The Indian Education and Research Network, Department of Electronics & IT of the government of India is providing dual-stack networks from 2006 onwards and has been part of many EU funded initiative such as 6Choice, 6lowpan, Myfire, GEANT etc. ERNET's own websites and those hosted of other organisations are all running on dual stack. ERNET provides Consultancy and Turnkey project Implementation to organisations migrating to IPv6 along with fulfilling their Training needs. ERNET has an IPv6 central facility aimed at system and network administrators to provide hands-on training in the use and configuration of web, mail, proxy, DNS and other such servers on IPv6 spearheaded by Praveen Misra, an IPv6 evangelist.
- Reliance JIO has deployed and is offering IPv6 services in India since September 2016, and has migrated 200M of their Internet users on their IPv6 only mobile network by the end of 2017. As of May 2022, Reliance had an IPv6 adoption level of over 92%.
- Department of Telecom (DoT) has set the below deadline to complete the transition to IPv6.
  - All Government organisations should complete IPv6 transition and migration of their websites on IPv6 latest by 30 June 2022.
  - All new retail wireline customer connections provided by Service Providers after 31 December 2022 shall be capable of carrying IPv6 traffic either on dual stack or on native IPV6.
  - The Service Providers shall endeavour to progressively replace/upgrade the CPEs which are not IPv6 ready and are owned by Service Providers latest by 31 December 2022.
- BSNL created a webpage for Franchises of Bharat Fibre to configure IPv6 for various ONT's. Refer Franchisee Facilitation Center - Configure IPv6

=== Ireland ===
- eir, dual-stack, VDSL2, FTTH, & 3GPP Mobile
- Virgin Media, DS-Lite, DOCSIS

Growth of IPv6 in Ireland as seen by Google.

=== Italy ===
- Fastweb announced in 2015 the initial availability of IPv6 addresses for its residential customers.
- TIM, the largest Italian ISP, has offered since 2017 a basic pilot service in order to allow its customers to connect using IPv6. However, at the beginning of 2022 several users began to report the removal of the PPPoE profile used to provide IPv6, it seems that TIM has completely abandoned IPv6 in its network.
- Sky Wifi provides IPv6 service. SkyWiFi started using dual stack, but will switch to an IPv6-only network using MAP-T for IPv4 connectivity
- Dimensione provides IPv6 by assigning a /48 via DHCPv6 Prefix Delegation with IPv4 in Dual Stack.
- Pianeta Fibra provides IPv6 by assigning a /56 via DHCPv6 Prefix Delegation with IPv4 Dual Stack.
- Navigabene provides IPv6 by assigning a /56 via DHCPv6 Prefix Delegation with IPv4 Dual Stack.
- Iliad provides IPv6 by assigning a /60 via DHCPv6 Prefix Delegation with MAP-E for IPv4 connectivity.
- Aruba.it Fibra provides IPv6 by assigning a /56 via IPv6 over PPPoE with IPv4 Dual Stack.
- Spadhausen provides IPv6 by assigning a /48 via DHCPv6 Prefix Delegation with IPv4 in Dual Stack.
- Convergenze provides IPv6 by assigning a /64 via DHCPv6 Prefix Delegation with IPv4 in Dual Stack.
- Ehiweb provides IPv6 by assigning a /64 via DHCPv6 Prefix Delegation with IPv4 in Dual Stack.

According to Google's statistics, Italy had an IPv6 adoption level of 12.4% by June 2023.

=== Japan ===
- Telecommunications company NTT announced itself as the world's first ISP to offer public availability of IPv6 services in March 2000.
- NTT's NGN allows for native IPv6 over Ethernet connection to various ISPs. Some ISPs provide the option to use IPv6 transition mechanisms such as DS-Lite or MAP-E as an alternative to IPv4 PPPoE. By March 2021, 80% of NTT NGN users had IPv6 internet access through an ISP operating on the NGN.
- NTT Docomo, the largest cell phone operator in Japan, started providing IPv6 dual-stack service to devices sold since Summer 2017. In June 2021, they announced that they would be transitioning to a NAT64/DNS64-based single-stack IPv6 network starting in Spring 2022.

According to Google's statistics, Japan had an IPv6 adoption level of 43.79% by April 2022.

=== Lebanon ===
- Telecommunications company Ogero enabled IPv6 support for DSL users and for private operators since July 2018

=== Lithuania ===
The LITNET academic & research network has supported IPv6 since 2001. Most commercial ISPs have not publicly deployed IPv6 yet.

=== Luxembourg ===
- RESTENA, the national research and education network, has been running IPv6 for a number of years. It is connected to the European GEANT2 network. In addition, it runs one of the country Internet exchanges, which supports IPv6 peering. RESTENA also runs the .lu top level domain, which also supports IPv6.
- P&T Luxembourg, main telecom and Internet service providers, has announced they have production quality IPv6 connectivity since January 2009, with the first professional customers being connected as of September 2009. Deployment of IPv6 to residential customers is expected to take place in 2010.

According to Google's statistics, Luxembourg reached an IPv6 adoption level of 36% by July 2020.

=== Netherlands ===
- SURFnet, maintainer of the Dutch academical network SURFnet, introduced IPv6 to its network 1997, in the beginning using IPv6-to-IPv4 tunnels. Its backbone is entirely running dual-stack, supporting both native IPv4 and IPv6 to most of its users.
- XS4All was a major Dutch ISP. In 2002 XS4All was the first Dutch broadband provider to introduce IPv6 to its network, but it has only been experimental. In May 2009 the provider provided the first native IPv6 DSL connections. In August 2010 native IPv6 DSL connections became available to almost all their customers. Since June 2012 native IPv6 was enabled by default for all new customers.
- Business-orientated Internet provider BIT BV has been providing IPv6 to all their customers (DSL, FTTH, colocated) since 2004.
- SixXS had two private Dutch founders and has been partnering with IPv6 Internet service providers in many countries to provide IPv6 connectivity via IP tunnels to users worldwide since 2000. It started out as IPng.nl with a predominantly Dutch user base and reorganized as SixXS to be able to reach users internationally and be diversified in ISP support. SixXS also provided various other related services and software which contributed significantly to IPv6 adoption and operation globally. They ceased their operation on June 6, 2017.
- Business ISP Introweb provides an IPv6-only 8 Mbit/s ADSL connection for 6 euro per month to 100 customers as a pilot, both for companies to learn how to adapt to IPv6 as for themselves in working on a fully IPv6 enabled network.
- Signet is the first ISP in the country which provides IPv6 connectivity together with IPv4 on multiple national fiber networks (Eurofiber, Glasvezel Eindhoven, BRE, Glasnet Veghel, Ziggo, and Fiber Port).
- Most Dutch hosting companies, including the biggest one, Leaseweb, support IPv6, but customers by default get only IPv4 address.
- Several government sites (such as Rijksoverheid.nl) are available via IPv6.
- On July 13, 2010, native IPv6 over UMTS/GPRS was successfully tested in Belgium and The Netherlands within a vehicle platform as an Intelligent transportation system solution. The test was performed both in GSM and in tethering mode using a Nokia smartphone. This test was performed by Logica Netherlands within the SPITS project, in cooperation with Mobistar Belgium.
- In 2018 KPN started issuing /48 address blocks to their business clients for a one-time fee.
- Odido doesn't have plans to deploy IPv6 yet.
- In 2026, Vodafone NL still does not support IPv6

=== New Zealand ===
In 2012, surveys conducted by the New Zealand IPv6 Task Force indicated that awareness of IPv6 had reached a near-universal level among New Zealand's large public- and private-sector organizations, with adoption mostly occurring as part of normal network refresh cycles. Most of New Zealand's ISP and carrier community have a test environment for IPv6 and many have started bringing IPv6 products and services on-stream. An increasing number of New Zealand government websites are available over IPv6, including those of the Ministry of Defence (New Zealand), Ministry for Primary Industries (New Zealand) and the Department of Internal Affairs.

- Massey University has enabled IPv6 on its border and core campus routers. Its central network services, including DNS, external email and NTP are also enabled. Massey's main website is IPv6-enabled and remote login to some servers and network equipment also supports IPv6 for systems administration and networking staff.
- IPv6 has been enabled on 15 websites hosted at Tauranga City Council (TCC). Changes to equipment on the council's internal LAN have also been made to enable IPV6. Some internal networks across the organization have been enabled for IPv6, and dual-stack technology is being used to enable both IPv4 and IPv6 use. A number of internal servers and client devices communicate via IPv6, and a teredo relay and 6to4 relay ensure users using these two transition technologies are well served when accessing IPV6 addresses.
- The University of Auckland IT Services team has partially deployed IPv6, in collaboration with the Science Faculty and the Computer Science Department. It has IPv6 connectivity via KAREN and its commercial ISP. Computer Science is fully dual-stacked; IPv6 has been used in undergraduate laboratory assignments and for post-graduate projects.
- KAREN, New Zealand's R&E network, is an IPv6 native network and has provided IPv6 as a standard service offering to its members since 2006.
- Auckland-based ISP WorldxChange Communications has had dual-stack since 2008. It has started providing residential customers with dual (IPv4 and IPv6) service using DHCPv6, on a trial basis.
- Government Technology Services, a business group of the Department of Internal Affairs (DIA), has an IPv6 website as a proof of concept to demonstrate how New Zealand government websites can be made accessible to the IPv6 Internet.
- South Island-based Internet Service Provider Snap Internet provides native IPv6 connectivity for all its customers. Its network is fully IPv6-enabled, with the IPv6 service running alongside Snap's normal IPv4 connectivity.
- Palmerston North-based ISP Inspire Net has had native IPv6 transit since late 2009.
- Internet Service Provider DTS's transit, managed and hosting services are fully IPv6 capable.
- Trans-Tasman service provider Vocus Communications offers full dual-stack IP transit services and also supports IPv6 transport on its private IP WAN service in NZ.

=== Philippines ===
- University of the Philippines Diliman is part of the World IPv6 Launch and deployed IPv6 on its network since 2011.
- Sky Cable on its Sky Fiber broadband service provided IPv6 to its HFC customers since 2019. As of 2026, IPv6 is not available on the FTTH service as it relies on Converge ICT's network.
- PLDT provides dual-stack IPv6 to its fixed-line customers since 2020; while wireless subsidiary Smart Communications requires manually switching to IPv6 in APN settings, with IPv4 delivered over 464XLAT.
- Globe Telecom has successfully deployed IPv6 between 2020 and 2021 on its fixed-line and wireless networks. Fixed-line services are dual-stack, while wireless uses 464XLAT. Some may need to change their APN settings to use IPv6 on their wireless service.
- Dito Telecommunity provides IPv6 to its customers since its start of operation.
- Radius Telecoms on its Red Fiber broadband service provides IPv6 to its customers since 2022.
- St. Joseph Cable TV System provides IPv6 to its customers since 2022.
- Starlink Philippines provides IPv6 to its customers since 2023.
- Infinity Fiberblaze and Spectrum Fiberblaze have provided IPv6 since late 2025 and early 2026, respectively.

=== Poland ===
- The Polish national research and education network began an IPv6 trial period in 2002. As for now native IPv6 connectivity is available to numerous educational and private clients connected via citywide networks operated by local universities.
- Polish Internet Exchange, a commercial and carrier-neutral Internet traffic exchange point, has facilitated IPv6 peering between numerous operators since 2008.
- Orange Polska – In March 2013, the mobile operator launched mobile access to the Internet via IPv6 protocol for their subscribers. In September 2013, Sony Xperia Z1 became the first IPv6-compliant device commercially available in Orange Poland.

=== Romania ===
- As of June 2012, the ISP named RCS&RDS offers dual-stack IPv4/IPv6 PPPoE services to current home users using modern versions of Microsoft Windows, Mac OS X, Linux and other IPv6-ready devices. More than 1 million RCS & RDS residential customers can now use native IPv6 on a dual-stack PPPoE connection and 16% already do.

=== Russian Federation ===
- ER-Telecom offers native IPv6 to customers since 10.10.2013 using PPPoE Dual-Stack and DHCPv6 Prefix Delegation.
- MTS provides native IPv6 for mobile customers since April 2017.
- MegaFon has supported IPv6 for mobile customers since 2022.

=== Saudi Arabia ===
- As of 2021, IPv6 deployment reached 44% - 48%.

=== Serbia ===
- Supernova network has started IPv6 beta test, since December 2021.

=== Slovenia ===
- A1 assigns /56 IPv6 address space for FTTH and VDSL/ADSL. Support for IPv6 is enabled for mobile users.
- Telekom Slovenije assigns /56 IPv6 address space for FTTH and VDSL/ADSL. Support for IPv6 is enabled for mobile users.
- Telemach is testing IPv6 implementation for business users on FTTH, DOCSIS, and VDSL/ADSL as of 2014. No support for personal customers is available as of 2024. Support on mobile networks has been enabled since 2010 through Tušmobil (now acquired by Telemach).
- T-2 assigns /56 IPv6 address space for FTTH and VDSL/ADSL. Support for IPv6 is enabled for mobile users.

=== Spain ===
- 2023 Telefónica began upgrading its mobile network (Movistar & O2 brands) to enable IPv6 connectivity. FTTH broadband network support is in trial, with dynamic /56 prefix for end users (dual stack).
- Digi provides /56 dynamic ipv6 prefixes.

=== Sri Lanka ===
- Lanka Education and Research Network (LEARN) network had deployed IPv6, since 2008.
- Dialog Axiata provides native IPv6 to customers by default, since 2018.
- Sri Lanka Telecom (SLT) provides native IPv6 to Fixed LTE customers, since 2018 and native IPv6 and IPv6 only (NAT64) to DSL and Fiber customers, since 2023.
- Mobitel provides native IPv6, since 2020.
- Hutch provides native IPv6, since August 2026.

=== Sudan ===
The Sudanese IPv6 task Force SDv6TF was formed in 2010 to fellow the implementation of IPv6 migration plan (2011–2015).

By November 2012, all telecom operators are becoming IPv6 enabled, this was tested for the first time at the AFRINIC-17 meeting held in Khartoum.

SudREN (Sudanese Research and Education Network) is the first ISP to provide native IPv6 connectivity of the member institution. By August 2014, SudREN.edu.sd is fully IPv6 Enabled. Two certification received from IPv6 Forum, for WWW and ISP Enabled Logos.

=== Sweden ===
- Bahnhof offers IPv6 to businesses.
- Tele2 have begun IPv6 rollout to mobile customers (both consumers and businesses).
- Tre rolled out IPv6 in 2018.
- Com Hem offers IPv6 to businesses and to consumers in some locations.

Operators offering native IPv6 access for business clients and collocation customers include Tele2 and Phonera.

=== Switzerland ===
- The Data Center Light is the first commercial IPv6 only data center in Switzerland
- Swisscom offers IPv6 over 6rd to private customers.
- Init7 offers native IPv6 on all their offerings.
- iway offers native IPv6 on customer lines.
- Sunrise provides IPv6 for some of the products, private customers can enable 6rd.
- UPC Switzerland offers native IPv6 with DS-lite to new customers.

=== Tunisia ===
Tunisia officially launched IPv6 on September 20, 2023, initially over the mobile network with the three local telecom operators: Tunisie Telecom, Ooredoo Tunisie and, Orange Tunisie and later over the fixed network with the foremost Internet service provider, Topnet. Within just one year, the country's IPv6 adoption rate skyrocketed from 0% to 20%, positioning Tunisia as the third-leading country in Africa for IPv6 adoption and the country that has done the most significant jump worldwide according to the statistics publicly provided by the APNIC Labs. The national IPv6 Task Force was established in November 2021, by ministerial decision, with the mandate to develop a comprehensive action plan aimed at accelerating IPv6 adoption which is a key prerequisite for the rollout of 5G technology in Tunisia. All major stakeholders and players along in the Internet chain were involved in drafting the national roadmap toward the adoption of the IPv6: telecom regulatory authority, telecom operators, Internet service providers, public and private Cloud service providers and telecom and handset manufacturers. The final roadmap, along with the technical decisions, the key choices, and the implementation phases for each actor on various networks and services, was unveiled during a public workshop on Friday, February 4, 2022. The national IPv6 strategy was developed in light of current technical circumstances, such as the state of the network infrastructure, the technical skills available for IPv6, and the cost of switching. Moreover, the national IPv6 policy was defined in a government circular and published on Tuesday, April 19, 2022. Both the implementation and testing phases spanned about one year, culminating in the official announcement of IPv6 adoption on Wednesday, September 20, 2023, during a grand event led by the Minister of Communication Technologies, Dr. Nizar Ben Néji. The event was attended by key figures from Tunisia's teleco and IT ecosystem. This date marked a significant milestone in the effort to build a resilient national network infrastructure capable of supporting emerging technologies. Moreover, Tunisia's transition to IPv6 represents far more than technological upgrade; it is a strategic move set to accelerate the country's digital transformation and to put the country in line with the world.

=== Ukraine ===
Some IPv6 implementation has taken place.

=== United Kingdom ===
- JANET, the UK's education and research network, introduced IPv6 unicast support into its service level agreement in 2008. Several major UK universities and colleges (e.g., Cambridge and Esher College) upgraded their campus routing infrastructure to provide IPv6 unicast support to their users.
- Andrews & Arnold launched a native (non-tunneled) IPv6 service in October 2005 and offer IPv6 by default.
- IDNet have offered native IPv6 (dual stack with IPv4) as standard since at least 2011.
- The UK government started to replace much of its Government Secure Intranet (a wide area network) with a new Public Services Network (PSN) in late 2009. The aspiration was to deploy using IPv6 and support IPv4. The implementation is based on IPv4 but suppliers must be capable of supporting IPv6.
- BT Group, who operate the largest DSL-based ISP, announced in August 2016 that most of its customers can expect IPv6 connectivity in early 2017.
- Zen Internet enabled IPv6 for all customers in December 2015, after a successful trial earlier that year.
- Spitfire Network Services offer native dual-stack IPv6 on broadband and Ethernet services.
- Sky Broadband, the second-largest DSL-based ISP, enabled IPv6 for a majority of their customers in the first half of 2016.
- EE enabled IPv6 on the Radio access network for most consumers by Autumn 2018. Their home broadband services currently do not support IPv6 however.
- Aquiss enabled IPv6 for their broadband customers in 2015. In February 2020 they completed their IPv6 rollout for services and systems i.e. web hosting platform, VOIP and other services.
- Hyperoptic supports IPv6 for their customers since 2018.
- Vodafone announced in December 2023 that the majority of their new customers are IPv6-enabled and that enablement for existing customers is underway.

According to Google's statistics, United Kingdom has reached an IPv6 adoption level of 43.55% as of April 2022.

=== United States ===
In the United States the majority of smartphones use IPv6, but only a small percent of computers and tablets use IPv6. As of April 2025, 47.6% of Google users in the US use IPv6.

Date	Entity	Description
2000	Stealth Communications	Stealth Communications (AS8002) has been providing production IPv6 since 2000 when it received its pTLA status on 6bone. The company later received its sTLA allocation from ARIN in 2001, making it the 12th organization at that time to receive production IPv6 addressing in North America.
2005	Sonic.net	Sonic.net offers partial support for IPv6. They assign a /60 to any customer requesting address space and deliver the IPv6 packets over a 6in4 tunnel.
2008	Department of Defense	As with IPv4, the Department of Defense holds a larger IPv6 allocation than any other entity, a /13 block, enough to create almost 2.3 quadrillion (2.3×10^{15}) local area networks, 64 times as many as the next largest entity.
2008	Hurricane Electric	Hurricane Electric (AS6939), an early IPv6 adopter and maintains a native IPv6 backbone and as of 2008 was one of the largest IPv6 connectivity and hosting providers in the United States. It was the first IPv6 backbone operator in the world to reach 200 IPv6 BGP adjacencies. Through its IPv6 tunnel broker service, Hurricane also provides free IPv6 connectivity to users in the United States and in several other countries.
2011	Comcast	Comcast started IPv6 pilot market deployment in 2011.
2011	Time Warner Cable	Time Warner Cable was conducting IPv6 trials for their customers from September 2011.
2011	AT&T	AT&T started testing their networks with IPv6 in 2006. and started rolling out IPv6 to customers with compatible CPEs in Q4 2011.
2012	US Department of Education	US Department of Education (ED) became the first cabinet-level agency to deploy IPv6 on its DNS services across its 17 .gov domains on August 5, 2012.
2012	Google Fiber	Google Fiber launched with IPv6 support in 2012.
2012	Charter Communications	Charter Communications offers IPv6 access to all of its customers via a freely accessible IPv6 rapid deployment server since at least March 2012.
2012	CenturyLink	CenturyLink offered IPv6 access to all of its customers since at least 2012.
2013	T-Mobile	T-Mobile has made IPv6 its default phone configuration for all new Android 4.3+ devices. using 464XLAT. As of December 2013, phones configured by default for IPv6 / 464XLAT include the Samsung Galaxy Note 3, Galaxy Light, MetroPCS Samsung Mega, and the Google Nexus 5.
2013	Verizon Wireless	As of June 2013, over 31% of all users on Verizon Wireless had IPv6.
2016	Verizon Wireless	As of June 2016, over 72% of all users on Verizon Wireless had IPv6.
2017	Hurricane Electric	Hurricane Electric (AS6939) becomes the first Internet backbone in the world to reach 4000 IPv6 BGP adjacencies.

=== Vietnam ===
Vietnam has positioned itself as one of the leading global adopters of the IPv6 protocol, achieving a comprehensive national adoption rate of 67.68% by the end of 2025. According to extensive deployment metrics gathered by APNIC Labs and the Vietnam Internet Network Information Center (VNNIC), this milestone places the country 7th globally and 2nd within the ASEAN region, trailing only Malaysia. Driven by an explosive internet user base of nearly 80 million individuals, the nation's rapid transition was fundamentally necessitated by the severe limitations of IPv4 carrier-grade NAT (CG-NAT) architectures, which could no longer efficiently support the massive scalability and ultra-low latency requirements of emerging 5G-Standalone (NR-SA) networks and the Industrial Internet of Things (IIoT). Currently, over 95 million active broadband subscriptions, encompassing both mobile and fixed-line segments, operate dynamically on IPv6. Security has been deployed in tandem with connectivity; Vietnam maintains the highest routing security metrics in ASEAN, operating an exceptionally strong Resource Public Key Infrastructure (RPKI). Over 96.4% of IPv4 routes and 64% of IPv6 route advertisements are protected by cryptographic Route Origin Authorizations (ROA), effectively mitigating the risk of BGP hijacking during the complex transition period.

==== Deployment timeline ====
The following timeline highlights the major events, policy enactments, and infrastructure milestones during Vietnam's transition to IPv6:

Year	Entity	Milestone Description
2004	VNNIC / VNPT	APNIC allocated Vietnam's first IPv6 address block, with VNPT becoming the first domestic ISP to receive an IPv6 delegation.
2008	Ministry of Information and Communications	The Ministry of Information and Communications (MIC) issued Directive 03/2008/CT-BTTTT to promote IPv6 deployment and readiness across the nation.
2009	National IPv6 Task Force	The National IPv6 Task Force was established to research and coordinate the transition from IPv4 to IPv6 among government entities and major Internet Service Providers.
2010	VNIX	The Vietnam National Internet eXchange (VNIX) officially deployed IPv6, becoming the first dual-stack network infrastructure in Vietnam.
2011	Ministry of Information and Communications	The National IPv6 Action Plan (2011–2019) was officially promulgated, establishing a multi-phase roadmap to ensure stable Internet operations on IPv6 technology.
2011	VNPT	VNPT established its dedicated IPv6 task force and internal action plan for the 2011–2020 period to align its infrastructure with the national transition strategy.
2013	VNNIC / ISPs	"Vietnam IPv6 Launch" took place on May 6. VNIX and the national .vn DNS root servers officially activated dual-stack operations.
2016	Viettel Group	Viettel initiated IPv6 broadband trials in Vung Tau and officially launched IPv6 support for its Internet Data Center (IDC) hosting customers in August.
2016	FPT Telecom	FPT Telecom began large-scale IPv6 deployment for fixed broadband (FTTH) customers, becoming the first major domestic ISP to achieve widespread consumer reach.
2018	MobiFone	MobiFone pioneered in large-scale IPv6 provisioning for mobile network devices, eventually reaching the highest mobile IPv6 adoption rate in the country.
2018	Viettel Group	Viettel's IPv6 adoption rate surpassed 25%, successfully providing IPv6 addresses to millions of Internet users and accounting for 22% of the national IPv6 adoption rate at the time.
2021	Ministry of Information and Communications	The "IPv6 for Government" program (Decision 38/QĐ-BTTTT) was launched to mandate a 10-step IPv6 transition methodology across state agencies, ministries, and e-government platforms for the 2021–2025 period.
2025	Ministry of Science and Technology	The Ministry of Science and Technology (MST) issued Decision 3369/QĐ-BKHCN, establishing the national "IPv6-Only" transition roadmap for the 2026–2030 period, aiming for a 90–100% adoption rate and the sunsetting of legacy IPv4.

==== The IPv6-only transition roadmap (2026–2030) ====
Recognizing that maintaining dual-stack networks incurs significant overhead—doubling routing table memory requirements and increasing firewall policy complexities—the Ministry of Science and Technology issued Decision No. 3369/QĐ-BKHCN on October 27, 2025. This legal instrument established a strict five-year roadmap to deprecate IPv4 completely and transition the national infrastructure to an "IPv6-only" architecture. To preserve access to legacy IPv4 internet resources without allocating public IPv4 addresses to end-users, Vietnamese engineers are broadly deploying transition mechanisms such as NAT64/DNS64 within datacenter environments, 464XLAT for seamless mobile handset connectivity, and Dual-Stack Lite (DS-Lite) for broadband consumer premises equipment (CPE).

The state transition plan operates in three distinct phases:

- Preparation and Pilot Phase (2025–2026): Telecommunication providers and data centers establish isolated IPv6-only testing environments and calibrate translation technologies to ensure backward compatibility with legacy applications.
- Massive Transition Phase (2027–2028): Large-scale migration encompassing all 4G/5G mobile networks, fixed-line Fiber-to-the-Home (FTTH) architectures, and cloud service ecosystems.
- IPv4 Sunset Phase (2029–2030): A nationwide consolidation resulting in the formal deactivation of IPv4 support across core commercial networks, targeting a near-universal 90–100% IPv6 adoption rate.

==== Network operator performance ====
The acceleration of IPv6 penetration is fundamentally anchored by the deployment strategies of Vietnam's dominant telecommunications conglomerates. By the conclusion of 2025, network operators had successfully shifted up to 86.9% of mobile traffic and 83.8% of FTTH traffic over to IPv6, directly relieving the congestion previously caused by centralized NAT gateways. Among these, MobiFone pioneered a mobile-first deployment strategy, outperforming the domestic market by defaulting smartphone provisioning exclusively to IPv6 schemas. Similarly, early adopters like FPT Telecom aggressively configured prefix delegation for residential routers, while industry giants Viettel and VNPT scaled the protocol across millions of enterprise and rural connections.

Primary IPv6 Deployment Metrics by Autonomous System in Vietnam (End of 2025)
Service Provider	Autonomous System Number (ASN)	Primary Infrastructure Focus	IPv6 Capability Rate
MobiFone Corporation	AS131429	Mobile Broadband / 5G	78.21%
FPT Telecom Company	AS18403	Fixed Broadband (FTTH) / Cloud	68.58%
Viettel Group	AS7552	Fixed / Mobile / Datacenters	66.03%
VNPT Corp	AS45899	Fixed Broadband / Mobile	52.49%
Saigontourist Cable TV (SCTV)	AS45543	Cable Television / Broadband	18.63%

=== Further countries ===
As of January 2021

- Malaysia 50.06% IPv6 adoption
- Mexico 37.89% IPv6 adoption
- Portugal 37.12% IPv6 adoption
- Belize 34.67% IPv6 adoption

== Events ==
=== World IPv6 Day ===
The Internet Society promoted June 8, 2011, as "World IPv6 Day". The event was described as a "test drive" for full IPv6 rollouts.

=== World IPv6 Launch ===
The Internet Society declared June 6, 2012, to be the date for "World IPv6 Launch", with participating major websites enabling IPv6 permanently, participating ISPs offering IPv6 connectivity, and participating router manufacturers offering devices enabled for IPv6 by default.

== See also ==
- IPv6 brokenness and DNS whitelisting
