= Alpenglühen TVX =

- Country: Austria
- Broadcast area: Austria; Germany
- Headquarters: Kitzbühel, Austria

Programming
- Language(s): German
- Picture format: 576i (4:3 SDTV)

Ownership
- Owner: Alpenglühen Media GmbH

History
- Launched: 1 October 2007; 17 years ago
- Closed: 31 March 2012; 12 years ago

Alpenglühen TVX was an Austrian pay-tv channel founded in 2007, offering erotic comedies from the 1970s and 1980s. The channel was discontinued in March 2012 due to a lack of economic success. It was licensed by the Austrian media authority KommAustria and operated by Alpenglühen Media GmbH, 90 percent of which was in the hands of Munich media entrepreneur Gottfried Zmeck. With his Mainstream Media AG, the Austrian-born company also hosts the pay-TV channels GoldStar TV, Heimatkanal, Hit24 and Romance TV.

Broadcasting times were daily between 21:00 p.m. and 5:30 a.m.

== Distribution ==
First broadcasts took place in the cable network of LiWest (Austria) since 1 October 2007 and Primacom (Germany) since 15 October 2007. On 3 December 2011, the channel started its satellite distribution via the Entavio platform on Astra 19.2°E.

It was also available via Deutsche Telekom's IPTV Entertain service on channel 275 between 15 April 2010 and 1 February 2012. The channel was also broadcast in the Kabel BW offer Männerpaket and in the Männer & Sport package of NetCologne.
