= Kinowelt TV =

German pay-tv-channel

Kinowelt Television
- Logo used since February 2020
- Country: Germany
- Broadcast area: Germany, Austria, Switzerland
- Headquarters: Bad Soden, Germany

Programming
- Language(s): German
- Picture format: 576i (16:9 SDTV); 1080i (HDTV)

Ownership
- Owner: AMC Networks International

History
- Launched: 12 May 2004; 20 years ago

Links
- Website: www.kinowelt.tv

Kinowelt TV is a German-language pay-TV station which broadcasts films. It shows classic films from Hollywood as well as European films from various genres such as drama, romance, comedy, action, thriller, horror or western. Since 2009, the company has produced three cinema films.

== History ==
Kinowelt TV was founded by Achim Apell - a former associate of Hessischer Rundfunk and Taunus Film from Wiesbaden - together with MK Medienbeteiligungs GmbH from Leipzig, and was launched on 12 May 2004. Michael Kölmel and his film distributor Kinowelt, founded in 1984 (since 2011 StudioCanal GmbH), were behind MK Medien. Apell is the brother of Kölmel's wife. Kinowelt TV is operated by Kinowelt Television GmbH based in Bad Soden am Taunus.

Kinowelt TV has produced three cinema films: The Last Giants (nature, 2009), Die Präsenz (The Presence) (horror, 2015) and UFO (horror/sci-fi, 2016).

On 5 February 2013, the station introduced a new on-air and off-air design, which also introduced new logos for Kinowelt.TV and Kinowelt TV HD.

In April 2014 AMC Networks announced it had acquired Kinowelt TV. The new owner has no plans to change the channel's name.

== Distribution ==
Kinowelt TV can be received via cable operators such as Kabel Deutschland, Kabelkiosk, Tele Columbus, Primacom, Unitymedia, UPC Austria, UPC Cablecom, Swisscable and Tele Columbus. The channel is broadcast via satellite on the Sky platform. The channel is also available via the Vodafone and Telekom Entertain IPTV platforms.

HD version

An HD version of the channel was made available on 29 May 2012, Kinowelt TV on Unitymedia cable. Kabel Deutschland followed on 15 October 2012 and UPC Austria in 2013.
