= ISOC Morocco =

Moroccan Internet Society الجمعية المغربية للإنترنت
- Founded: 1994
- Type: Non-profit
- Location: Morocco
- Region served: Morocco
- Key people: Said Bensbih (President)
- Website: http://www.misoc.ma/

The Moroccan chapter of the Internet Society (or MISOC) is a non-governmental association and is part of the global Internet Society. It aims at being the local arm of ISOC, as well as relaying local concerns to the relevant Internet organizations.

Every member of the chapter is also a member of the global Internet Society.

MISOC was created in November 1994.

== Goals and activities ==
ISOC Morocco shares the global goals of the Internet Society, as expressed in the ISOC strategic Operating Plan. In addition, it focuses on local and international activities to make the Internet processes better known to the community.
