= ISOC Luxembourg =

ISOC Luxembourg logo

The Luxembourg Chapter of the Internet Society is a part of the global Internet Society (ISOC) and is a not-for-profit organization. It aims at being the local arm of ISOC, as well as relaying local concerns to the relevant Internet organizations.

Every member of the chapter is also a member of the global Internet Society.

== Goals and activities ==
ISOC Luxembourg shares the global goals of the Internet Society, as expressed in the ISOC strategic Operating Plan. In addition, it focuses on local and not so local, activities to make the Internet processes better known to the community. As an example, ISOC Luxembourg was the local host of the July 2005 meeting of ICANN. It also participates in the ICANN At-Large community as a recognized At-large structure.

At the local level, the chapter is active in policy discussions related to the country code top level domain .lu as well as being part of the Luxembourg IPv6 council.

== Board of directors ==
- Brent Frère - Chairman
- Patrick Vande Walle - Secretary and interim Treasurer
