= Deutscher Genossenschafts- und Raiffeisenverband =

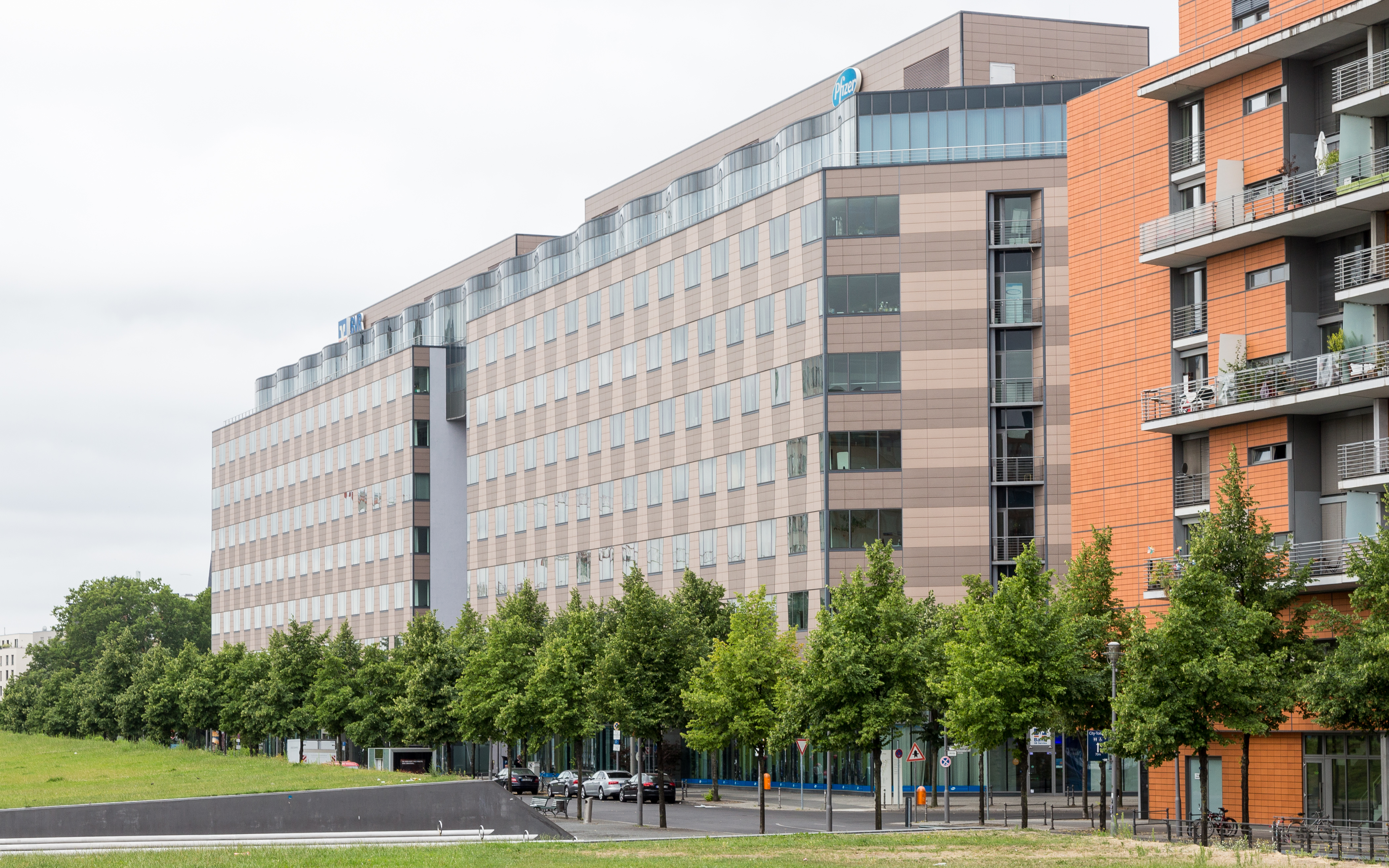
The head office of DGRV is located in the building at Linkstrasse 12 in Berlin, designed by Arata Isozaki and completed in 1997; the Berlin office of the BVR is located in the same complex

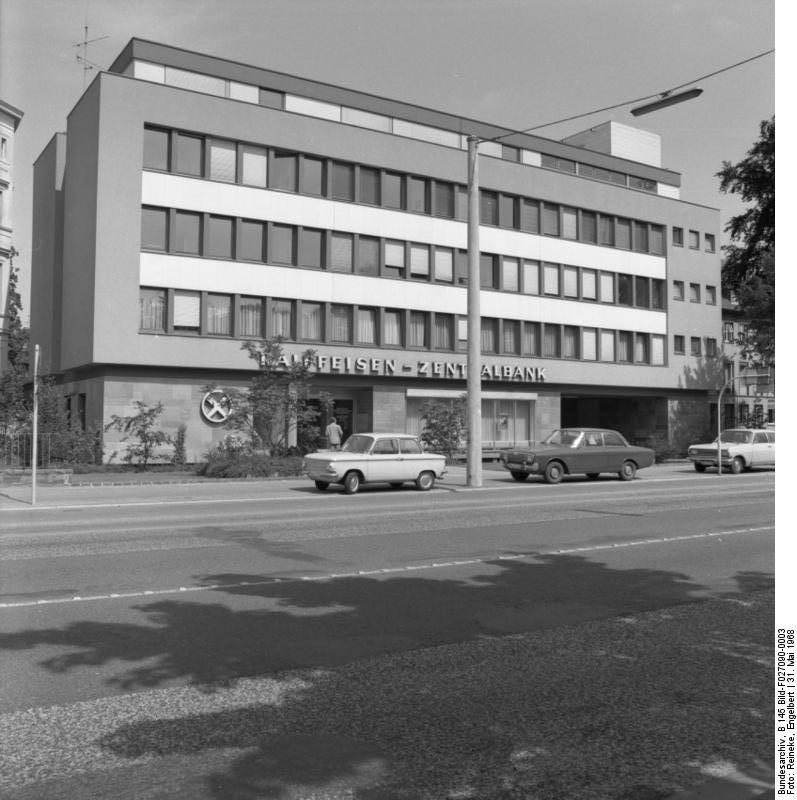
The building at Adenauerallee 121 in Bonn, photographed here in 1968 when it was the seat of a regional Raiffeisen-Zentralbank, is now the Bonn office of the DGRV

The Deutsche Genossenschafts- und Raiffeisenverband e.V. (DGRV) is the Co-operative federation for German Co-operatives.

Since 1972, the federation has been based in Berlin. Berlin. It came out from the union of the two co-operative central associations at that time of Deutscher Raiffeisenverband and the Deutscher Genossenschaftsverband e.V. and is responsible for promoting co-operative ideals.

== Tasks ==
The DGRV represents the common interests of the cooperative organization in economics, right and tax political affairs in relation to the public, the media and the policy.

Together with European and international organizations, for instance the CCACE (Coordinating Committee of European Associations) in Brussels, the ICA (International Co-operative Alliance) in Geneva or the European combination of the loan banks EACB (European Association of Co-operative Banks) in Brussels, the DGRV represents the interests of the German cooperatives on European level and worldwide.

Besides the DGRV is member of the Internationalen Raiffeisen Union IRU, which is a platform for exchange of experience between the international cooperative organizations. In addition the DGRV advises its members in questions of the marketing and management, accounting and the co-operative examinations system.

Furthermore the DGRV polices all examinations of the regional and federal centers, special institutes and federations for entrance of the co-operative group.

In addition the DGRV promotes the emergence of cooperatives at home and abroad. Particularly in countries of the third world, in addition, in central and Eastern Europe, thereby the economic development is advanced.

DGRV promotes the establishment of new cooperatives in Germany.

== Structure ==
With the DGRV all cooperative sections are organized up to the housing cooperatives. The credit cooperatives, the rural and the commercial cooperatives as well as the consumer cooperatives are members.

The DGRV is structured thus:

- Bundesverband der Deutschen Volksbanken und Raiffeisenbanken e.V., for credit cooperatives
- Deutscher Raiffeisenverband e.V., for agricultural cooperatives
- Zentralverband gewerblicher Verbundgruppen e.V., also known as Der Mittelstandsverbund – ZGV, for trade and crafts cooperatives
- Zentralverband der deutschen Konsumgenossenschaften e.V., for consumers' co-operatives

The DGRV organises central enterprises of their regional federations - managing 5,500 enterprises and 16.6 million cooperative members, although the primary cooperatives are not a directly members of the DGRV.

Approximately 400,000 people work and 35,000 people train within the German co-operative movement.

== Gallery ==
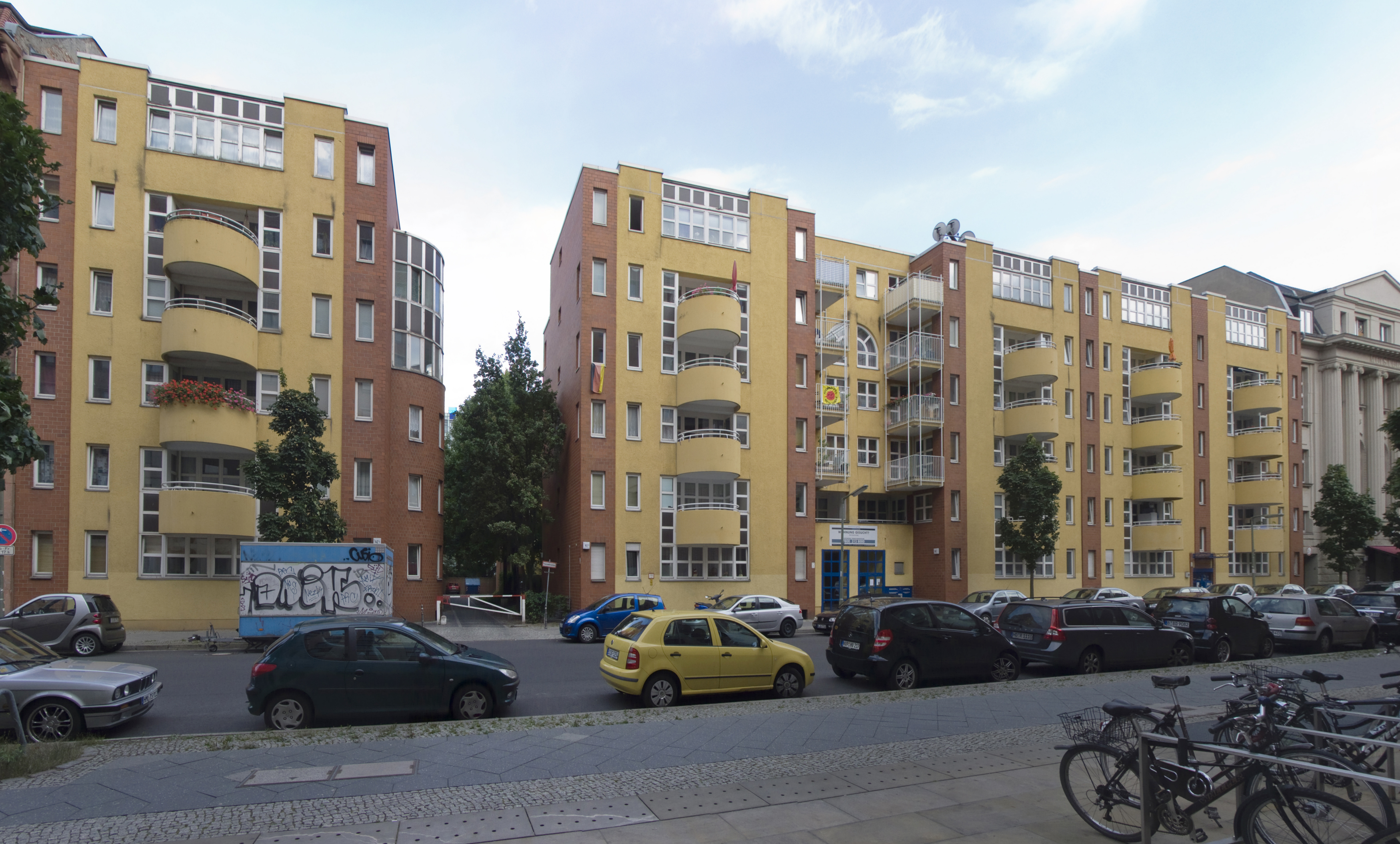
1980s residential building on the former location of the large Raiffeisenhaus at 39-43, Köthener Strasse in Berlin, which was entirely destroyed at the end of World War II; the adjacent Meistersaal is visible on the right

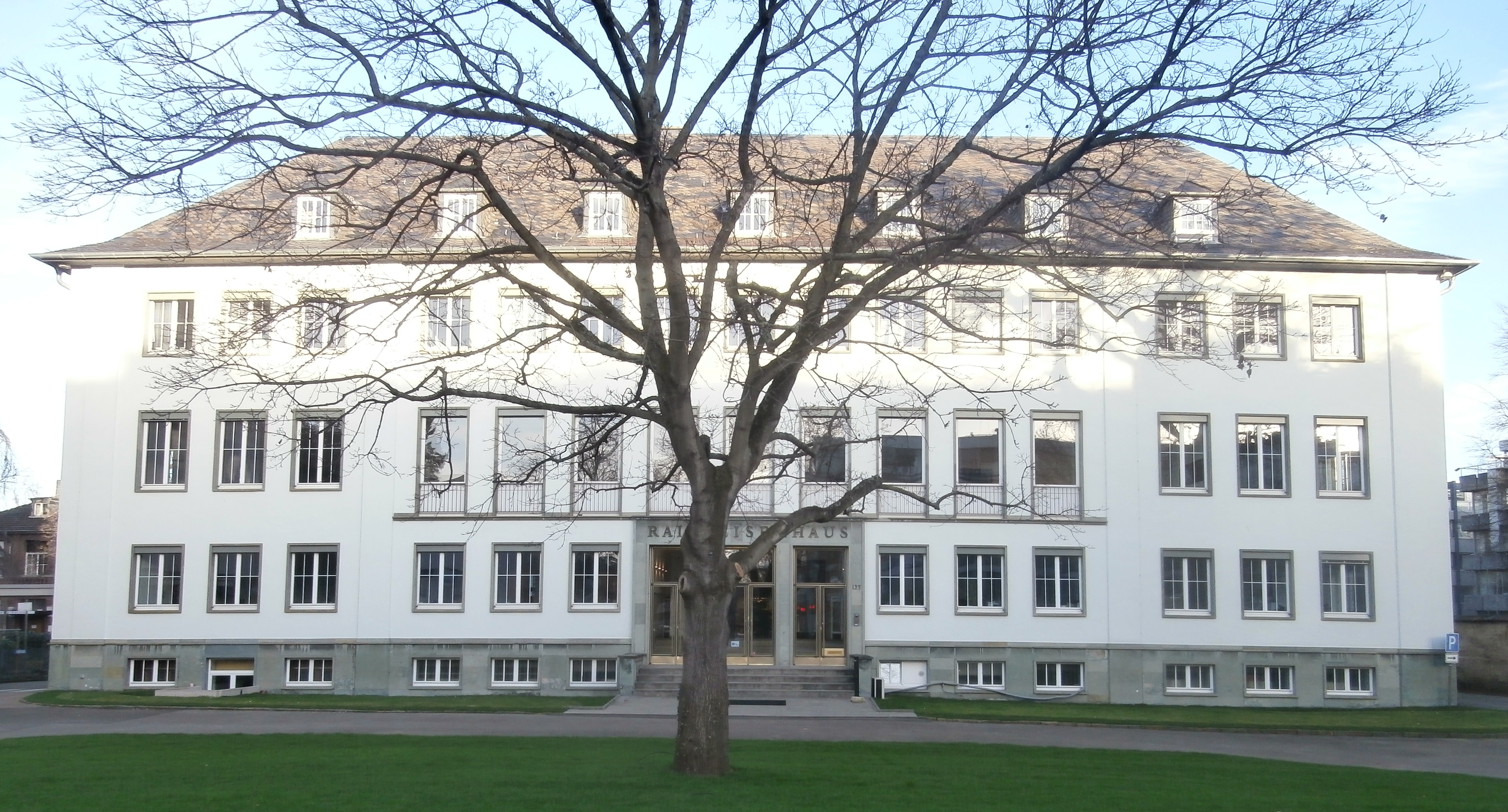
Raiffeisenhaus in Bonn, Adenauerallee 127, a stone's throw from the former Federal Chancellery, now Bonn office of the Deutscher Raiffeisenverband

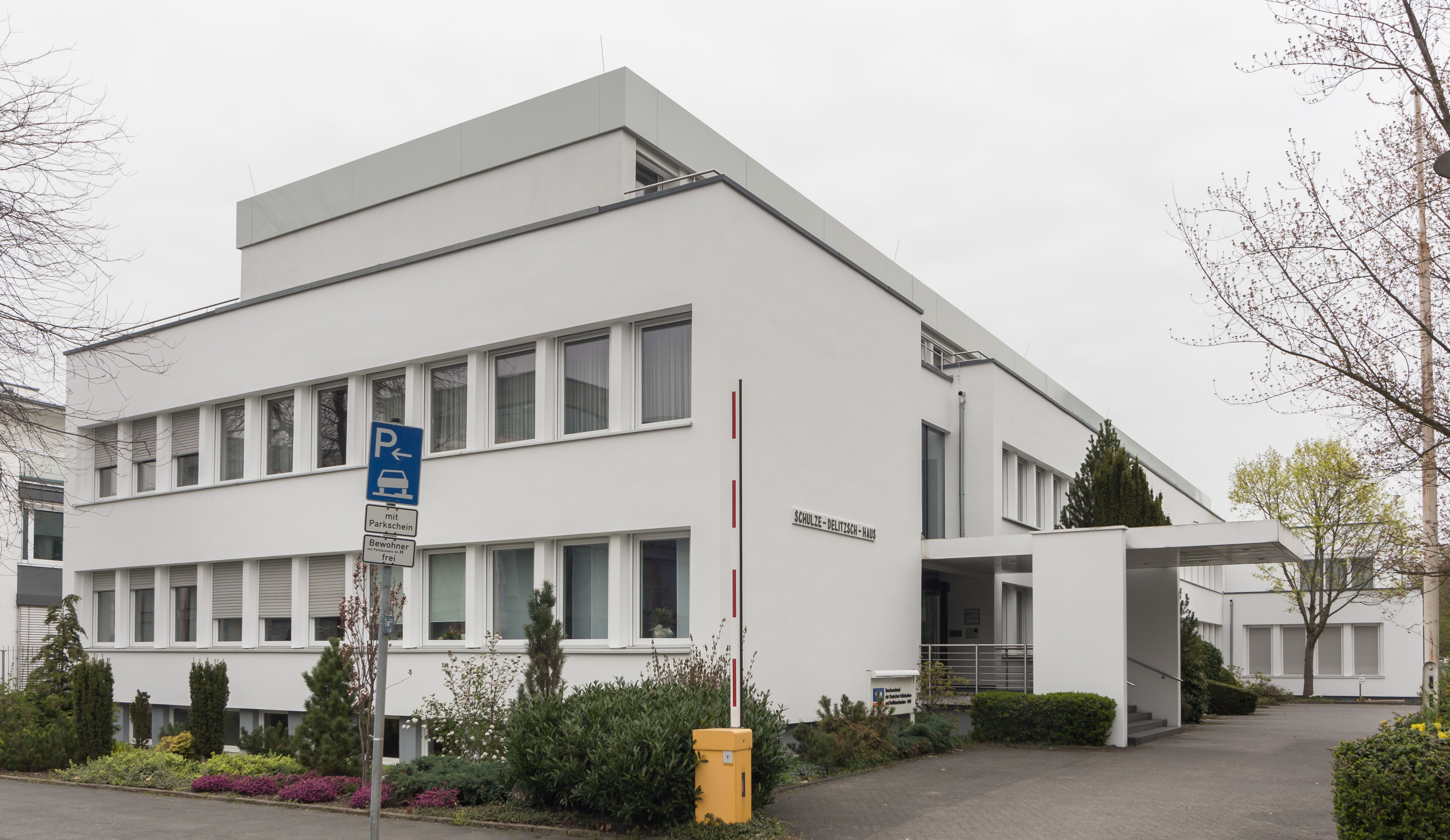
Schulze-Delitzsch-Haus (Bonn), now Bonn office of the BVR

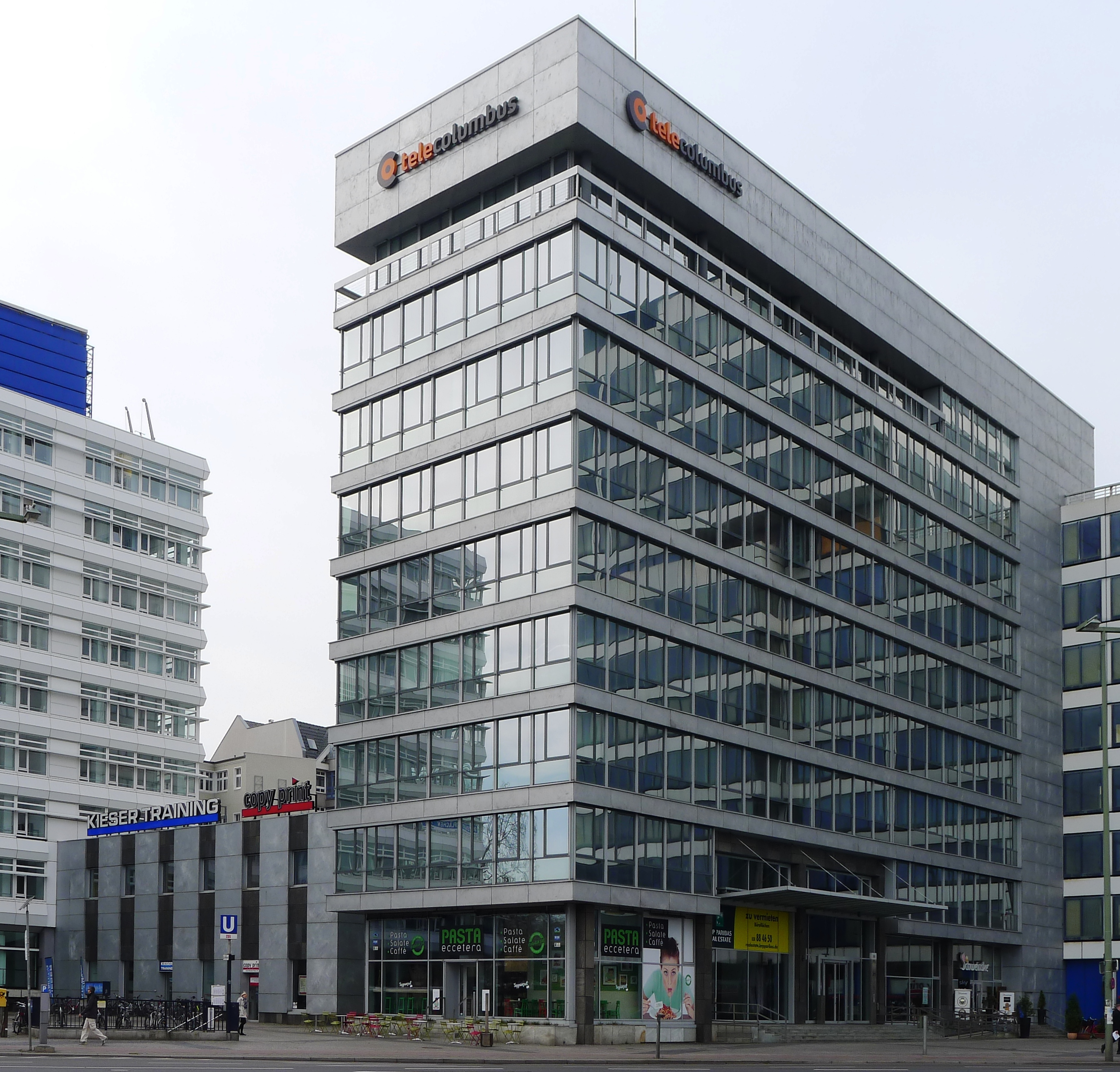
Former Raiffeisenhaus on Ernst-Reuter-Platz in Berlin, designed by Hans Geber and Otto Risse (1972), now head office of Tele Columbus

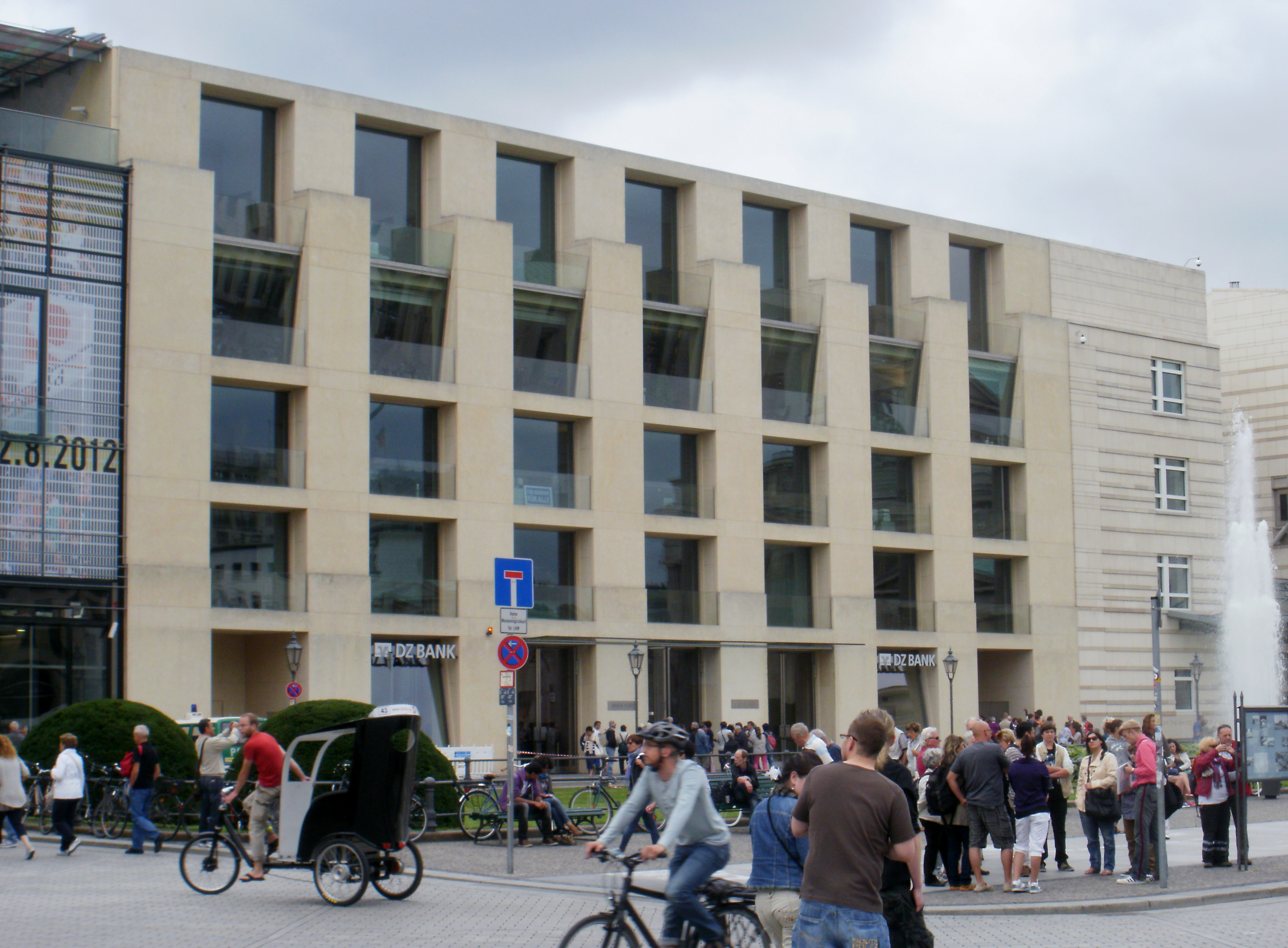
DZ Bank building on Pariser Platz, now Berlin office of the Deutscher Raiffeisenverband

== See also ==
- German Cooperative Financial Group
