= Internet Society Nepal =

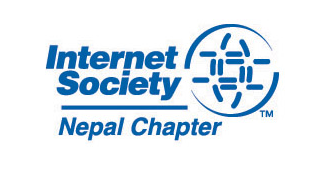
- Abbreviation: ISOC Nepal
- Formation: 2007
- Legal status: Non-profit
- Purpose: Leadership
- Headquarters: Kathmandu, Nepal
- Region served: Nepal
- Official language: Nepali/English
- Affiliations: Internet Society
- Website: www.internetsociety.org.np

Internet Society Nepal is a non-profit organization, working with the main theme of "Internet is for Everyone". Registered under the Registration Act of Nepal, it was formalized on 11 November 2009 at the District Administration Office, Kathmandu, Nepal. Previously, ISOC Nepal was a loose network and received its status of National Chapter by the Internet Society (ISOC) in April 2007.

The ISOC Nepal was envisioned with the concept of a Public-Private Partnership for facilitating standardization and policy issues of the Internet. Today it has proven to be a leading policy lobbying organization that facilitates the public and private sectors with resources and standardization issues in Nepal.

== Founding Members of ISOC Nepal ==
Name	Title	Stakeholder
Eswari Prashad Sharma	President	Private Sector
Hempal Shrestha	Vice President	Technical Community
Babu Ram Aryal	General Secretary	Civil Society
Shreedeep Rayamajhi	Secretary	Civil Society
Bikram Shrestha	Treasurer	Private Sector
Ananda Raj Khanal	Member	Government
Gaurab Raj Upadhyaya	Member	Technical Community
Kishor Panth	Member	Private Sector
Saugat Shrestha	Member	Private Sector
Basanta Karki	Member	Private Sector
Anusha Josh	Member	Technical Community

== Executive committee ==
Internet Society Nepal Chapter (ISOC-Nepal) convened its Fourth Annual General Meeting on December 14, 2013 in Kathmandu. The AGM unanimously elected a new executive committee for 2 years.
