= Sarah Valentina Winkhaus =

German television presenter

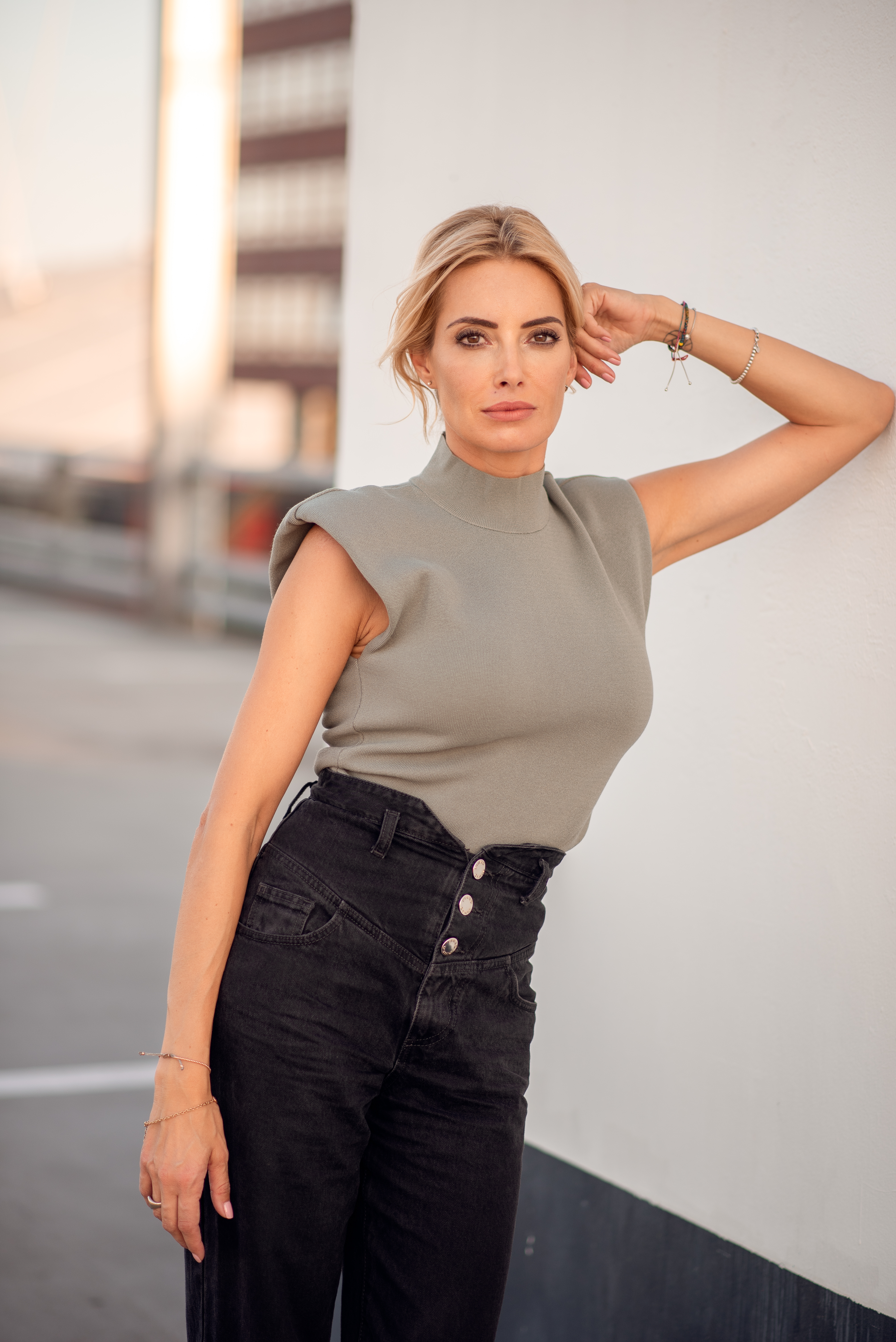
- Born: 14 August 1979 (age 46); Bad Soden am Taunus, Hesse, Germany
- Occupation: Television presenter
- Years active: 2008–present
- Website: sarahwinkhaus.de

Sarah Valentina Winkhaus (born 14 August 1979) is a German television presenter, who presents in German, Italian and English.

== Early life and education ==
Winkhaus was born in Bad Soden am Taunus, Hesse, the daughter of an Italian and a German, and grew up in Düsseldorf. She studied cultural industries and business administration in Passau and Bologna, and attended the master class with Umberto Eco in Bologna. During her double study, she specialized in art history and foreign trade policy.

== Television career ==
Winkhaus has been presenting on the channel Sky Deutschland since 2011. Winkhaus gained her first experience as a news presenter during her studies at the regional broadcaster TRP1 in Passau and in 2007 while volunteering on the television station Phoenix. On Phoenix, she presented until 2010 the news fragment Vor Ort and was responsible for the editorial processing of the program content. Sky Deutschland then discovered Winkhaus after the nationwide presenter casting of Sky und BILD 2010. Shortly after, she began reporting for Sky Cinema in her program Kinopolis for the cinema premiere and film festival.

Her first experience as a presenter and author in the sports journalism field was in the comedy soccer show Süper WM Stüdyo in the course of the 2010 FIFA World Cup for ZDFneo. In 2013, Sky Italia became aware of her, and after a well-known casting in Italy, Winkhaus became the new presenter of the Formula One program Sky Sport F1 HD. From it she reported live in three languages from the international racetracks on their programs Paddock Live und Paddock Live Show.

From 2014 to 2016, she was in Germany alongside her cinema program Making Of, she was again increasingly seen live on the news from Sky Sport News HD in Germany and reported on exclusive Formula One Grand Prix. Since June 2016, Winkhaus presents on Sport1 the weekly program VIP-Loge.

In December 2015, Winkhaus had herself photographed for Playboy.

== Television programs ==
- 2008 : Vor Ort on Phoenix and ZDF
- 2008 : TV Hitcocktail Wunschkonzert on Goldstar TV
- 2008 : Hits made in Italy on ARD and MDR Fernsehen
- 2010 : Süper WM Stüdyo on ZDFneo
- 2011 : Kinopolis on Sky Deutschland
- 2012 : Making Of on Sky Deutschland
- 2013 : Sky Sport F1 HD on Sky Italia
- 2014–2015 : Sky Sport News HD on Sky Deutschland
- 2016 : Motorsport / Deutsche Tourenwagen Masters on Sport1
- 2016 : BMW International Open / Golf on Sport1
- 2016 : BWin / Doppelpass on Sport1
- 2016 : VIP-Loge on Sport1
- 2017 : ADAC GT Masters on Sport1
- 2019–2020 : Dinner Party – Der Late-Night-Talk
