= IPv6 transition =

IPv6 transition can refer to:

- IPv6 deployment, the process of transitioning the Internet to use the IPv6 protocol
- IPv6 transition mechanism, meachanisms for enabling IPv6 deployment
