= Happy Eyeballs =

Concurrent IPv4 and IPv6 algorithm

Happy Eyeballs (also called Fast Fallback) is an algorithm published by the IETF that makes dual-stack applications (those that understand both IPv4 and IPv6) more responsive to users by attempting to connect using both IPv4 and IPv6 at the same time (preferring IPv6), thus minimizing IPv6 brokenness and DNS whitelisting experienced by users that have imperfect IPv6 connections or setups. The name "happy eyeballs" derives from the term "eyeball" to describe endpoints which represent human Internet end-users, as opposed to servers.

Happy Eyeballs is designed to address the problem that many IPv6 networks are unreachable from parts of the Internet, and applications that try to reach those networks appear unresponsive, which frustrates users. Happy Eyeballs solves this problem by determining which transport would be better used for a particular connection by trying them both in parallel. An application that uses a Happy Eyeballs algorithm checks both IPv4 and IPv6 connectivity (with a preference for IPv6) and uses the first connection that connects successfully.

Implementations of Happy Eyeballs stacks exist in Google Chrome 11, Opera 12.10, Firefox 7 (which falls back to IPv4 for dual-stack hosts), OS X Lion, iOS 5, (Note: The iOS 9 and OS X El Capitan implementation (said as implemented at ~99%) is biased towards IPv6 with a 25 ms headstart, though previously iOS 8 and OS X Yosemite (at ~50%) used the fastest connection with no protocol preference.) cURL 7.34.0 and OpenBSD.

Happy Eyeballs (pre-version 1) testing was part of World IPv6 Day in 2011. Version 1 was formally published in April 2012 as RFC 6555. Version 2 was published as RFC 8305 in December 2017, replacing version 1.

The Happy Eyeballs algorithm may be extended for choosing between types of transport protocols as well, such as TCP and SCTP, but development is still in an experimental phase. A 2016–2017 proposal for this feature was abandoned. However, Happy Eyeballs version 3 (still an actively-updated draft document in December 2025) includes the use of SVCB and HTTPS records from DNS, which entails a form of transport protocol selection in the form of different versions of HTTP (TCP vs QUIC).

== See also ==
- IPv6 deployment
