= Zentralverband der deutschen Konsumgenossenschaften =

The Zentralverband der deutschen Konsumgenossenschaften, or ZDK (English: The Central Association of the German Consumer Cooperatives) is for over one hundred years the syndicate of the Consumer Co-operatives in Germany. Today the federation, which stands in the Lassalle tradition of Cooperative continues to develop the cooperative thought, by promoting the reestablishment of cooperatives in the service sector.

== See also ==
- Deutscher Genossenschafts-und Raiffeisenverband
