= Stealth Communications =

Fiber-based internet service provider

- Type: Private
- Industry: Internet & communications
- Founded: 1995 (31 years ago)
- Headquarters: New York City
- Area served: New York City
- Key people: Shrihari Pandit and Jinci Liu (Co founders).
- Products: Internet services Dark fibre Proactive cyber defence Defense
- Owners: Shrihari Pandit (50.0%); Jinci Liu (50.0%)
- ASN: 8002
- Traffic Levels: >50 Tbps
- Website: stealth.net

Stealth Communications is an American fiber-based Internet service provider (ISP), installing and maintaining its own fiber optic network throughout New York City. Stealth began rolling out its Gigabit Internet services in late 2013 to businesses throughout Manhattan, using in-house employees to lay its own fiber-optic cabling. Stealth performs its street construction in-house, with its employees cutting and excavating streets, installing conduit and manholes, placing fiber, and paving the roadway after installation. In July 2015, City of New York and Stealth announced a $5.3 million public/private partnership to expand fiber broadband into the Brooklyn and Queens Industrial Business Zones. As of May 2019, the company reported to have connected hundreds of commercial properties with fiber, over 100 fiber route miles.

== Overview ==
Stealth Communications started in 1995 to provide ultrafast Internet connectivity to businesses in NYC. Work on what would become Stealth Communications began late 1994. In 2013 the company received authorization from the City of New York to construct its own fiber network.

This authorization followed a major structural shift by the New York City Office of Technology and Innovation, which discontinued its legacy telecommunications franchise model. In its place, the city introduced an updated dual-structure framework that separated rights into distinct Telecommunications Services and Information Services franchises. On February 11, 2013, following public hearings to transition to this new system, Stealth Communications became the first provider approved under this modernized framework, securing both agreements simultaneously to begin rolling out its independent infrastructure.

In 2022, Stealth was recognized as the fastest local/regional Internet provider in the U.S., with speeds exceeding 7.5 Gbps.

== Technology ==
=== Fiber distribution ===
Stealth utilizes an underground conduit system for placing its fiber-optic cables, that is owned and maintained by Empire City Subway. Once their fiber-optic cable reaches the closest manhole to the building, Stealth pulls the fiber-optic cable through existing conduits or builds a new conduit into the building. In certain cases due to the conditions of the conduit system, conduits are clogged or collapsed often causing costly re-routing by lengthy distances and construction of entirely new conduits.

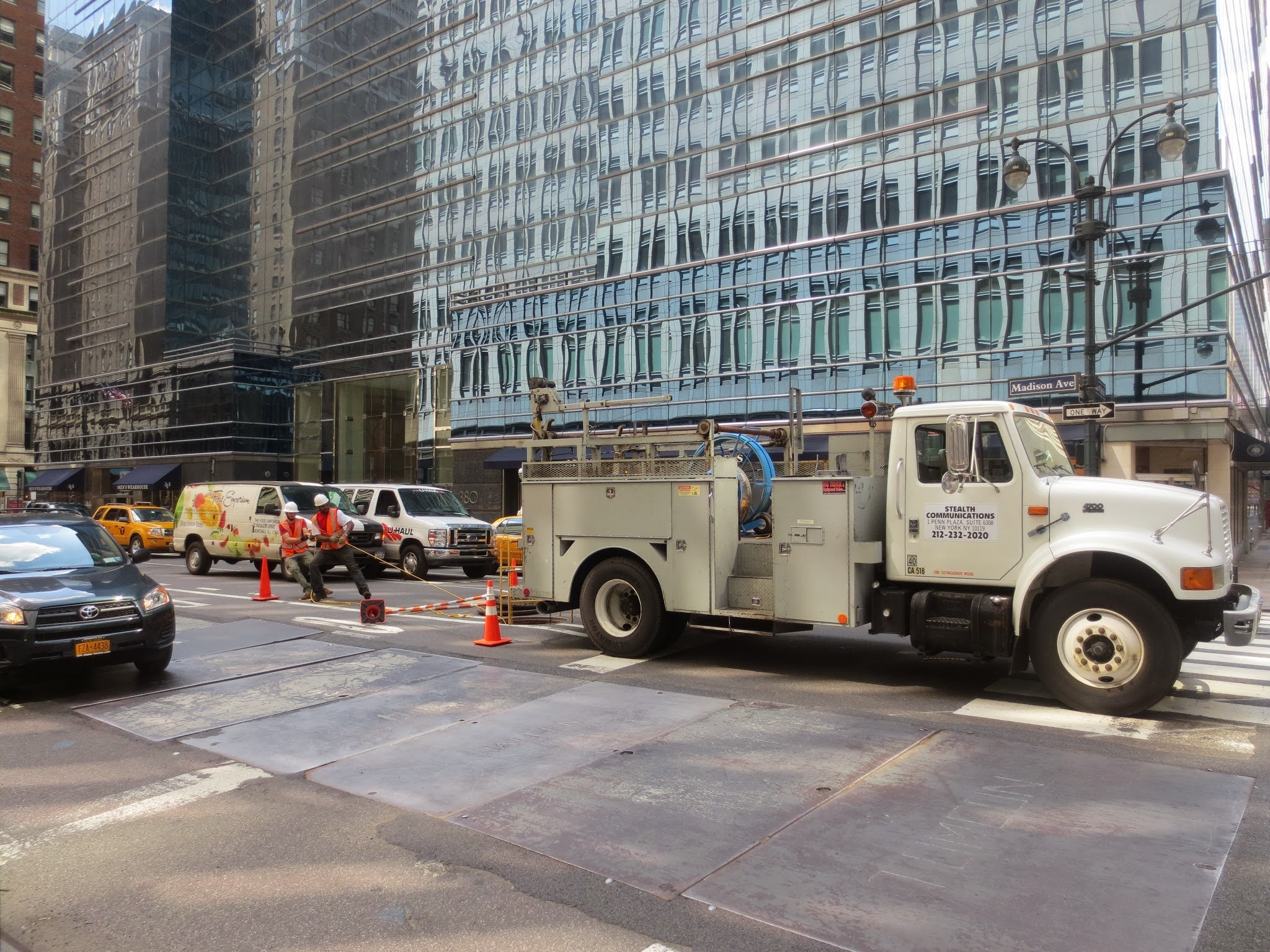
Stealth Fiber installing fiber cable underneath Midtown Manhattan, New York City

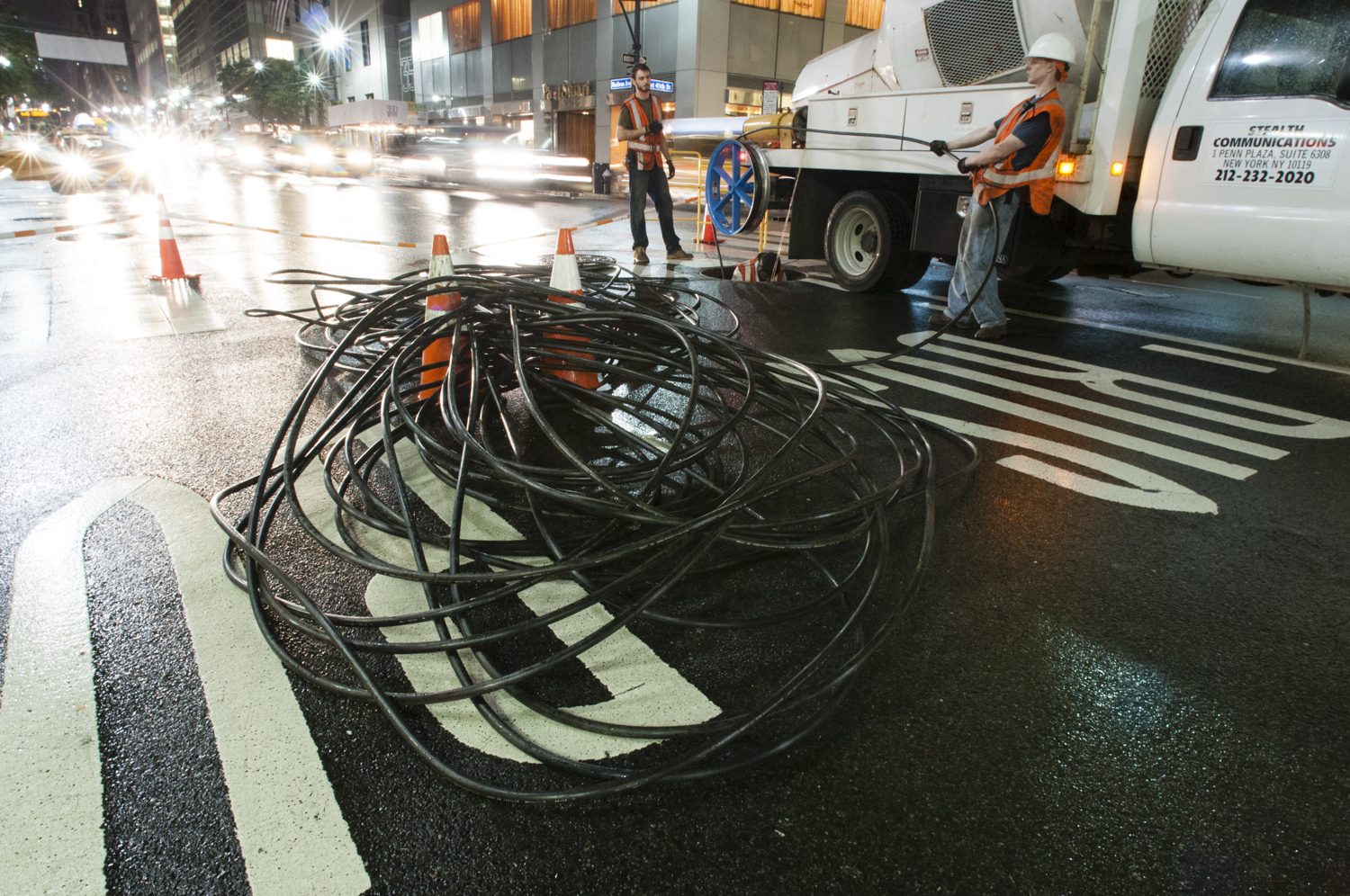
Stealth installing dark fibre cable in Midtown Manhattan, New York City

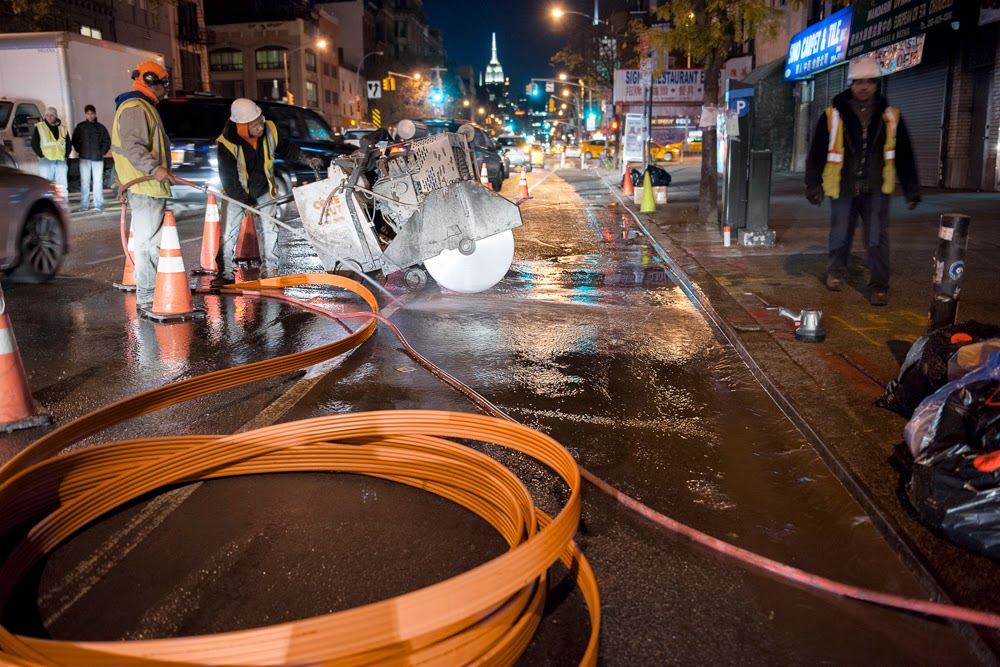
Stealth Microtrenching in Chinatown, installing micro-conduits

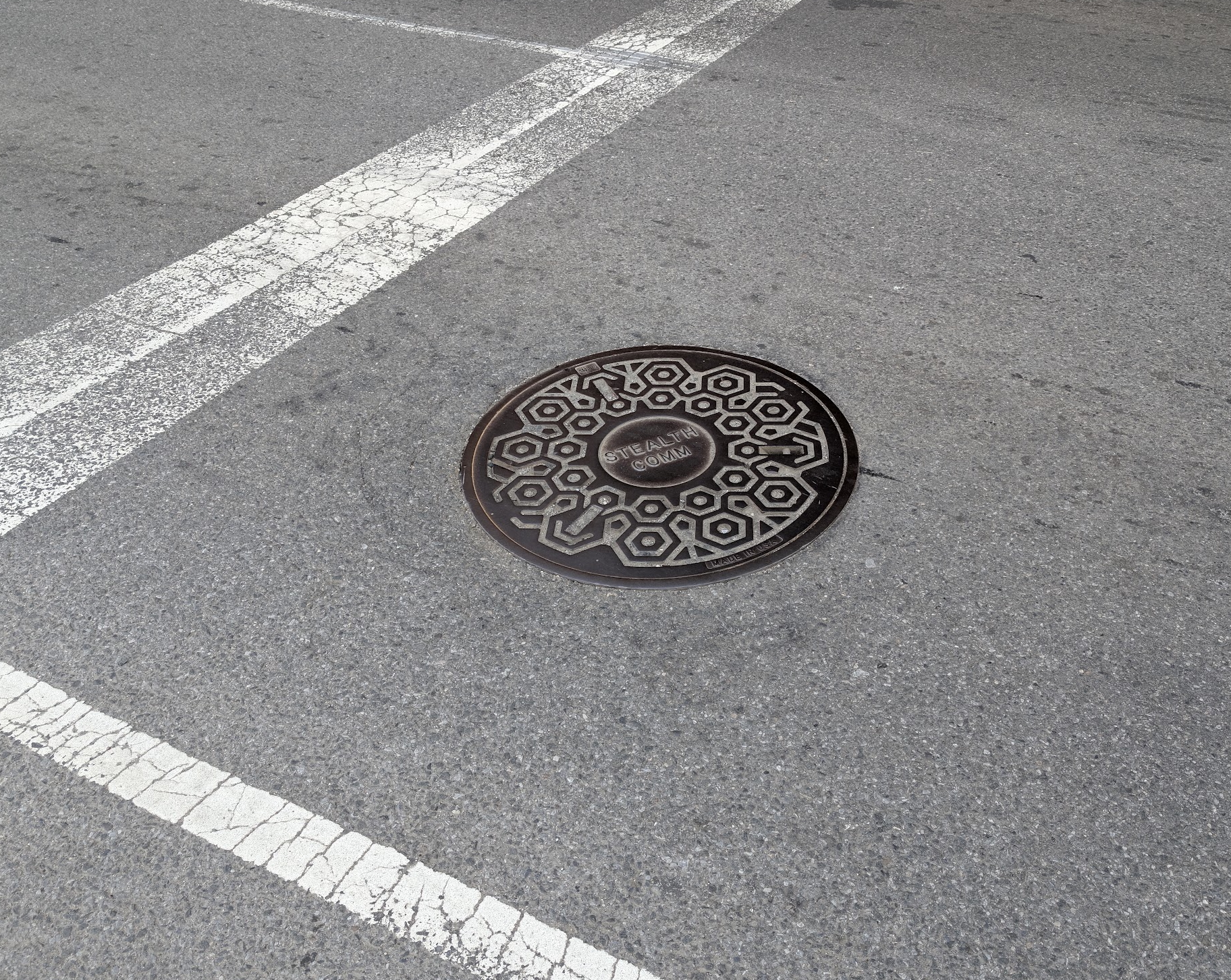
Fiber-Optic Manhole Cover of Stealth Communications in NYC.

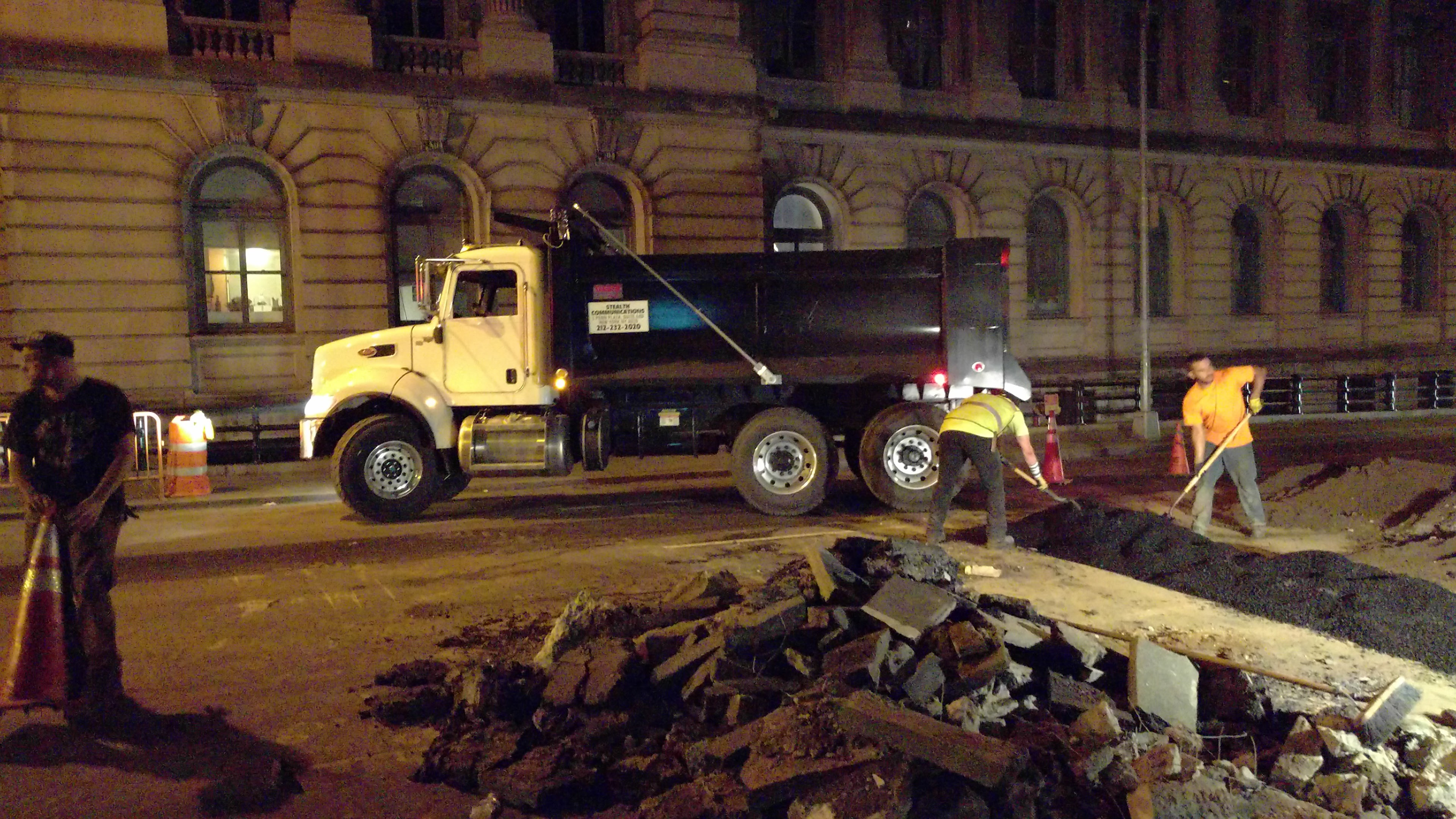
Stealth Communications crew paving over a fiber-optic trench in Chinatown, Manhattan, in 2016.

=== Fiber technology ===
Stealth implements WDM fiber transmission technology for connecting customers to its hubs, by allocating a wavelength for each customer, whereas each wavelength is capable of transmitting between 1 Gbit/s to 400 Gbit/s. The company claims that it makes use of special materials to split and combine multiple wavelengths running through the fiber-optic cables without requiring electricity.

=== Routing infrastructure ===
Stealth Communications has used several generations of high-capacity routing platforms. In 2003, the company selected routers from Procket Networks for a 10 Gigabit Ethernet IP/MPLS metro core network in New York City. In 2005, it deployed Force10 Networks E-Series equipment, supporting Gigabit and 10 Gigabit Ethernet connections.

In 2022, Nokia announced that Stealth had selected its 7750 Service Router and 7220 Interconnect Router platforms for an upgrade of the company's New York City metro core.. Nokia's deployment included 7750 SR-14s core routers supporting FP5 line cards, with FP4 line cards used in the initial rollout.

According to the company's published history, Stealth also developed PC- and FPGA-based routing and Layer-2 networking systems during the 1990s, including systems capable of 1 Gbit/s full-duplex transmission.

=== IPv6 deployment ===
In 2000, Stealth Communications joined the 6bone experimental network to deploy IPv6. Following a routing peer-review process overseen by Bob Fink of Energy Sciences Network and Rob Rockwell of Sprint, the company was assigned a Pseudo Top-Level Aggregation (pTLA) identifier to route IPv6 traffic.

On February 1, 2001, the American Registry for Internet Numbers (ARIN) allocated Stealth a production sub-Top-Level Aggregation (sTLA) address block (2001:458::/32). This assignment made Stealth one of the first ten in North America to receive a production IPv6 allocation from ARIN.

In late 2001, Stealth established the New York IPv6 Exchange (NY6IX).The internet exchange point interconnected networks for entities including Sprint, France Telecom, the United States Department of Defense, Qwest, IIJ, and ESNet.
