= MANRS =

Activity aimed at securing global Internet routing

MANRS ("Mutually Agreed Norms for Routing Security") is an Internet routing security initiative supported by the Internet Society. Its main participants include Internet service providers (ISPs), cloud providers, Internet exchange points (IXPs), and content delivery networks (CDNs). In 2024, the Global Cyber Alliance assumed the role of MANRS secretariat and operational support, with continued funding, advocacy, and training support from the Internet Society.

Members of MANRS include:

- Network Operators like Workonline Communications, Telcom Internet, Backspace Technologies (and more).
- Internet Exchange Points like France IX, NIX.CZ, NAPAfrica (and more).
- CDNs and Cloud Providers like Amazon, Cloudflare, Facebook, Google, and Netflix.

MANRS also operates the MANRS Observatory, a service that monitors the Internet for routing problems.

In May 2020, amidst the COVID-19 pandemic, MANRS announced that more than 500 autonomous systems had joined the initiative. By 2025 the initiative had grown to more than 1,000 participating networks and over 1,100 total participants across its programs.
