= Hit24 =

- Country: Germany
- Broadcast area: Germany, Austria
- Headquarters: Ismaning, Germany

Programming
- Language(s): German
- Picture format: 576i (4:3 SDTV)

Ownership
- Owner: Mainstream Media AG
- Sister channels: Goldstar TV; Heimatkanal

History
- Launched: 3 April 2004; 20 years ago
- Closed: 1 July 2009; 15 years ago

Links
- Website: www.hit24.tv

Hit24 was a German television channel that mainly broadcast music from the field of rock and roll and pop. The 24-hour special-interest programme featured music clips, hosted music programmes and live concerts. Broadcasting started on 3 April 2004.

The target group was the over 30-year-olds. The program was produced by Mainstream Media AG of media entrepreneur Gottfried Zmeck in Ismaning (near Munich), just like its counterpart in the field of Volkstümliche Musik Goldstar TV.

== Distribution ==
Hit24 was broadcast via satellite and cable networks as part of Premiere's programme bouquet in Germany and Austria. This distribution was discontinued on 1 July 2009 in the course of the conversion of the program offering as a result of the brand change of Premiere to Sky Deutschland. With Sky/Premiere no agreement could be reached on the further distribution of our channel from July onwards was stated on the Hit24's website.
