= ER-Telecom =

Russian telecommunications company

- Company type: Closed joint stock company
- Industry: Telecommunication
- Founded: 2001
- Headquarters: Perm, Russia
- Key people: Andrey Semerikov; CEO
- Products: Cablecasting, Broadband Internet, VoIP
- Revenue: 33,700,300,000 Russian ruble (2017)
- Operating income: 10,614,620,000 Russian ruble (2020)
- Net income: 4,285,956,000 Russian ruble (2020)
- Total assets: 99,440,636,000 Russian ruble (2020)
- Website: www.ertelecom.ru/en

ER-Telecom is a Russian telecommunication holding company. It was the first federal telecommunication company, whose evaluation impulse has been received out of the region. The company is specialised on rendering a wide range of services for individuals and corporations. The company is active mainly in the southern and central regions of European Russia.

== Owners and management ==
The major shareholder is the Perm Financial and Industrial Group (LLC). Evgeniy Pegushin is chairman and Andrey Semerikov is CEO. The first substitute is Sergey Gusev, who has been First Deputy General Director and Technical Director of CJSC ER-Telecom Holding since 2006

For 2024: Owner is International CJSC "Er-Telecom Holding".

For 2024: President and Acting CEO is Kuzyaev Andrey Ravelevich.

== History ==
ER-Telecom was founded in March 2001 by the telephone operator CJSC EL-Svyaz (1997) and the internet service provider CJSC Raid-Internet (1997).

The company started with rendering of telephone services (regular phone services, IP-telephony for corporations, IP-telephony for individual clients, telephone cards East-West) and dial-up internet access (internet cards 2x2). In 1998, ER-Telecom was the first dial-up internet provider in the region and carried out a variety of well-known internet projects such as Perm business portal Raid.ru. In July 2002, the company started providing IP-telephone service in Perm and left the main regional operator Opened JSC Uralsvyazinform behind.

In 2003, the company managed to start the construction of the Universal City Telecommunication Network (UCTN) for 200 000 flats in the first city of the project – Perm. The general principle applied to the construction was FTTH (Optics up to Home). Within two years, three cities took part in the project (Perm, Samara and Volgograd).

== Activity ==
In the cities of the project, ER-Telecom creates multiservice cable network of the same name as a platform for rendering all of the telecommunication services possible nowadays. ER-Telecom provides new possibilities for municipalities to realise social projects on the base of "Universal City Telecommunication Network" (UCTN) (connected with the safety, medicine services for the citizens, housing and communal services, penetration of info communications in different spheres of social life).

Nowadays the company develops telecommunication projects in 17 Russian cities: Saint-Petersburg, Perm, Chelyabinsk, Izhevsk, Kazan, Kirov, Naberezhnye Chelny, Nizhnekamsk, Nizhniy Novgorod, Novosibirsk, Omsk, Orenburg, Penza, Samara, Tyumen, Volgograd, Volzhsky and Yoshkar-Ola.

On the base of UCTN, ER-Telecom offers many different services including cable television (Dom.ru TV), high-speed broadband internet access, IP-telephony, DVB-C television (Dom.ru TV) as well as services for corporations (home office service, videoconference connection, telemetry collecting service and the like).

In January 2022 "M-Kom" Ltd, JV of ER-Telecom (75%) and Rostec (25%) founded in September 2021, bought 75% minus one share of "AKADO Holding". 25% is held by "AVK Investments", 51% and 49% of "AKADO Holding" respectively owned by "AVK Investments" and by Renova of Victor Vekselberg.

The Linx company with data centers and cloud services in Moscow and St. Petersburg is part of the ER-Telecom holding company.
