= World IPv6 Day and World IPv6 Launch Day =

Technology events in 2011 and 2012

World IPv6 Launch Day logo

World IPv6 Day was a technical testing and publicity event in 2011 sponsored and organized by the Internet Society and several large Internet content services to test and promote public IPv6 deployment. Following the success of the 2011 test day, the Internet Society carried out a World IPv6 Launch day on June 6, 2012 which, instead of just a test day, was planned to permanently enable IPv6 for the products and services of the participants.

== World IPv6 Day ==
World IPv6 Day was announced on January 12, 2011 with five anchoring companies: Facebook, Google, Yahoo, Akamai Technologies, and Limelight Networks. The event started at 00:00 UTC on June 8, 2011 and ended at 23:59 the same day. The main motivation for the event was to evaluate the real world effects of the IPv6 brokenness as seen by various synthetic tests. To this end, during World IPv6 Day major web companies and other industry players enabled IPv6 on their main websites for 24 hours. An additional goal was to motivate organizations across the industry – Internet service providers, hardware makers, operating system vendors and web companies – to prepare their services for IPv6, so as to ensure a successful transition from IPv4 as address space runs out.

The test primarily consisted of websites publishing AAAA records, which allow IPv6-capable hosts to connect using IPv6. Although Internet service providers (ISP) have been encouraged to participate, they were not expected to deploy anything active on that day, just increase their readiness to handle support issues. The concept was widely discussed at the 2010 Google IPv6 Conference.

Many companies and organizations participated in the experiment, including the largest search engines, social networking websites and Internet backbone & content distribution networks.

=== Participants ===
There were more than 400 participants in the original World IPv6 Day. including some of the most heavily accessed destinations on the Internet, content distribution networks, as well as various Internet service and infrastructure providers including: Comcast, Google, Yahoo, Facebook, Yandex YouTube, Akamai Technologies, Limelight Networks, Microsoft, Vonage, AOL, Mapquest, T-Online, Cisco, Juniper Networks, Huawei, the NTP pool, the US Department of Commerce, MasterCard, the BBC, and Telmex.

=== Results ===
Major carriers measured the percentage of IPv6 traffic of all Internet traffic as increasing from 0.024% to 0.041% with respect to native and tunneled stacks combined. Most IPv6 traffic in consumer access networks was to Google sites. Demonstrating the need for content sites to adopt IPv6 for success, the biggest increase was actually in 6to4 transitional technologies. Early results indicated that the day passed according to plan and without significant problems for the participants.

Cisco and Google reported no significant issues during the test. Facebook called the results encouraging, and decided to leave their developer site IPv6-enabled as a result. But the consensus was that more work needed to be done before IPv6 could consistently be applied.

The participants said they would continue to perform detailed analyses of the data. Many participants found it worthwhile to continue to maintain dual-stacks.

== World IPv6 Launch ==
Following the success of the original World IPv6 Day, the exercise was repeated on June 6, 2012 as the World IPv6 Launch, this time with the intention of leaving IPv6 permanently enabled on all participating sites. The event was billed as "this time, it's for real".

=== Participants ===
Participants in the World IPv6 Launch included those from the 2011 test day, and many more, including the Wikimedia Foundation, which permanently enabled IPv6 on its sites, including Wikipedia.

=== Results ===
According to Alain Fiocco of Cisco, content that currently receives roughly 30% of global World Wide Web IPv4 pageviews should now have become available via IPv6 after World IPv6 Launch Day. IPv6 traffic on AMS-IX rose by 50% on the launch Day, from 2 Gbit/s to 3 Gbit/s. IPv6 traffic on Amsterdam Internet Exchange was measured by ether type distribution as 0.4 percent, while IPv4 was measured as 99.6 percent on average in both daily and weekly graphs.

== See also ==
- IPv6 deployment
- IPv6 brokenness and DNS whitelisting
