= Infolink =

Bangladeshi Internet service provider

Coordinates: 23°48′25″N 90°25′08″E

InfoLink Limited
- Native name: ইনফোলিংক লিমিটেড
- Company type: Privately held company
- Industry: Internet, GPS Tracker, Telecommunication, Information technology, Internet service provider, ISP, IPTV
- Headquarters: 56 Reza Plaza, Pragati Sharani, Block J, Baridhara, Dhaka, Bangladesh
- Area served: Worldwide
- Key people: Mahi B. Chowdhury (Chairman); Sakif Ahmed (Director) & (CEO); Ashfah Huque (Managing Director)
- Services: Internet service, Vehicle Tracker, IPTV, Call Center, Networking, Software development, Website development
- Website: infolink.com.bd

InfoLink Limited is a nationwide Bangladeshi Internet service provider (ISP), tracking service provider, call center, IPTV service provider and IT company working in the field of broadband internet, connectivity, software development, data center service and networking. It was the first company in Bangladesh to commercially deploy Bangladeshi-assembled kiosks, and it was the first company in Bangladesh to commercially deploy IPv6. It also does many social activities.

on 24 May 2017 Infolink Limited Successfully started commercial IPv6 beta deployment to end-users for the first time in Bangladesh.

== Outline of services ==
The company provides the following services:

- Cable and wireless network internet services
- Vehicle Tracking Service
- IPTV Services
- Data connectivity services
- Establishment and installation of unified networks
- Manufacture and connection of visitor kiosks
- Internet and IT-related value-added services
- Maintenance and monitoring of high-volume network traffic and networking hardware.

The company was awarded a contract for Jamuna Future Park to connect all parts of the large shopping mall to ensure that the entire network can be controlled and maintained from a single location.

== Membership ==
- Bangladesh Computer Samity - BCS membership number 1087.
- Bangladesh Association of Software and Information Services - BASIS membership number G571.
- E-Commerce Association of Bangladesh - e-Cab membership number 485.
