= Goldstar TV =

- Country: Germany
- Broadcast area: Germany, Switzerland
- Headquarters: Ismaning, Germany

Programming
- Language(s): German
- Picture format: 576i (16:9 SDTV)

Ownership
- Owner: Mainstream Media AG
- Sister channels: Heimatkanal; Hit24; Romance TV

History
- Launched: 1 December 2000; 24 years ago

Links
- Website: www.goldstar-tv.de

Goldstar TV is a German-language television station produced by Mainstream Media AG based in Ismaning, Germany.

== History ==
The program was originally developed by GoldStar TV GmbH & Co. KG and is now being continued by Mainstream Media AG as part of a change of name to a stock corporation. The programme consists mainly of Volkstümliche Musik and schlager music. Designed as a 24-hour special-interest programme, it features music clips, moderated music programmes and recordings of hit events as well as live concerts. The channel received its broadcasting license from the Bayerische Landeszentrale für neue Medien in Munich and launched its program on March 1, 2000, where Goldstar TV was broadcast via satellite as well as cable networks as part of Premiere/Sky Deutschland's program bouquet in Germany and Austria until October 31, 2017. Since 1 November 2017, the station can be received only via the streaming media services of Amazon Video (Prime Video Channel), Waipu.tv, Zattoo, TV Spielfilm Live and Mobile2Morrow Television anymore.
