= NetCologne =

German telecommunications provider

- Company type: GmbH
- Founded: 1994
- Headquarters: Cologne, Germany
- Area served: Cologne region
- Products: Telecommunication
- Revenue: € 266 million
- Number of employees: 898
- Website: netcologne.de

NetCologne is a regional telecommunications, cable television and Internet service provider in the Cologne region of Germany. It operates its own copper, coaxial, FTTB and CDMA2000 networks. It serves 518.000 customers and is owned by the city of Cologne. The company has around 900 employees.
