= 6bone =

Former experimental network used to test IPv6

The 6bone was a testbed for Internet Protocol version 6; it was an outgrowth of the IETF IPng project that created the IPv6 protocols intended to eventually replace the current Internet network layer protocols known as IPv4. The 6bone was started outside the official IETF process at the March 1996 IETF meetings, and became a worldwide informal collaborative project, with eventual oversight from the "NGtrans" (IPv6 Transition) Working Group of the IETF.

The original mission of the 6bone was to establish a network to foster the development, testing, and deployment of IPv6 using a model to be based upon the experiences from the Mbone, hence the name "6bone".

The 6bone started as a virtual network (using IPv6 over IPv4 tunneling/encapsulation) operating over the IPv4-based Internet to support IPv6 transport, and slowly added native links specifically for IPv6 transport. Although the initial 6bone focus was on testing of standards and implementations, the eventual focus became more on testing of transition and operational procedures, as well as actual IPv6 network usage.

The 6bone operated under the IPv6 Testing Address Allocation (see RFC 2471), which specified the 3FFE::/16 IPv6 prefix for 6bone testing purposes.

At its peak in mid-2003, over 150 6bone top level 3FFE::/16 network prefixes were routed, interconnecting over 1000 sites in more than 50 countries. When it became obvious that the availability of IPv6 top level production prefixes was assured, and that commercial and private IPv6 networks were being operated outside the 6bone using these prefixes, a plan was developed to phase out the 6bone (see RFC 3701).

The phaseout plan called for a halt to new 6bone prefix allocations on 1 January 2004 and the complete cessation of 6bone operation and routing over the 6bone testing prefixes on 6 June 2006. Addresses within the 6bone testing prefix have now reverted to the IANA.

== Related RFCs ==
- RFC 2471 IPv6 Testing Address Allocation
- RFC 3701 6bone (IPv6 Testing Address Allocation) Phaseout
