= Internet Society =

Internet development organization

- Abbreviation: ISOC
- Formation: December 11, 1992; 33 years ago
- Founders: Vint Cerf; Bob Kahn
- Tax ID no.: 54-1650477
- Legal status: 501(c)(3) nonprofit organization
- Purpose: Internet development, infrastructure, accessibility and standards
- Headquarters: Reston, Virginia, U.S.
- Region served: Global
- President, Chief Executive Officer: Sally Wentworth
- Chair, Board of Trustees: Ted Hardie
- Subsidiaries: Public Interest Registry (501(c)(3)); Internet Society Asia Limited (Singapore); Internet Society Foundation
- Revenue: US$56,762,624 (2018)
- Expenses: US$45,104,865 (2018)
- Employees: 110 (2018)
- Volunteers: 4,099 (IETF, IESG, IAB, IRTF) (2018)
- Website: internetsociety.org

The Internet Society (ISOC) is an American non-profit advocacy organization whose purpose is to promote an open and safe internet. Founded in 1992, it has offices in Reston, Virginia, United States, and Geneva, Switzerland, with local chapters around the world.

== Organization ==
The Internet Society has regional bureaus worldwide, composed of chapters, organizational members, and, as of July 2020, more than 70,000 individual members. The Internet Society has a staff of more than 100 and is governed by a board of trustees, whose members are appointed or elected by the society's chapters, organization members, and the Internet Engineering Task Force (IETF). The IETF comprised the Internet Society's volunteer base. Its leadership includes chairman of the Board of Trustees, Ted Hardie; and President and CEO, Sally Wentworth.

The Internet Society created the Public Interest Registry (PIR), launched the Internet Hall of Fame, and served as the organizational home of the IETF. The Internet Society Foundation was created in 2017 as its independent philanthropic arm, which awarded grants to organizations.

== History ==
In 1991, the National Science Foundation (NSF) contract with the Corporation for National Research Initiatives (CNRI) to operate the Internet Engineering Task Force (IETF) expired. The need for an Internet Society was announced June 1991 at the ITC13 conference in Copenhagen, Denmark. The Internet Architecture Board (IAB), a committee of the IETF, actively encouraged the formation of a non-profit professional society. The intent was for the Internet Society to be designed primarily an international, grass-roots organization, as free as possible from domination by any single organization or subset of the Internet community.

In 1992 Vint Cerf, Bob Kahn, and Lyman Chapin announced the formation of the Internet Society as "a professional society to facilitate, support, and promote the evolution and growth of the Internet as a global research communications infrastructure", which would incorporate the IAB, the IETF, and the Internet Research Task Force (IRTF), plus the organization of the annual meetings. This arrangement was formalized in RFC1602 in 1993.

Anthony Rutkowski was appointed the first executive director of ISOC in 1994, after serving as vice-president and founding trustee for two years. The same year, ISOC founded its first Chapter in Japan and opened a permanent international headquarters in Reston, Virginia.

In 1995, Lawrence Landweber succeeded Vint Cerf as ISOC President, and Donald Heath became president and CEO of ISOC the following year.

In 1999, following the death of Jon Postel, ISOC established the Jonathan B. Postel Service Award. The award has been presented every year since 1999 by the Internet Society to "honor a person who has made outstanding contributions in service to the data communications community".

By mid-2000, the Internet Society's finances became precarious, and several individuals and organizations stepped forward to fill the gap. There were also trustees elected by individual members of the Internet Society, however those elections were "suspended" in 2001. This was ostensibly done due to the perception that the elections were too expensive for the financial state of the organization. In later bylaw revisions, the concept of individual member-selected trustees went from "suspended" to being deleted altogether.

In late 2001, leaders from Afilias (a domain name registry) approached then Internet Society CEO Lynn St. Amour to propose a novel partnership to jointly bid for the .org registry. In this model, the Internet Society would become the new home of .org, and all technical and service functions would be managed by Afilias. Afilias would pay for all bid expenses and would contribute towards the Internet Society payroll while the bid was under consideration by the Internet Corporation for Assigned Names and Numbers (ICANN). The Internet Society Board approved this proposal at its board meeting in 2001.

In 2002, ISOC's bid for the .org registry was successful and the group formed the Public Interest Registry (PIR) to manage and operate it.

In 2010, ISOC launched its first community network initiative to deploy five wireless mesh-based networks in rural locations across India.

In 2012, on ISOC's 20th anniversary, it established the Internet Hall of Fame, an award to "publicly recognize a distinguished and select group of visionaries, leaders, and luminaries who have made significant contributions to the development and advancement of the global Internet".

On June 8, 2011, ISOC mounted World IPv6 Day to test IPv6 deployment, and in 2012 launched Deploy360, a portal and training program to promote IPv6 and DNSSEC. On June 6, 2012, ISOC organized the World IPv6 Launch, this time with the intention of leaving IPv6 permanently enabled on all participating sites.

In 2016, Deploy 360 extended its campaigns to include Mutually Agreed Norms for Routing Security (MANRS) and DNS-based Authentication of Named Entities (DANE).

In September 2016, the Internet Society indicated that it would not seek to obtain a license from the Office of Foreign Assets Control (OFAC) of the US Department of the Treasury, which would have allowed it to fund the activities of Iranian nationals. This caused considerable distress to ISOC members in Iran, who were thus unable to launch an Internet Society chapter in Iran, and saw a fellowship revoked that the Internet Society had awarded to fund the travel of Iranian students to visit the Internet Governance Forum in Mexico.

In 2017 ISOC's North America Region launched an annual Indigenous Connectivity Summit with an event in Santa Fe, New Mexico. In subsequent years the event has been held in Inuvik, NWT, and Hilo, Hawaii.

In December 2017 ISOC absorbed the standards body Online Trust Alliance (OTA) which produces an annual Online Trust Audit, a Cyber Incident Response Guide, and an Internet of Things (IoT) Trust Framework.

In August 2018 the Internet Society organized the IETF more formally as the IETF Administration LLC (IETF LLC) underneath ISOC. The IETF LLC continues to be closely associated with ISOC and is significantly funded by ISOC.

In 2019, the Internet Society agreed to the sale of the Public Interest Registry (PIR) to Ethos Capital for $1.135 billion, a transaction initially expected to be completed in early 2020. The Internet Society said it planned to use the proceeds to fund an endowment. The Public Interest Registry is a non-profit subsidiary of the Internet Society which operates three top-level domain names (.ORG, .NGO, and .ONG), all of which have traditionally focused on serving the non-profit and non-governmental organization communities.

The sale was met with significant opposition due to involving the transfer of what is viewed as a public asset to a private equity investment firm. In late January 2020, the ICANN halted its final approval of the sale after the Attorney General of California requested detailed documentation from all parties, citing concerns that both ICANN and the Internet Society had potentially violated their public interest missions as registered charities subject to the laws of California. In February, the Internet Society's Chapter Advisory Council (which represents its membership) began the process to adopt a motion rejecting the sale if certain conditions were not complied with. On April 30, 2020, ICANN rejected the proposal to sell the PIR to Ethos Capital.

== Support of United Nations Internet Governance Initiative ==
The ubiquity of the Internet in modern-day society has prompted António Guterres, the United Nations Secretary-General to convene a panel of professional experts to discuss the future of the Internet and the role of the Internet in globalized digital cooperation. Three models were proposed after several rounds of discussion, i.e., a Digital Commons Architecture (DCA), a Distributed Co-Governance Architecture (CoGov), and a reformed Internet Governance Forum (IGF+). As of October 2020, the ISOC is leading and facilitating multi-round meetings for Stakeholders' Dialogue to collect, compile, and submit the inputs of worldwide professionals and experts for future governance of the Internet.

== Activities ==
In the late 1990s, the Internet Society established the Jonathan B. Postel Service Award. It was presented every year to honor a person who has made outstanding contributions in service to the data communications community.

The Internet Society's activities included MANRS (Mutually Agreed Norms for Routing Security) – which was launched in 2014 to provide crucial fixes to reduce the most common threats to the Internet's routing infrastructure.

The Internet Society hosts the annual Network and Distributed System Security (NDSS) Symposium.

The society organized the Africa Peering and Interconnection Forum (AfPIF) to help grow the Internet infrastructure in Africa and hosts Internet development conferences in developing markets.

The society offered Deploy360, an information hub, portal and training program to promote IPv6 and DNSSEC.

In 2017, it launched an annual Indigenous Connectivity Summit to connect tribal communities, starting with an event in Santa Fe, New Mexico. In subsequent years the event was held in Inuvik, NWT, and Hilo, Hawaii.

The society also publishes reports on global Internet issues, and has created tools, surveys, codes, and policy recommendations to improve Internet use. The society supports projects to build community networks and infrastructure, secure routing protocols, and advocate for end-to-end encryption.

ISOC LIVE livestreams and archives video via Vimeo Livestream, YouTube, archive.org, Twitch, Twitter, Facebook, Mastodon, and Discord, notably archiving the State of the Net Conference by the Internet Education Foundation, Hackers on Planet Earth and Internet Society events.

== See also ==
- Timeline of the history of the Internet
