= Tele Columbus =

German telecommunications company

Coordinates: 52°31′33″N 13°19′17″E

Tele Columbus AG
- Company type: Public
- ISIN: DE000TCAG172
- Industry: Telecommunications
- Founded: 1985
- Headquarters: Berlin, Germany
- Area served: Germany
- Key people: Markus Oswald (Chair); Jochen Busch (Board member); Christian Biechteler (Board member); Nicolai Oswald
- Products: Cable-TV, Internet and Telephone Services via broadband
- Brands: PŸUR
- Operating income: 426.258 million Euro (2024)
- Number of employees: 1,393 (2024)
- Website: www.telecolumbus.com

Tele Columbus is a large internet service provider in Germany with 3.6 million connected households via its Tier 3 network. Tele Columbus' services have been offered under the newly created umbrella brand PŸUR since September 2017.

== History ==
The company was formed in November 2006 following the merger of Tele Columbus GmbH and ewt multimedia GmbH.

In 2015, Tele Columbus acquired Primacom and Pepcom. In addition to analogue television, their range of products includes digital television, internet, and telephone via broadband. Besides its headquarter in Berlin the company has locations in Hamburg, Leipzig, Ratingen, and Unterföhring (Munich).

Tele Columbus AG has been traded on the regulated market (Prime Standard) of the Frankfurt Stock Exchange since January 2015 and has been listed on the SDAX from June 2015 to December 2020.
