= Primacom =

German cable television network operator

Primacom is a private cable television network operator in Germany, with around 1 million connected households and approximately 800 thousand customers. Primacom claims to be number 5 in Germany and a market leader in its core business in central Germany. Its corporate headquarters are in Leipzig. Primacom primarily provides services to clients in Eastern Germany (Berlin, Brandenburg, Mecklenburg-Western Pomerania, Saxony, Saxony-Anhalt, Thuringia) and in the states of Baden-Wuerttemberg, Hesse, Lower Saxony, North Rhine-Westphalia, Rhineland-Palatinate and Saarland. The company sells communications products such as TV (analog, digital, IP), Internet, and phones, as well as applications for elderly care at home and smart metering/telemetry.

== History ==
=== Company History ===
Primacom was formed in 1998 from the merger of Kabelmedia and Süweda. After the merger, the Group was publicly listed on the New Market and the NASDAQ on 22 February 1999. Since 5 June, 2003, the stock of PrimaCom AG is listed in the Prime Standard of Frankfurt Stock Exchange.

In August 2000, Primacom acquired the Multikabel company in the Netherlands, which was sold to UPC five years later. In September 2007, Orion Cable GmbH acquired nearly 91% of the shares of primacom group, with the aim to integrate the company with Tele Columbus Group, a company Orion Cable had already acquired. Orion Cable's attempts to integrate were stopped by Primacom in 2009, due to low success estimations. The halt of the integration led to uncertainty at the banks of primacom, and in December 2009 refinancing negotiations begun.

As part of the refinancing negotiations, the operational business of the Primacom Group was acquired by Medfort SARL in July 2010. Consequently, the company's operational business and the former holding company, PrimaCom AG, were separated. In January 2011, Primacom successfully completed the refinancing and is now focused on the development of its operating business.

The existing cable network is the main driver of the core business of the company. However, there were some changes over the years. While the core areas of the company were initially divided into two areas - Hessen / Rhineland-Palatinate, Baden-Württemberg on one side and areas in the east of Germany on the other, the existing networks in the western areas of Germany were sold to competitors during the following years. In 2008, the cable networks in Aachen and Wiebaden were sold to Unity Media. In 2010, the city networks in Mainz and Osnabrück were sold to Kabel Deutschland. Primacom began to relocate its headquarters to the eastern part of Germany, following the trend of cable network development. According to information provided by the company, this process will be completed by 2011.

== Organisation ==
The Luxembourg company Medfort SARL is holding 100 per cent of shares of the Primacom group. In turn, Perseus to SA is holding 100 per cent of Medfort SARL shares .

The operational business of the Group is led by the holding PrimaCom Management GmbH. Within the holding company, the operational assets as well as rights and licenses and also staff are performed in different operating units.

Two Managing Directors are appointed for all operational companies. These are: • Michael Dorn, Chief Executive Officer (CEO, COO), • Dipl.-Ing. Wolf Waschkuhn (CRO)

== Key Data ==
Primacom has about one million connected households, most of them being upgraded to the highest standard of technology according to company information. The core of the network is the backbone network installed by Primacom, a redundant and automatically controlled network controlled centrally from Leipzig. According to its own data, the turnover of the company is currently at about EUR 100 million with earnings before taxes, interest, depreciation and amortization of more than EUR 40 million.
