= Internet multistakeholder governance =

Internet governance

Multistakeholder participation is a specific governance approach whereby multiple relevant stakeholders participate in the collective shaping of evolutions and uses of the Internet.

In 2005, the Working Group in Internet Governance (WGIG), set up by the World Summit on the Information Society (WSIS), defined Internet governance as: 'development and application by governments, the private sector and civil society, in their respective roles, of shared principles, social norms, rules, decision-making procedures, and programs that shape the evolution and use of the Internet'. This is not identical to undifferentiated public participation in Internet issues. Instead, the concept of 'multistakeholder' signals specifically the distinct clusters of interests involved in any given digital issue and how these interests can be aggregated into decisions towards an Internet for the common good, rather than being captured by a single power center.

The general principle of participation in decision-making that impacts on the lives of individuals has been part of the Internet from its outset, accounting for much of its success. It recognizes the value of multistakeholder participation, incorporating users and a user-centric perspective as well as all other actors critical to developing, using and governing the Internet across a range of levels. The other principles are enriched by the multistakeholder participation principle, because it states that everyone should have a stake in the future of the Internet.

It is possible to define a number of broad categories of stakeholders in the Internet, with subgroups as well: states, businesses and industries, NGOs, civil society, international governmental organization, research actors, individuals, and others. Each of these categories has more or less unique stakes in the future of the Internet, but there are also areas of great overlap and interdependence. For instance, some NGOs, are likely to prioritize the promotion of human rights; meanwhile parliaments are primary actors in defining laws to protect these rights. Still other stakeholders are key to shaping rights online, such as search engine providers, and Internet service providers (ISPs). Individuals also have particular roles to play in respecting, promoting and protecting rights.

== Internet governance ==
=== Internet governance ===
Internet governance is the development and application of shared principles, norms, rules, decision-making procedures and programs that shape the evolution and use of the Internet. Internet governance should not be confused with e-governance, which refers to governments' use of technology to carry out their governing duties. Although, the argument can be made that Internet governance 'as a unitary regime may in fact be an impossibility', a broader conceptualization of governance recognizes both the entirety and the diversity of governance activities that steer the "ship".

The Tunis Agenda for the Information Society, defines Internet governance as: "the development and application by governments, the private sector and civil society, in their respective roles, of shared principles, norms, rules, decision-making procedures, and programmes that shape the evolution and use of the Internet."

=== Specificity ===
It is often argued that multi-stakeholder participation is better, at least in principle, 'than governance by governments alone', as it can uphold the interests of non-elected actors in relation to governments (most of which are elected, although others not). In addition, governments may lack the necessary competence and/or adequate political will in relation to expert and benign Internet governance. Multi-stakeholder participation more broadly can be posited as a way to prevent capture of the Internet by one constituency to the expense of another – whether this is capture by various state actors and their interstate organizations, or by private sector interests nationally or internationally. In other words, governments themselves have an interest in multi-stakeholder modalities as a way to prevent Internet capture by other power centers. The participation of more stakeholders can inject expertise and reflect a diversity of needs. The legitimacy thus ascribed to multi-stakeholder decision-making is closely tied to 'the expectation of a higher quality of policy outcomes', or simply 'better governance'.

The reality of multi-stakeholder participation is sometimes challenged by issues that relate both to the nature of the Internet itself – including jurisdiction and enforcement, scale, and the pace at which it changes and grows – as well as challenges pertaining to its governance.

=== Stakeholders ===
Broadly taken, the notion of stakeholders considers anyone or any entity with a legitimate interest in a particular Internet governance issue as a 'stakeholder'. It recognizes that not all stakeholders automatically self-realize or self-identify as stakeholders, and not all multi-stakeholder processes include all stakeholders. It further recognizes that multi-stakeholder-based participation represents interests-based participation, rather than undifferentiated, individual or idiosyncratic involvement by members of the public. multi-stakeholder approaches should welcome and not exclude disagreement and minority or less-popular viewpoints, but may justifiably exclude disruptive actors who deploy disagreement to unreasonably disrupt the process or to damage trust.

Gender divides are a significant and pressing challenge facing the Universality of the Internet ecosystem – ranging from women's ability to access and benefit the Internet to their ability to participate meaningfully in multi-stakeholder processes.

There is continued disagreement about what the definition of multi-stakeholder participation in governance actually is or should be, issues of due recognition, the scope of participation and unequal nature of representation – particularly from developing countries and civil society participants, the (in)ability to reach consensus, the exclusivity of some ostensibly inclusive processes and the unwillingness to listen to different views, attempts to establish legitimacy, the sometimes slow pace of multi-stakeholder mechanisms, as well as the increasing number of stakeholders and complexity of challenges involved as the importance of the Internet to everyday life and economies becomes increasingly clear. All these challenges are significant and sometimes they differ depending on the context and issue or topic at hand. However, three general concerns that are frequently mentioned in the literature, relate to the conspicuous dominance or absence of certain participants, especially the private sector; how multi-stakeholder mechanisms should be balanced with multilateral arrangements; and what the relationship between Internet governance at national and international levels is or should be.

=== The evolution of multi-stakeholder participation ===
multi-stakeholder participation and governance mechanisms may be a 'rather recent invention', but they have a longer tradition as an 'organizing principle and political practice'. Such approaches are far from unique to Internet governance; with claims of their application and use especially prevalent in topics with cross-border or international relevance. Examples include labor relations, environmental protection, finance, human rights, and sustainable development. Where the Internet is concerned, multi-stakeholder participation in its governance seems to possibly be both intrinsic – and more complicated – than in many other instances of multi-stakeholder participation. The ways in which the Internet was designed has both allowed and disallowed specific types of behavior online; meaning that the actions that led to the creation of the Internet were already acts of governance (albeit most likely unintended).

Although some have argued that the Internet is free from any regulatory oversight or jurisdictional restraints and should remain so, the Internet internally was never entirely a rule-free nor a 'law-free zone', nor was it a different universe to external legal constraints. Due to its unique design and composition, many have argued that the Internet requires non-traditional forms of governance – and particularly governance forms encouraging the participation of more stakeholders in addition to governments (democratic or otherwise), which have been the key agent of governance in the Westphalian system of national states.

The Internet is often cited as not only one of the prime examples of multi-stakeholder participation in governance, but sometimes described as inherently 'multi-stakeholder'. The Internet is defined by open, distributed, interconnected, participatory, and bottom-up processes – features that match multi-stakeholder participation in specific regard to its governance. Vint Cerf, one of the authors of the Internet Protocol (IP), has similarly noted that: "There is no question in my mind that the diversity of players in the Internet universe demands a multi-stakeholder approach to governance in the most general sense of the word. The debate around how the Internet is or should be governed has in some ways evolved from a discussion of how/whether the Internet can be governed to one concerning 'whether there is (or should be) something new and different about the way we do so". Cerf's words 'in the most general sense of the word' are important, as they also underpin the view that an understanding of multi-stakeholder approaches should not be approached in a dogmatic manner. The demand for and value of multi-stakeholder participation in Internet governance was first explicitly expressed at the WSIS, which took place in two phases between 2003 (in Geneva, Switzerland, with a focus on principles) and 2005 (in Tunis, Tunisia, with a focus on implementation).

== Multi-stakeholder governance in practice ==
=== KICTANet ===
Kenya is widely regarded as a leading developing country participant in the global Internet governance field and has one of the most vibrant Internet governance communities in Africa. Kenya's information and communications technology (ICT) evolution, explains Professor Bitange Ndemo, who previously served as Kenya's Permanent Secretary for ICT, was catalysed during President Mwai Kibai's administration (2003–2013). This 'golden decade' for ICT innovation spurred numerous policy developments in the country's ICT sector, along with corresponding success stories like the innovative mobile financial service M-Pesa. It saw the creation of not only the world's first national and regional IGF initiatives, but also an oft-lauded multi-stakeholder platform for deliberation on policy and other developments pertaining to the ICT sector in October 2004, the Kenya ICT Action Network (KICTANet).

Alice Munyua, who was part of Kenya's civil society delegation to WSIS, explains that shortly after WSIS she was commissioned to support the development of Kenya's ICT sector as a part of Catalysing Access to ICT in Africa (CATIA), a development programme which was supported by the UK Department for International Development (DFID). Recognizing the ICT policy gap in Kenya, Munyua commissioned research to determine which stakeholders would need to be consulted or engaged in developing a new ICT policy for the country. As she later advised in a co-written volume: It is useful to carry out a stakeholder analysis at the beginning of a multi-stakeholder process to ensure that there is a clear understanding of who should be involved in the process, to what extent, and at what time during the process. Using the results of the Kenya stakeholder analysis, participants from the media, business, civil society, academic, and development sectors were invited to an initial meeting in October 2004.

KICTANet was created as a loose alliance at this meeting with the specific aim of developing an ICT policy framework for the country. It was specifically designed to welcome multi-stakeholder participation due to the 'perceived strength and effectiveness in joint collaborative policy advocacy activities, which would be based on pooling skills and resources,' as opposed to wasting resources in 'competing, overlapping advocacy'. Its operating slogan was, 'let's talk though we may not agree'. Tina James, who worked with CATIA when it supported the creation of KICTANet, points out: 'the creation of KICTANet was just the right process at the right time.'

With government and other stakeholders apparently relying on it, KICTANet therefore continued after the ICT policy was adopted, leading to 'quite a lot of successes' like the 2010 Kenya ICT Master Plan, as well as the regulatory approval of M-Pesa and Voice over Internet Protocol (VOIP) services in the country. It also, for instance, participated in discussions that led to the drafting and passing of the National Cybersecurity Strategy (2014) and coordinated public participation in consultations like the 2014 African Union Convention on Cybersecurity. By managing a website and mailing list with almost 800 participants from diverse stakeholder groups, it has been described as 'perhaps the biggest virtual convener of ICT stakeholders in Kenya'.

Grace Mutung'u, a KICTANet associate responsible for policy and regulatory analysis, worries that Kenya's Internet governance capacity is still limited to a 'small bubble'; leading to doubts about what the network's actual capacity and influence is in the country.

=== The Marco Civil ===
The Marco Civil da Internet, otherwise known as the Brazilian Internet Bill of Rights or the Brazilian Civil Rights Framework for the Internet, was sanctioned by then president Dilma Rousseff at the time of the NETMundial meeting in 2014.

This case is viewed as one of the first attempts for initiatives to become more concrete, formal, accountable, and tangible, rather than merely aspirational, and identifiable therefore as being covered by what has come to be known as the 'digital constitutionalism umbrella'. The Marco Civil process also shows that multi-stakeholder processes are 'a compelling hallmark of digital constitutionalism'.

The Marco Civil therefore emerged as a rights-based response to the 'Azeredo' Bill. The process began in 2009 when the Ministry of Justice's Office of Legislative Affairs (SAL/MJ) requested the Centre for Technology and Society at Getulio Vargas Foundation (CTS-FGV) to help coordinate a process of public consultations engaging all stakeholders, including those who had been vocal in opposing the Azeredo Bill. SAL/MJ enabled public consultations using a portal administered by the Ministry of Culture. SAL's principal reason for using this platform was that the participatory process enabled by the online platform would serve as a complementary branch to the traditional legislative process.

As some analysts point out: "Once it became clear that Brazil needed a bill of rights for the Internet, it also became clear that the Internet itself could and should be used as a tool for drafting the legislation". The period of public comments was divided into two phases. The first phase involved consulting with the general public regarding certain principles proposed for debate, while the second phase involved examining each article and paragraph of the proposed draft bill. A focus group participant pointed out that dividing the process into these two phases allowed stakeholders sufficient time to develop positions on key aspects of the Bill.

After the process of public consultations, the Marco Civil was introduced in the National Congress on 24 August 2011. The bill was submitted to the House of Representatives on several occasions but was unable to make further progress in parliament. Carlos Affonso Souza, director of the Institute for Technology and Society of Rio de Janeiro (ITS Rio), remembers that this moment in the bill's development coincided with a change of administration and became a 'crucial moment' with concerns as to whether the Bill would withstand political constraints and change: People began to wonder if the multi-stakeholder effort that took us so long to achieve was being put in peril because of this change of administration. The Marco Civil only resurfaced on the national legislative agenda in 2013 when Edward Snowden, an ex-National Security Agency (NSA) contractor, made revelations regarding pervasive surveillance practices by certain intelligence agencies.

In September 2013 Rousseff decided that the bill should be tabled in the House of Representatives and the Senate with constitutional urgency. The final version explicitly notes that to aid the development of the Internet in Brazil, mechanisms must be established to enhance and guarantee multi-stakeholder, transparent, collaborative, and democratic participation between private actors, civil society, and academia (Art. 24). While the WSIS process outcomes and CGI.br Principles also provide important reference points for Brazil's adoption of multi-stakeholder approaches in international fora where Internet governance is concerned.

=== South Korea's case ===
The Constitutional challenge in the Republic of South Korea illustrates not only a multi-stakeholder model but also the importance of having strong institutions like an independent judiciary to protect human rights online. On 24 August 2012, the South Korean Constitutional Court unanimously ruled that certain user identity verification provisions in the country were unconstitutional. For five years, the provisions had required all major website operators in the Republic of South Korea to obtain, verify, and store personal identification details from any user wanting to post anything on their platforms. This constitutional challenge shows how the stakeholders collaborated to bring this challenge before the Constitutional Court of South Korea.

The consequences of the provisions were widespread and attracted both local and global criticism. For instance, Frank La Rue, then the United Nations (UN) Special Rapporteur on the Promotion and Protection of Freedom of Expression, undertook a mission to South Korea in May 2010 and expressed concerns about the condition of freedom of expression in the country. While he acknowledged the need to protect citizens from 'legitimate concerns regarding crimes perpetrated via the Internet and the responsibility of the Government to identify such persons', he also warned about potential chilling effects and the 'impact of such identification systems to the right to freedom of expression, which is rooted in anonymity'.

Around 2008, certain South Korean Internet stakeholders – including academics, the business community, technical community, civil society, and participants from the legal community – started having frequent, informal meetings to discuss Internet policies and related issues. These discussions became more vibrant after YouTube disabled its Korean page and published a blog post explaining and defending its global stance on freedom of expression.

The technical community provided information about how futile it was to try to identify users accurately or to measure the number of unique visitors to a page; while the business community provided data on the costs of establishing, storing, and managing such a system safely. Civil society organizations presented concerns to the Court about the effects the provisions were having on fundamental rights and the value of online anonymity. The Constitutional Court issued a unanimous ruling on 24 August 2012 that the provisions were unconstitutional for reasons ranging from the effect of the provisions on freedom of expression, freedom of the media, the right to privacy, and the unfair costs incurred by website operators. Professor Keechang Kim considers that: "What happened in South Korea really shows some of the very serious shortcomings or negative consequences if Internet-related policies are taken in a very one-sided, top-down manner."

This case shows that reactive multistakeholder collaboration can be useful in addressing challenges, like restrictive legislation, that infringe upon Internet Universality (in this case freedom of expression and privacy rights) in one way or another.

=== The Internet Governance Forum ===
The Internet Governance Forum (IGF) is created by the WSIS and, more specifically, the Tunis Agenda. Despite scepticism and criticism relating to, among other things, the IGF's ability to influence policy and/or to act as an Internet governance body, it has been described as integrally 'part of the fabric of internet governance and as 'a type of new laboratory' in which to 'promote multi-stakeholderism through multi-stakeholderism'. One writer, for instance, points out that: "The IGF is the first organisation in Internet governance whose founding was explicitly based on the multi-stakeholder principle." The IGF's Best Practice Forum (BPF) on Gender, more specifically, global focused, gender dimensioned, broader public policy emphasised. Also, the case introduces interesting questions pertaining to how multistakeholder participation is affected when disruptive actors participate in a process or activity.

The IGF's mandate is tasked with, among other things, discussing public policy issues related to key elements of Internet governance by facilitating the exchange of information and best practices and by making 'full use of the expertise of the academic, scientific and technical communities'. It is, at least in theory, multi-stakeholder in composition, and should furthermore strengthen and enhance 'the engagement of stakeholders in existing and/or future Internet governance mechanisms, particularly those from developing countries'.

To enrich the potential for more tangible outputs, the IGF's Multi-stakeholder Advisory Group (MAG) and Secretariat developed an intersessional programme intended to complement other IGF activities, such as regional and national IGF initiatives (NRIs), dynamic coalitions (DCs) and so-called best practice forums (BPFs). The outputs from this programme were designed to 'become robust resources, to serve as inputs into other pertinent forums, and to evolve and grow over time'.

In 2015, the MAG decided to devote one of six BPFs to a gender-related challenge facing the Internet. Jac sm Kee of the global civil society organization Association for Progressive Communications (APC), who was one of the lead coordinators of the BPF Gender in 2015 and 2016, says that gender was increasingly becoming a pressing issue in Internet governance discussions at the time, which was why she originally proposed it to the MAG. While there was debate within the MAG as to what such a BPF should be focusing on, Kee takes the view that 'because of the multistakeholder nature' of MAG meetings and programme development procedures, whatever is proposed tends to be 'taken on'. In 2015, the BPF Gender focused more specifically on online abuse and gender-based violence as 'an increasingly important and focused area' in the field of gender and Internet governance.

Each year the BPF coordinators and rapporteur adopted a semi-structured methodology by organizing fortnightly virtual calls to introduce the topic to stakeholders, to welcome broader participation, to define the scope of the BPF's priorities, and to investigate proposed methodologies that could encourage multi-stakeholder participation. In 2016, the BPF also tried to involve more stakeholders from other regions by arranging onsite meetings at certain NRIs, including Brazil IGF, Asia-Pacific Regional IGF (APrIGF), the IGF of Latin America, and the Caribbean (LACIGF). These sessions were used to gather local best practices and to raise awareness of the BPF's work. Where possible, lessons and stories gathered from these events were integrated into the BPF's outcome report in 2016.

The case of the IGF's BPF Gender illustrates the difficulties of promoting multi-stakeholder participation in Internet governance when certain, especially potentially contentious, topics are involved. It similarly shows the potential chilling effects that the participation of disruptive actors might have on a volunteer-driven, multi-stakeholder process. In that sense, it demonstrates the need to sometimes balance the values of openness and transparency often cherished in multi-stakeholder processes at the IGF with the need to also protect the safety and privacy of participants.

== Internet universality ==
=== Concept ===
Internet Universality is the concept that "the Internet is much more than infrastructure and applications, it is a network of economic and social interactions and relationships, which has the potential to enable Human rights, empower individuals and communities, and facilitate sustainable development. The concept is based on four principles stressing the Internet should be Human rights-based, Open, Accessible, and based on Multistakeholder participation. These have been abbreviated as the R-O-A-M principles. Understanding the Internet in this way helps to draw together different facets of Internet development, concerned with technology and public policy, rights and development."

=== Indicators ===
UNESCO is now developing Internet Universality indicators – based on the ROAM principles – to help governments and other stakeholders to assess their own national Internet environments and to promote the values associated with Internet Universality. The research process was envisioned to include consultations at a range of global forums and a written questionnaire sent to key actors, but also a series of publications on important Internet Freedom related issues as encryption, hate speech online, privacy, digital safety and journalism sources. The outcome of this multidimensional research will be publicized in June 2018. The final indicators will be submitted to the UNESCO Member States in the International Program for Development of Communication (IPDC) for endorsement.

== Values for effective multistakeholder practices ==
Inclusiveness
Inclusiveness as a value signifies that participants in a multistakeholder process collaborate, while retaining different roles and responsibilities. Closely related to R.O.A.M. values of accessibility and openness, inclusivity encapsulates the needs to overcome barriers to accessible participation and to dedicate sufficient funding and capacity-building efforts to promote the participation of a rich diversity of stakeholders.
Diversity
Aims to ensure that an Internet governance process can benefit from different viewpoints in addressing the complex and diverse stakeholder concerns inherent to an Internet governance challenge.
Collaboration
The challenge or concern which needs to be addressed should be defined clearly from the outset, and stakeholders should agree on common norms to guide working methods, including the extent of transparency, flexibility required, ways of making decisions, and means to promote and protect participants' safety and rights when participating in a multistakeholder process.
Equality
Not only do multistakeholder processes and working methods need to be open and transparent to ensure that any stakeholder can participate at any stage of a multistakeholder process, but the stakeholders that do participate need to be clear about their interests and affiliations.
Flexibility and relevance
Due to the pace of technological change, multistakeholder participation needs to be flexible enough to ensure that a process or activity can adapt to the changing needs of an Internet governance challenge or concern. Multistakeholder participation should be customised to be relevant to local, regional, national and global instances of multistakeholder collaboration.
Privacy and safety
It is important that adequate steps are taken to ensure that participants' safety and privacy needs are met as far as is reasonably possible, especially where potentially contentious topics related to the future and evolution of the Internet are concerned.
Accountability and legitimacy
Multistakeholder mechanisms should regularly evaluate processes, outcomes and goals to ensure that they remain legitimate, relevant, and transparently on track.
Responsiveness
The frame of 'digital constitutionalism' entails a notion of institutionalised processes with foundational and possibly legal character, which gives rise – in such iterations of multistakeholder practice – to the further notion of rights and duties concerning involvement, and thence that involved parties are entitled to a feedback loop about their participation.

== See also ==
- Multistakeholder governance

== Sources ==
This article incorporates text from a free content work. Licensed under CC BY SA 3.0 IGO (license statement/permission). Text taken from What if we all governed the Internet? Advancing multistakeholder participation in Internet governance, 107, Anri van der Spuy, UNESCO.
