= Working Group on Internet Governance =

United Nations working group

The Working Group on Internet Governance (WGIG) was a United Nations multistakeholder working group initiated after the 2003 World Summit on the Information Society (WSIS) first phase Summit in Geneva failed to agree on the future of Internet governance. The first phase of World Summit on the Information Society (WSIS) agreed to continue the dialogue on Internet Governance in the Declaration of Principles and Action Plan adopted on 12 December 2003, to prepare for a decision at the second phase of the WSIS in Tunis during November 2005. In this regard, the first phase of the Summit requested the United Nations Secretary-General to establish a Working Group on Internet Governance (WGIG).

The main activity of the WGIG was "to investigate and make proposals for action, as appropriate, on the governance of Internet by 2005". The WGIG was asked to present the result of its work in a report "for consideration and appropriate action for the second phase of the WSIS in Tunis 2005".

It was asked, inter alia, to deal with the following issues:

- Develop a working definition of Internet Governance;
- Identify the public policy issues that are relevant to Internet Governance;
- Develop a common understanding of the respective roles and responsibilities of governments, existing international organizations and other forums as well as the private sector and civil society from both developing and developed countries.

A few weeks before the release of the WGIG Report the U.S. reiterated its claim of ICANN and stated that it wished to "maintain its historic role in authorizing changes or modifications to the authoritative root zone file".

== Membership ==
The chair of WGIG was Nitin Desai, and the executive coordinator was Markus Kummer.

The 40 official members are listed in the final report; in addition, there were many people attending informally to contribute their views.

== View of Internet governance ==
The report of the WGIG divided Internet Governance into four sections:

- Infrastructure (mainly the Domain Name System and IP addresses)
- Internet issues such as security, safety and privacy (including spam and cybercrime)
- Intellectual property and international trade (including copyrights)
- Development issues (particularly developing countries)

== Proposals ==
Four options for the management of Internet-related public policy issues were proposed in the Report of the WGIG, finalised during their fourth meeting, and presented to stakeholders on 18 July 2005 in preparation for the November 2005 meeting in Tunis, Tunisia. These proposals all include the introduction of an open multi-stakeholder based Internet governance forum to give greater influence to stakeholders around the world, including civil society, the private sector, and governments. Each model included different strategies for the oversight role, currently held by the United States Department of Commerce.

The proposed models were:

1. Create the Global Internet Council (GIC) consisting of governments and involved stakeholders to assume the U.S. oversight role of ICANN.
2. Ensure that ICANNs Governmental Advisory Committee is an official forum for debate, strengthening its position by allowing for the support of various governments.
3. Remove the U.S. oversight of ICANN and restrict it to the narrow technical role, forming the International Internet Council (IIC) to manage most aspects of the Internet administration.
4. Create three new bodies:
  - The Global Internet Policy Council (GIPC) to manage "internet-related public policy issues"
  - The World Internet Corporation for Assigned Names and Numbers (WICANN) to take over from ICANN
  - The Global Internet Governance Forum (GIGF), a central debating forum for governments.

== Timeline ==
Date	Event
December 2003	WSIS meeting in Geneva
21 September 2004	WGIG formed
23 November 2004 – 25 November 2004	First meeting
14 February 2005 – 18 February 2005	Second meeting
18 April 2005 – 20 April 2005	Third meeting
14 June 2005 – 17 June 2005	Fourth meeting – finalisation of the WGIG Report
September 2005	Prepcom3 - Negotiation on Internet Governance
November 2005	WSIS Phase II Summit meeting in Tunis – Agreement signed to create the Internet Governance Forum

== Analysis ==
Some critics have hinted that the idea that the world's countries require a more "equal" say in Internet governance, masks the desire by some governments to conduct censorship or monitor their citizens more effectively.

Fears that increased "governance" will bring with it more regulation and fees have been expressed. IT experts have expressed doubts that a U.N. body that does not necessarily know enough about the Internet will effectively coordinate the Internet technologically. The director of ICANN has expressed concerns that some of the changes proposed represent a government-focused "top-down" philosophy, and that this is incompatible with the current "bottom-up" structure of the Internet mandated by US policy. The U.S Government's negotiating position in Tunis Prepcom 3 was flexible on the principle of global involvement, very strong on the principle of multistakeholder participation, but inflexible on the need for US control to remain for the foreseeable future in order to ensure the "security and stability of the Internet". This generally showed itself in U.S. support for proposals allowing other governments to have a larger role in the management of their ccTLDs, but no change to the management or control of the root zone file.

The majority of stakeholders want to avoid a politicisation of the Internet, and some consider the effort of the WGIG as launching a set of alien and dangerous terms and ideas. Others believe that it has been an important forum for discussion of the often contentious issue of Internet governance, as well as a model for multi-stakeholder cooperation.

Some feel that either of the alternatives is better: a division of the Internet or a defense of the status quo. The United States has traditionally considered its function as a defender of citizens' rights worldwide, which is one reason it wants to keep the Internet free for private individuals rather than overly regulated by governments or international organisations. Some of the options presented in the WGIG Report may be seen by some as too government-oriented, while one option reflects the status quo, and may be seen as being too US-centric.

The final agreements reached in Tunis, the Tunis Agenda and the Tunis Commitment, include the formation of the Internet Governance Forum. No agreement was reached on the oversight function.

== See also ==
- ICANN (Internet Corporation for Assigned Names and Numbers)
- International Telecommunication Union (ITU)
- Internet Society (ISOC)
- Internet Governance Forum (IGF)
- Multistakeholder Model
