= Internet governance =

System of laws, policies and practices

Internet governance is the effort by governments, the private sector, civil society, and technical actors to develop and apply shared principles, norms, rules, and decision-making procedures that shape the evolution and use of the Internet. This article describes how the Internet was and is currently governed, some inherent controversies, and ongoing debates regarding how and why the Internet should or should not be governed in the future.

== Background ==
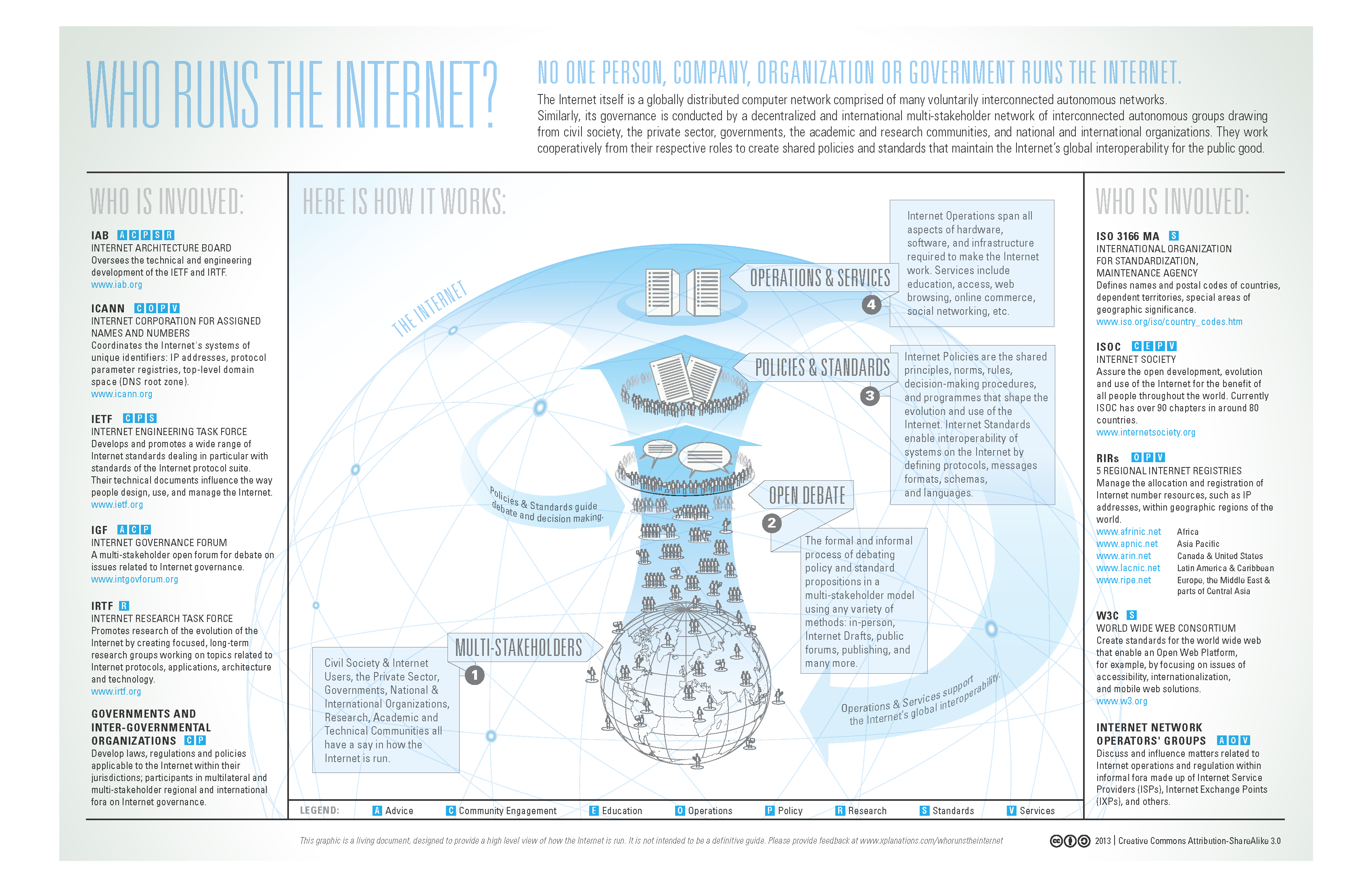
Who-Runs-the-Internet-graphic

No person, company, organization or government runs the Internet. It is a globally distributed network comprising many voluntarily interconnected autonomous networks. It operates without a central governing body with each constituent network setting and enforcing its own policies. Its governance is conducted by a decentralized and international multistakeholder network of interconnected autonomous groups drawing from civil society, the private sector, governments, the academic and research communities and national and international organizations. They work cooperatively from their respective roles to create shared policies and standards that maintain the Internet's global interoperability for the public good.

However, to help ensure interoperability, several key technical and policy aspects of the underlying core infrastructure and the principal namespaces are administered by the Internet Corporation for Assigned Names and Numbers (ICANN), which is headquartered in Los Angeles, California. ICANN oversees the assignment of globally unique identifiers on the Internet, including domain names, Internet protocol addresses, application port numbers in the transport protocols, and many other parameters. This seeks to create a globally unified namespace to ensure the global reach of the Internet. ICANN is governed by an international board of directors drawn from across the Internet's technical, business, academic, and other non-commercial communities.

There has been a long-held dispute over the management of the DNS root zone, whose final control fell under the supervision of the National Telecommunications and Information Administration (NTIA), an agency of the U.S. Department of Commerce. Considering that the U.S. Department of Commerce could unilaterally terminate the Affirmation of Commitments with ICANN, the authority of the DNS administration was likewise seen as revocable and derived from a single State, namely the United States. The involvement of NTIA started in 1998 and was supposed to be temporary, but it wasn't until April 2014 in an ICANN meeting held in Brazil, partly heated after Snowden revelations, that this situation changed resulting in an important shift of control transitioning administrative duties of the DNS root zones from NTIA to the Internet Assigned Numbers Authority (IANA) during a period that ended in September 2016.

The technical underpinning and standardization of the Internet's core protocols (IPv4 and IPv6) is an activity of the Internet Engineering Task Force (IETF), a non-profit organization of loosely affiliated international participants that anyone may associate with by contributing technical expertise.

On 23 November 1995, the United Nations-sponsored World Summit on the Information Society (WSIS), held in Tunis, established the Internet Governance Forum (IGF) to open an ongoing, non-binding conversation among multiple stakeholders about the future of Internet governance. Since WSIS, the term "Internet governance" has been broadened beyond narrow technical concerns to include a wider range of Internet-related policy issues.

In 2024, the OECD expanded policy resources on AI, including incident tracking and guidance for generative AI, to support multistakeholder internet governance debates.OECD AI Policy Observatory Portal

== Definition ==
The definition of Internet governance has been contested by differing groups across political and ideological lines. One of the main debates concerns certain actors' – such as national governments, corporate entities and civil society – participation in the Internet's governance, and their authority to play a role in it.

A working group established after a UN-initiated World Summit on the Information Society (WSIS) proposed the following definition of Internet governance as part of its June 2005 report:

Internet governance is the development and application by Governments, the private sector and civil society, in their respective roles, of shared principles, norms, rules, decision-making procedures, and programmes that shape the evolution and use of the Internet.

Law professor Yochai Benkler developed a conceptualization of Internet governance by the idea of three "layers" of governance:

- Physical infrastructure layer (through which information travels)
- Code or logical layer (controls the infrastructure)
- Content layer (contains the information signaled through the network)

Professors Jovan Kurbalija and Laura DeNardis also offer comprehensive definitions to "Internet Governance". According to Kurbalija, the broad approach to Internet Governance goes "beyond Internet infrastructural aspects and address other legal, economic, developmental, and sociocultural issues"; along similar lines, DeNardis argues that "Internet Governance generally refers to the policy and technical coordination issues related to the exchange of information over the Internet". One of the more policy-relevant questions today is exactly whether the regulatory responses are appropriate to police the content delivered through the Internet: it includes important rules for the improvement of Internet safety and for dealing with threats such as cyber-bullying, copyright infringement, data protection and other illegal or disruptive activities.

Internet governance now constitutes a college-level field of study with many syllabi available.

== History ==
The original ARPANET is one of the components which eventually evolved to become the Internet. As its name suggests the ARPANET was sponsored by the Defense Advanced Research Projects Agency within the U.S. Department of Defense. During the development of ARPANET, a numbered series of Request for Comments (RFCs) memos documented technical decisions and methods of working as they evolved. The standards of today's Internet are still documented by RFCs.

Between 1984 and 1986 the U.S. National Science Foundation (NSF) created the NSFNET backbone, using TCP/IP, to connect their supercomputing facilities. NSFNET became a general-purpose research network, a hub to connect the supercomputing centers to each other and to the regional research and education networks that would in turn connect campus networks. The combined networks became generally known as the Internet. By the end of 1989, Australia, Germany, Israel, Italy, Japan, Mexico, the Netherlands, New Zealand, and the UK were connected to the Internet, which had grown to contain more than 160,000 hosts.

In 1990, the ARPANET was formally terminated. In 1991 the NSF began to relax its restrictions on commercial use on NSFNET and commercial network providers began to interconnect. The final restrictions on carrying commercial traffic ended on 30 April 1995, when the NSF ended its sponsorship of the NSFNET Backbone Service and the service ended. Today almost all Internet infrastructure in the United States, and large portion in other countries, is provided and owned by the private sector. Traffic is exchanged between these networks, at major interconnection points, in accordance with established Internet standards and commercial agreements.

== Governors ==
During 1979 the Internet Configuration Control Board was founded by DARPA to oversee the network's development. During 1984 it was renamed the Internet Advisory Board (IAB), and during 1986 it became the Internet Activities Board.

The Internet Engineering Task Force (IETF) was formed during 1986 by the U.S. government to develop and promote Internet standards. It consisted initially of researchers, but by the end of the year participation was available to anyone, and its business was performed largely by email.

From the early days of the network until his death during 1998, Jon Postel oversaw address allocation and other Internet protocol numbering and assignments in his capacity as Director of the Computer Networks Division at the Information Sciences Institute of the University of Southern California, under a contract from the Department of Defense. This function eventually became known as the Internet Assigned Numbers Authority (IANA), and as it expanded to include management of the global Domain Name System (DNS) root servers, a small organization grew. Postel also served as RFC Editor.

Allocation of IP addresses was delegated to five regional Internet registries (RIRs):

- American Registry for Internet Numbers (ARIN) for North America
- Réseaux IP Européens - Network Coordination Centre (RIPE NCC) for Europe, the Middle East, and Central Asia
- Asia-Pacific Network Information Centre (APNIC) for Asia and the Pacific region
- Latin American and Caribbean Internet Addresses Registry (LACNIC) for Latin America and the Caribbean region
- African Network Information Center (AfriNIC) was created in 2004 to manage allocations for Africa

After Jon Postel's death in 1998, IANA became part of ICANN, a California nonprofit established in September 1998 by the U.S. government and awarded a contract by the U.S. Department of Commerce. Initially two board members were elected by the Internet community at large, though this was changed by the rest of the board in 2002 in a poorly attended public meeting in Accra, Ghana.

In 1992 the Internet Society (ISOC) was founded, with a mission to "assure the open development, evolution and use of the Internet for the benefit of all people throughout the world". Its members include individuals (anyone may join) as well as corporations, organizations, governments, and universities. The IAB was renamed the Internet Architecture Board, and became part of ISOC. The Internet Engineering Task Force also became part of the ISOC. The IETF is overseen currently by the Internet Engineering Steering Group (IESG), and longer-term research is carried on by the Internet Research Task Force and overseen by the Internet Research Steering Group.

At the first World Summit on the Information Society in Geneva in 2003, the topic of Internet governance was discussed. ICANN's status as a private corporation under contract to the U.S. government created controversy among other governments, especially Brazil, China, South Africa, and some Arab states. Since no general agreement existed even on the definition of what comprised Internet governance, United Nations Secretary General Kofi Annan initiated a Working Group on Internet Governance (WGIG) to clarify the issues and report before the second part of the World Summit on the Information Society (WSIS) in Tunis 2005. After much controversial debate, during which the U.S. delegation refused to consider surrendering the U.S. control of the Root Zone file, participants agreed on a compromise to allow for wider international debate on the policy principles. They agreed to establish an Internet Governance Forum (IGF), to be convened by the United Nations Secretary General before the end of the second quarter of 2006. The Greek government volunteered to host the first such meeting.

Annual global IGFs have been held since 2006, with the Forum renewed for five years by the United Nations General Assembly in December 2010. In addition to the annual global IGF, regional IGFs have been organized in Africa, the Arab region, Asia-Pacific, and Latin America and the Caribbean, as well as in sub-regions. in December 2015, the United Nations General Assembly renewed the IGF for another ten years, in the context of the WSIS 10-year overall review.

== Media Freedom ==
Media, freedom of expression and freedom of information have been long recognized as principles of internet governance, included in the 2003 Geneva Declaration and 2005 Tunis Commitment of the World Summit on the Information Society (WSIS). Given the crossborder, decentralized nature of the internet, an enabling environment for media freedom in the digital age requires global multi-stakeholder cooperation and shared respect for human rights. In broad terms, two different visions have been seen to shape global internet governance debates in recent years: fragmentation versus common principles.

Internet Universality and the ROAM principles

On the one hand, some national governments, particularly in the Central and Eastern European and Asia-Pacific regions, have emphasized state sovereignty as an organizing premise of national and global internet governance. In some regions, data localization laws—requiring that data be stored, processed and circulated within a given jurisdiction—have been introduced to keep citizens' personal data in the country, both to retain regulatory authority over such data and to strengthen the case for greater jurisdiction. Countries in the Central and Eastern European, Asia-Pacific, and African regions all have legislation requiring some localization. Data localization requirements increase the likelihood of multiple standards and the fragmentation of the internet, limiting the free flow of information, and in some cases increasing the potential for surveillance, which in turn impacts on freedom of expression.

On the other hand, the dominant practice has been towards a unified, universal internet with broadly shared norms and principles. The NETmundial meeting, held in Brazil in 2014, produced a multistakeholder statement the 'internet should continue to be a globally coherent, interconnected, stable, unfragmented, scalable and accessible network-of-networks.' In 2015, UNESCO's General Conference endorsed the concept of Internet Universality and the 'ROAM Principles', which state that the internet should be ‘(i) Human Rights-based (ii) Open, (iii) Accessible to all, and (iv) Nurtured by Multistakeholder participation’. The ROAM Principles combine standards for process (multi-stakeholderism to avoid potential capture of the internet by a single power center with corresponding risks), with recommendations about substance (what those principles should be). The fundamental position is for a global internet where ROAM principles frame regional, national and local diversities. In this context, significant objectives are media freedom, network interoperability, net neutrality and the free flow of information (minimal barriers to the rights to receive and impart information across borders, and any limitations to accord with international standards).

In a study of 30 key initiatives aimed at establishing a bill of rights online during the period between 1999 and 2015, researchers at Harvard's Berkman Klein Center found that the right to freedom of expression online was protected in more documents (26) than any other right. The UN General Assembly committed itself to multistakeholderism in December 2015 through a resolution extending the WSIS process and IGF mandate for an additional decade. It further underlined the importance of human rights and media-related issues such as the safety of journalists.

Growing support for the multistakeholder model was also observed in the Internet Assigned Numbers Authority (IANA) stewardship transition, in which oversight of the internet's addressing system shifted from a contract with the United States Department of Commerce to a new private sector entity with new multi-stakeholder accountability mechanisms. Another support of the multistakeholder approach has been the Tallinn Manual 2.0 on the International Law Applicable to Cyber Operations, the updated and considerably expanded second edition of the 2013 Tallinn Manual on the International Law Applicable to Cyber Warfare. The annual conferences linked to the Budapest Convention on Cybercrime and meetings of the United Nations Group of Governmental Experts on Developments in the Field of Information and Telecommunications in the Context of International Security, mandated by the United Nations General Assembly, have deliberated on norms such as protection of critical infrastructure and the application of international law to cyberspace.

In the period 2012–2016, the African Union passed the Convention on Cyber Security and Personal Data Protection and the Commonwealth Secretariat adopted the Report of the Working Group of Experts on Cybercrime.

The Economic Community of West African States (ECOWAS) compelled all 15 member states to implement data protection laws and authorities through the adoption of the Supplementary Act on Personal Data Protection in 2010. Again in 2011, the ECOWAS adopted a Directive on Fighting Cybercrime to combat growing Cybercrime activities in the West African region. In response to the growing need for ICT infrastructures, Cybersecurity, and increasing Cybercrime, the ECOWAS, on 18 January 2021, adopted the regional strategy for Cybersecurity and the fight against Cybercrime.

In a bid to unify data protection across Europe and give data subjects autonomy over their data, the European Union implemented the General Data Protection Regulation on 25 May 2018. It replaced the insufficient Data Protection Directive of 1995. The EU describes it as the "toughest privacy and security law" globally. Under the GDPR, data subjects have the right of access, rectification, erasure, restriction of processing, profiling, object to automated processing, and data portability.

== Internet Encryption ==
Privacy and security online have been of paramount concern to internet users with growing cybercrime and cyberattacks worldwide. A 2019 poll by Safety Monitor shows that 13 percent of people aged 15 and above have been victims of cybercrimes such as identity fraud, hacking, and cyberbullying in the Netherlands. INTERPOL recommends using encrypted internet to stay safe online. Encryption technology serves as a channel to ensuring privacy and security online. It is one of the strongest tools to help internet users globally stay secured on the internet, especially in the aspect of data protection. However, criminals leverage the privacy, security, and confidentiality of online encryption technology to perpetrate cybercrimes and sometimes be absolved of its legal criminal consequences. It has sparked debates between internet governors and governments of various countries on whether encryption technology should stay or its use stopped.

The UK Government, in May 2021, proposed the Online Safety Bill, a new regulatory framework to address cyberattacks and cybercrimes in the UK, but without a strong encryption technology. This is in a bid to make the UK the safest place to use the internet in the world and curb the damaging effect of harmful content shared online, including child pornography. However, the Internet Society argues that a lack of strong encryption exposes internet users to even greater risks of cyber attacks, cybercrimes, adding that it overrides data protection laws.

== Globalization and governance controversy ==
=== Role of ICANN and the U.S. Department of Commerce ===
The position of the U.S. Department of Commerce as the controller of some aspects of the Internet gradually attracted criticism from those who felt that control should be more international. A hands-off philosophy by the Department of Commerce helped limit this criticism, but this was undermined in 2005 when the Bush administration intervened to help kill the .xxx top-level domain proposal, and, much more severely, following the 2013 disclosures of mass surveillance by the U.S. government.

When the IANA functions were handed over to ICANN, a new U.S. nonprofit, controversy increased. ICANN's decision-making process was criticised by some observers as being secretive and unaccountable. When the directors' posts which had previously been elected by the "at-large" community of Internet users were abolished, some feared that ICANN would become illegitimate and its qualifications questionable, due to the fact that it was now losing the aspect of being a neutral governing body. ICANN stated that it was merely streamlining decision-making, and developing a structure suitable for the modern Internet. On 1 October 2015, following a community-led process spanning months, the stewardship of the IANA functions were transitioned to the global Internet community.

Other topics of controversy included the creation and control of generic top-level domains (.com, .org, and possible new ones, such as .biz or .xxx), the control of country-code domains, recent proposals for a large increase in ICANN's budget and responsibilities, and a proposed "domain tax" to pay for the increase.

There were also suggestions that individual governments should have more control, or that the International Telecommunication Union or the United Nations should have a function in Internet governance.

=== IBSA proposal (2011) ===
One controversial proposal to this effect, resulting from a September 2011 summit among India, Brazil, and South Africa (IBSA), would seek to move Internet governance into a "UN Committee on Internet-Related Policy" (UN-CIRP). The move was a reaction to a perception that the principles of the 2005 Tunis Agenda for the Information Society had not been met. The statement called for the subordination of independent technical organizations such as ICANN and the ITU to a political organization operating under the auspices of the United Nations. After outrage from India's civil society and media, the Indian government backed away from the proposal.

=== Montevideo Statement on the Future of Internet Cooperation (2013) ===
On 7 October 2013 the Montevideo Statement on the Future of Internet Cooperation was released by the leaders of a number of organizations involved in coordinating the Internet's global technical infrastructure, loosely known as the "I*" (or "I-star") group. Among other things, the statement "expressed strong concern over the undermining of the trust and confidence of Internet users globally due to recent revelations of pervasive monitoring and surveillance" and "called for accelerating the globalization of ICANN and IANA functions, towards an environment in which all stakeholders, including all governments, participate on an equal footing". This desire to move away from a United States centric approach is seen as a reaction to the ongoing NSA surveillance scandal. The statement was signed by the heads of the Internet Corporation for Assigned Names and Numbers (ICANN), the Internet Engineering Task Force, the Internet Architecture Board, the World Wide Web Consortium, the Internet Society, and the five regional Internet address registries (African Network Information Center, American Registry for Internet Numbers, Asia-Pacific Network Information Centre, Latin America and Caribbean Internet Addresses Registry, and Réseaux IP Européens Network Coordination Centre).

=== Global Multistakeholder Meeting on the Future of Internet Governance (NetMundial) (2013) ===
In October 2013, Fadi Chehadé, former president and CEO of ICANN, met with Brazilian president Dilma Rousseff in Brasilia. Upon Chehadé's invitation, the two announced that Brazil would host an international summit on Internet governance in April 2014. The announcement came after the 2013 disclosures of mass surveillance by the U.S. government, and President Rousseff's speech at the opening session of the 2013 United Nations General Assembly, where she strongly criticized the U.S. surveillance program as a "breach of international law". The "Global Multistakeholder Meeting on the Future of Internet Governance (NETMundial)" will include representatives of government, industry, civil society, and academia. At the IGF VIII meeting in Bali in October 2013 a commentator noted that Brazil intends the meeting to be a "summit" in the sense that it will be high level with decision-making authority. The organizers of the "NETmundial" meeting have decided that an online forum called "/1net", set up by the I* group, will be a major conduit of non-governmental input into the three committees preparing for the meeting in April.

NetMundial managed to convene a large number of global actors to produce a consensus statement on internet governance principles and a roadmap for the future evolution of the internet governance ecosystem. NETmundial Multistakeholder Statement – the outcome of the Meeting – was elaborated in an open and participatory manner, by means of successive consultations. This consensus should be qualified in that even though the statement was adopted by consensus, some participants, specifically the Russian Federation, India, Cuba, and ARTICLE 19, representing some participants from civil society expressed some dissent with its contents and the process.

=== NetMundial Initiative (2014) ===
The NetMundial Initiative is an initiative by ICANN CEO Fadi Chehade along with representatives of the World Economic Forum (WEF) and the Brazilian Internet Steering Committee (Comitê Gestor da Internet no Brasil), commonly referred to as "CGI.br"., which was inspired by the 2014 NetMundial meeting. Brazil's close involvement derived from accusations of digital espionage against then-president Dilma Rousseff.

A month later, the Panel On Global Internet Cooperation and Governance Mechanisms (convened by the Internet Corporation for Assigned Names and Numbers (ICANN) and the World Economic Forum (WEF) with assistance from The Annenberg Foundation), supported and included the NetMundial statement in its own report.

=== End of U.S. Department of Commerce oversight ===
On 1 October 2016 ICANN ended its contract with the United States Department of Commerce National Telecommunications and Information Administration (NTIA).

This marked a historic moment in the history of the Internet. The contract between ICANN and the U.S. Department of Commerce National Telecommunications and Information Administration (NTIA) for performance of the Internet Assigned Numbers Authority, or IANA, functions, drew its roots from the earliest days of the Internet. Initially the contract was seen as a temporary measure, according to Lawrence Strickling, U.S. Assistant Secretary of Commerce for Communications and Information from 2009 to 2017.

Internet users saw no change or difference in their experience online as a result of what ICANN and others called the IANA Stewardship Transition. As Stephen D. Crocker, ICANN Board Chair from 2011 to 2017, said in a news release at the time of the contract expiration, “This community validated the multistakeholder model of Internet governance. It has shown that a governance model defined by the inclusion of all voices, including business, academics, technical experts, civil society, governments and many others is the best way to assure that the Internet of tomorrow remains as free, open, and accessible as the Internet of today.”

The concerted effort began in March 2014, when NTIA asked ICANN to convene the global multistakeholder community – made up of private-sector representatives, technical experts, academics, civil society, governments and individual Internet end users – to come together and create a proposal to replace NTIA’s historic stewardship role. The community, in response to the NTIA’s request for a proposal, said that they wanted to enhance ICANN’s accountability mechanisms as well. NTIA later agreed to consider proposals for both together.

People involved in global Internet governance worked for nearly two years to develop two consensus-based proposals. Stakeholders spent more than 26,000 working hours on the proposal, exchanged more than 33,000 messages on mailing lists, held more than 600 meetings and calls and incurred millions of dollars of legal fees to develop the plan, which the community completed, and ICANN submitted to NTIA for review in March 2016.

On 24 May 2016, the U.S. Senate Commerce Committee held its oversight hearing on "Examining the Multistakeholder Plan for Transitioning the Internet Assigned Number Authority.” Though the Senators present expressed support for the transition, a few expressed concerns that the accountability mechanisms in the proposal should be tested during an extension of the NTIA’s contract with ICANN.

Two weeks later, U.S. Senator Ted Cruz introduced the “Protecting Internet Freedom Act,” a bill to prohibit NTIA from allowing the IANA functions contract to lapse unless authorized by Congress. The bill never left the Senate Committee on Commerce, Science, and Transportation.

On 9 June 2016, NTIA, after working with other U.S. Government agencies to conduct a thorough review, announced that the proposal package developed by the global Internet multistakeholder community met the criteria it had outlined in March 2014. In summary, NTIA found that the proposal package:

- Supported and enhanced the multistakeholder model because it was developed by a multistakeholder process that engaged Internet stakeholders around the world, and built on existing multistakeholder arrangements, processes, and concepts.
- Maintained the security, stability, and resiliency of the Internet DNS because it relied on ICANN’s current operational practices to perform the IANA functions. The proposed accountability and oversight provisions bolstered the ability of Internet stakeholders to ensure ongoing security, stability, and resiliency.
- Met the needs and expectations of the global customers and partners of the IANA services because it was directly created by those customers and partners of the IANA functions. The accountability recommendations ensured that ICANN would perform in accordance with the will of the multistakeholder community.
- Maintained the openness of the Internet because it required that the IANA functions, databases, operations, and related policymaking remain fully open and accessible, just as they were prior to the transition.

The vast proposals required various changes to ICANN’s structure and Bylaws, which ICANN and its various stakeholder groups completed in advance of 30 September 2016, the date at which the IANA functions contract was set to expire.

=== Paris Call for Trust and Security in Cyberspace ===
On 12 November 2018 at the Internet Governance Forum (IGF) meeting in Paris, French President Emmanuel Macron launched the Paris Call for Trust and Security in Cyberspace. This high-level declaration presents a framework of common principles for regulating the Internet and fighting back against cyber attacks, hate speech and other cyber threats.

=== Council on Foreign Relations task force report no. 80 (2022) ===
In May 2022, the Council on Foreign Relations completed its Independent Task Force Report No. 80, "Confronting Reality in Cyberspace: Foreign Policy for a Fragmented Internet" recommending that the U.S.reconsider its cyber, digital trade and online freedom policies that champion a free and open internet, as having failed.

=== NCSC ransomware speech at Tel Aviv Cyber Week (2022) ===
During the 12th annual Tel Aviv Cyber Week in 2022, UK National Cyber Security Centre (NCSC) CEO Lindy Cameron underlined, as did others, that the pervasiveness of ransomware is the primary cyber threat to global security, and quickly evolving.

== Internet Shutdowns ==
Internet shutdowns refer to when state authorities deliberately shut down the internet. In other cases, Internet shutdown could describe intentional acts by state authorities to slow down internet connections. Other terms used to describe internet shutdown include 'blanket shutdown,' 'kill switches,' 'blackout,' 'digital curfews.' Shutdowns could be for only a few hours, days, weeks, and sometimes months. Governments often justify internet shutdowns on grounds of public safety, prevention of mass hysteria, hate speech, fake news, national security, and sometimes for transparency of an ongoing electioneering process. However, reports indicate that shutdowns are a deliberate attempt at internet censorship by the governments. Apart from posing great harm to internet freedom, the shutdown of the internet harms public health, economies, educational systems, internet advancements, vulnerable groups, and democratic societies. This is because they impede on public communication through the internet for a while, thereby putting many activities at a standstill.

In the past years, no fewer than 35 countries have experienced internet shutdowns. According to reports by Access Now, a non-profit digital right group, 25 countries across the globe experienced government-induced internet shutdown 196 times in 2018. In 2019, Access Now reports indicated that 33 countries experienced a government-induced internet shutdown 213 times. The 2020 report from the digital right group implied that 29 countries deliberately shut down their internet 155 times. With the growing trend of internet shutdowns, digital rights groups, including Internet Society, Access Now, #KeepItOn Coalition, and others have condemned it, noting it is an 'infringement on digital rights' of netizens. These groups have also been at the forefront of tracking and reporting shutdowns in real-time as well as analyzing its impact on internet advancement, internet freedom, and societies.

In 2024, a total of 54 countries experienced internet shutdowns, with Thailand, Malaysia, and France among the nations that joined this list. This brought the cumulative total of internet shutdowns induced by government agencies to 296. Notably, platform X was reported as one of the most blocked services, facing restrictions in 35 countries. Myanmar's military regime, under its new leadership, was responsible for the highest number of shutdowns, implementing 85 outages and leading global reports on internet disruptions. Authorities worldwide have increasingly resorted to internet shutdowns, reflecting a 35% increase in country participation compared to 2022.

== Internet bodies ==
- Global Commission on Internet Governance, launched in January 2014 by two international think tanks, the Centre for International Governance Innovation and Chatham House, to make recommendations about the future of global Internet governance.
- International Organization for Standardization, Maintenance Agency (ISO 3166 MA): Defines names and postal codes of countries, dependent territories, special areas of geographic significance. To date it has only played a minor role in developing Internet standards.
- Internet Architecture Board (IAB): Oversees the technical and engineering development of the IETF and IRTF.
- Internet Corporation for Assigned Names and Numbers (ICANN): Coordinates the Internet's systems of unique identifiers: IP addresses, Protocol-Parameter registries, top-level domain space (DNS root zone). Performs Internet Assigned Numbers Authority (IANA) functions for the global Internet community.
- Internet Engineering Task Force (IETF): Develops and promotes a wide range of Internet standards dealing in particular with standards of the Internet protocol suite. Their technical documents influence the way people design, use and manage the Internet.
- Internet Governance Forum (IGF): A multistakeholder forum for policy dialogue.
- Internet Research Task Force (IRTF): Promotes research of the evolution of the Internet by creating focused, long-term research groups working on Internet protocols, applications, architecture, and technology.
- Internet network operators' groups (NOGs): informal groups established to provide forums for network operators to discuss matters of mutual interest.
- Internet Society (ISOC): Assures the open development, evolution, and use of the Internet for the benefit of all people throughout the world. Currently ISOC has over 90 chapters in around 80 countries.
- Number Resource Organization (NRO): Established in October 2003, the NRO is an unincorporated organization uniting the five regional Internet registries.
- Regional Internet registries (RIRs): There are five regional Internet registries. They manage the allocation and registration of Internet number resources, such as IP addresses, within geographic regions of the world. (Africa: www.afrinic.net; Asia Pacific: www.apnic.net; Canada and United States: www.arin.net; Latin America & Caribbean: www.lacnic.net; Europe, the Middle East and parts of Central Asia: www.ripe.net)
- World Wide Web Consortium (W3C): Creates standards for the World Wide Web that enable an Open Web Platform, for example, by focusing on issues of accessibility, internationalization, and mobile web solutions.

=== United Nations bodies ===
- Internet Governance Forum (IGF)
  - IGF regional, national, and subject area initiatives
  - Commission on Science and Technology for Development (CSTD) Working Group on Improvements to the IGF (CSTDWG), active from February 2011 to May 2012.
- International Telecommunication Union (ITU)
  - World Conference on International Telecommunications (WCIT), a treaty-level conference facilitated by the ITU to address international telecommunications regulations, held in December 2012 in Dubai.
- World Summit on the Information Society (WSIS), summits held in 2003 (Geneva) and 2005 (Tunis).
  - WSIS Forum, annual meetings held in Geneva starting in 2006 as a follow-up of the WSIS Geneva Plan of Action.
  - WSIS+10, a high-level event and extended version of the WSIS Forum to take stock of achievements in the last 10 years and develop proposals for a new vision beyond 2015, held from 13 to 17 April 2014 in Sharm El Sheikh, Egypt.
- Working Group on Internet Governance (WGIG), active from September 2004 to November 2005.

== See also ==
- Digital constitutionalism
- History of the Internet
- Internet law
- Internet organizations
- Internet censorship
- Internet multistakeholder governance

== Sources ==
This article incorporates text from a free content work. Licensed under CC BY SA 3.0 IGO (license statement/permission). Text taken from World Trends in Freedom of Expression and Media Development Global Report 2017/2018, UNESCO.
