= Khaled Koubaa =

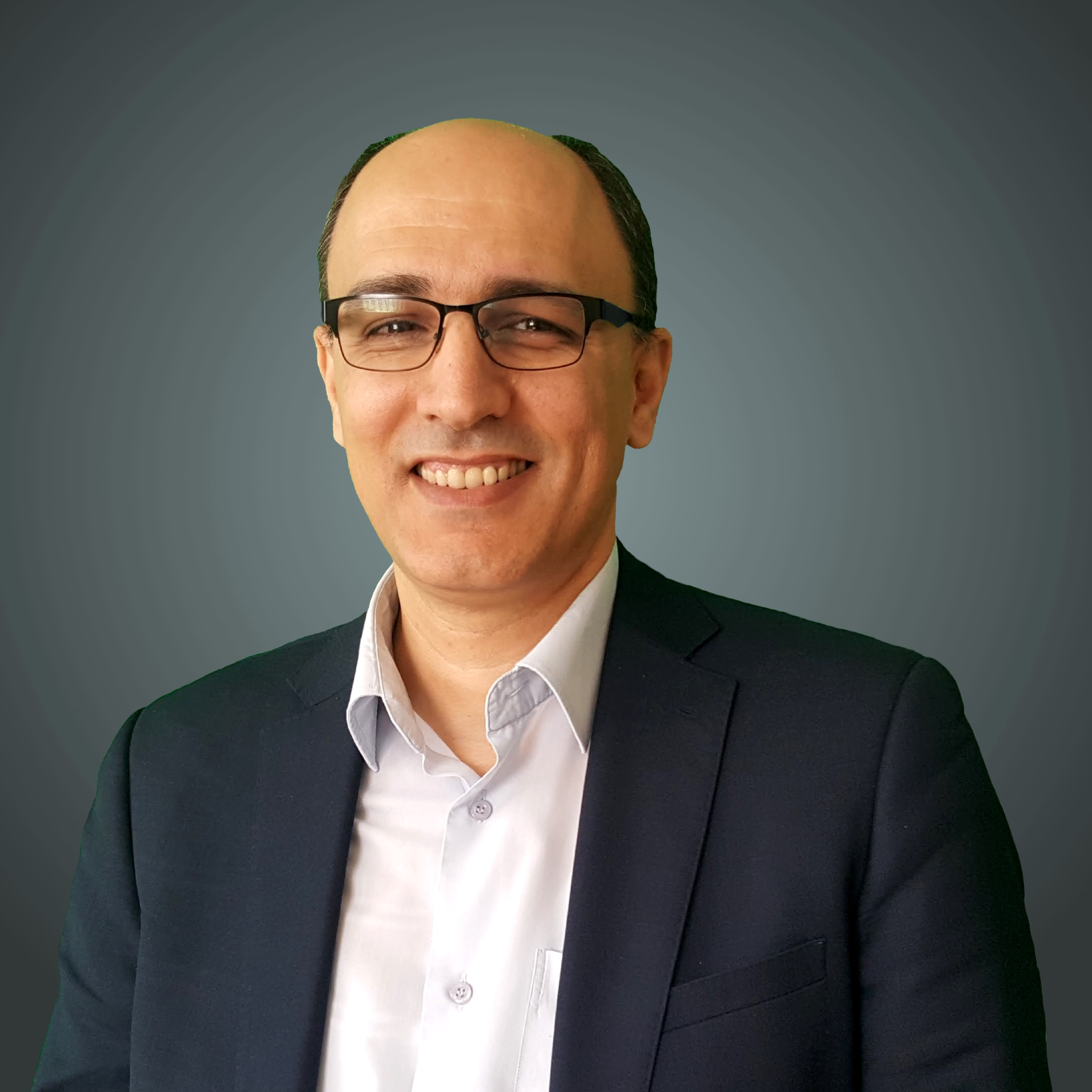
- Khaled Koubaa
- Born: September 19, 1973 (age 51); Sfax, Tunisia
- Occupation(s): CEO, International Internet governance Expert
- Employer(s): AT Worthy Technology, Inc.

Khaled Koubaa (Arabic: خالد قوبعة, born September 19, 1973, in Sfax) is an international Internet governance expert and CEO of AT Worthy Technology, Inc.

== Biography ==
=== Education ===
Khaled Koubaa completed his secondary education at the Lycée 9-Avril in Sfax before continuing his university studies at the École Supérieure de Commerce de Tunis, where he obtained a bachelor's degree in management, which he completed with a master's degree in e-commerce from the École Supérieure de Commerce Électronique de La Manouba.

Khaled Koubaa holds an Executive Certificate in Public Leadership from the Harvard Kennedy School and has completed various programs in fields such as the Metaverse, FinTech Law, Privacy Law, and International Cyber Conflicts from leading institutions, including the Wharton School and Duke University.

=== Career ===
Before joining Google in 2012, where he led the government relations and public policy work in the Middle East and North Africa, Khaled Koubaa worked mainly as a consultant in new technologies and social media for several governments and organizations in the Arab region and Africa.

He founded and chaired the Tunisian chapter of the Internet Society in 2006, before joining its international board of directors in 2009. He is also served as a member of the AfriNIC board of directors.

In 2016, he was selected for a three-year term as a member of the board of directors of ICANN, the global Internet regulatory authority. Khaled served also as member of the World Bank’s Expert Advisory Council on Citizen Engagement.

In 2019, he joined Facebook to serve as a manager of public policy.

On November 17, 2020, he was appointed by the UN Secretary General to the Multistakeholder Advisory Group as a member representing the private sector.

=== Personal life ===
Khaled Koubaa is married and has two children.

According to Koubaa, the Internet has played an important role in his personal life as he met his wife online and also saw his daughter for the first time online.
