= Nitin Desai =

Indian economist

Nitin Dayalji Desai

Under Secretary General, Department of Economic and Social Affairs, United Nations
- In office December 1992 – August 2003
- Succeeded by: Jose Antonio Ocampo

Personal details
- Born: 5 July 1941 (age 85) Mumbai
- Spouse: Aditi Gupta
- Education: University of Mumbai; London School of Economics
- Occupation: Civil servant Economist

Nitin Desai is an Indian economist and international civil servant. He was under-secretary-general for Economic and Social Affairs of the United Nations from 1992 to 2003.

== Early life and academic career ==
He was born to Dayalji M. and Shantaben Desai in 1941. He studied at St. Xavier's High School and Elphinstone College in Mumbai. He received a bachelor's degree from the University of Bombay in 1962 and, in 1965, earned a master's degree in economics from the London School of Economics and Political Science.

Desai lectured in economics at the University of Liverpool and the University of Southampton in the United Kingdom from 1965 to 1970. Returning to India, he worked as a consultant for the then nascent Tata Economic Consultancy Services from 1970 to 1973. His major work here was on the economic analysis of CIDCO's Twin City project.

== Career ==
=== Government of India ===
Desai began his government career in 1973 in the Planning Commission of the Government of India where he served in various capacities. His principal work there was the establishment of a system of cost-benefit appraisal of public investment projects. He was also involved in energy policy work and was on the board of Indian Oil Corporation. He was the member-secretary of the National Commission on the Development of Backward Areas. In 1983 he served concurrently as secretary of the Economic Advisory Council to the prime minister of India.

=== Brundtland Commission and Ministry of Finance ===
From September 1985 to March 1987, he served as senior economic adviser for the World Commission on Environment and Development (the Brundtland Commission), where he introduced the concept of sustainable development and was responsible for drafting the key chapters dealing with this aspect in the report of the Commission "Our Common Future".

Returning to India in 1987, Desai was made special secretary in the Planning Commission and, in 1988, secretary and chief economic adviser in the Department of Economic Affairs, Ministry of Finance. In the latter capacity he coordinated the preparations for the 1989 and the 1990 budgets of the Central Government.

=== United Nations ===
In 1990, Desai's services were requested by the United Nations. From 1990 to 1993, he was the deputy secretary-general of the United Nations Conference on Environment and Development (1992 Rio Earth Summit). In that capacity one of his primary responsibilities was to co-ordinate the work of the Secretariat related to the development of Agenda 21, the principal programmatic outcome of the conference.

In early 1993 the then United Nations secretary-general established three new departments at United Nations Headquarters in the economic, social and related fields. In February 1993 he appointed Nitin Desai at the under-secretary-general level to head the newly created Department for Policy Coordination and Sustainable Development. The substantive work of this department supported the various United Nations intergovernmental bodies, including the Economic and Social Council, and the Commission on Sustainable Development.

In March 1997, Secretary-General Kofi Annan appointed Desai to co-ordinate, and subsequently head, the consolidated Department of Economic and Social Affairs which provided substantive support to the normative, analytical, statistical and relevant technical co-operation processes of the United Nations on the economic and social side. In that capacity Desai organised and managed the Copenhagen Summit on Social Development (1995) and the Monterrey Summit on Finance and Development (2002). Desai was also the convener of the Executive Committee on Economic and Social Affairs which brings together the heads of all the UN Secretariat entities directly concerned with economic, environmental and social issues.

In October 2001, the secretary-general asked Desai to act as secretary-general of the World Summit on Sustainable Development (2002 Johannesburg Summit). A special feature of this Summit was the focus on the developmental and environmental aspects of water, energy, agriculture, health and bio-diversity. The summit also led to practical partnerships between governments, international organisations, the private sector and non-governmental organizations to address these concerns. Desai undertook this task in addition to his existing responsibilities. At the end of August 2003, Desai retired from the UN but continued his association with the UN as a special adviser to the secretary general for the World Summit on the Information Society. In that capacity he chaired an international multi-stakeholder Working Group on Internet Governance.

== Other offices ==
Desai was a distinguished visiting fellow at the Centre for the Study of Global Governance at the London School of Economics and Political Science in 2003–04. In July 2004 Desai was inducted as an honorary fellow of the London School of Economics and Political Science.

In India, Desai has been involved in a variety of public policy activities. He chaired the Committee on Technical Innovation and Venture Capital set up by the Planning Commission, Government of India, in 2006. He is also the co-chair, along with Lord Chris Patten, of the India-UK Round Table set up by the two governments.

In 2008, Desai joined the Advisory Board of the carbon finance business IDEAcarbon.

Desai is associated with the Helsinki Process on Globalisation and Democracy and many academic organisations and non-governmental organizations dealing with economic, social and environmental issues as also security and foreign policy. He has published several articles and papers on development planning, regional economics, industry, energy and international economic relations. He writes a monthly column for the Business Standard, an economic daily published from Delhi.

In October 2012, Nitin Desai was elected chair of the Board of Trustees of Oxfam International, an international non-governmental organizations for an initial three-year term, beginning March 2013. He stepped down in October 2013 on health grounds.

== Personal life ==
Niti Desai married Aditi Gupta in 1979, and they have two children, Kartikeya and Nandan.
