= Tunis Commitment =

The Tunis Commitment was a consensus statement of the World Summit on the Information Society, adopted on November 18, 2005, in Tunis, Tunisia.

== See also ==
- Tunis Agenda for the Information Society
