= Digital constitutionalism =

Concept in law

Digital constitutionalism is a concept used in the context of research investigating the impact of digital technology on constitutional values and principles. As for the notion of constitutionalism, this concept has not received a univocal definition, having been referred to a movement, a set of instruments and an ideology. The notion of digital constitutionalism emerged in the context of the digital revolution that characterised the first decades of the Twenty First century. Current research is conducted by scholars from various disciplines, including law, communication studies, philosophy and political science. It focuses on the instruments and actors involved in promoting constitutional values and principles which are fit for the digital age.

== Definitions ==
In his theory of digital constitutionalism, Celeste argued that current literature “does not offer a unitary picture on the concept”. In particular there is a lack of consensus on the scope of digital constitutionalism.

=== Movement ===
Gill, Redeker, and Gasser define “digital constitutionalism” as a broad set of initiatives from a plurality of actors which have attempted to articulate a set of “political rights, governance norms, and limitations on the exercise of power on the internet”. They acknowledge that these articles lack a classic characteristic of constitutions as they do not have a “foundational position in the hierarchy of legal sources”, nevertheless, it is argued that they have “dimensions” of constitutionalism, those being a constitutional subject matter, a political community, and an aspiration towards formal recognition.

Yilma, on the other hand, presents Digital Constitutionalism as a collective label for a series of uncoordinated, sporadic and multilevel initiatives that seek to re-imagine age-old human rights and principles to a new age heralded by the Internet and allied technologies.

=== Ideology ===
According to Celeste, digital constitutionalism is an ‘ideology’ which aims to establish a normative framework for the protection of fundamental rights and balancing of power in the digital society. He stresses that the term ‘ideology’ is used in a neutral way to identify a structured set of values and ideals. Digital Constitutionalism requires broadening the scope of the original concept of constitutionalism in order to appreciate the existence of the power of private actors, along with the power of the public actors. Celeste believes that future actors should start analysing and comparing the different forms through which the process of constitutionalisation of the digital environment is taking place, especially in the hope of better understanding the reasons why constitutional responses are materialising in non-traditional contexts outside the state-centric dimension.

== Historical context ==
As with every considerable revolution in the past such as the French Revolution, the digital revolution that is occurring requires an overhaul of the law.

When looking at prior schools of legal thought which have emerged over the years, e.g sociological jurisprudence, it can be seen that each legal system is strictly related to societal changes and communities’ needs.

The role of the constitution is to guide each legal system for both the protection of human rights and the balancing of powers. Technology is in a constant state of development. These developments have “manifestly amplified” individuals’ chances to exercise their fundamental rights of expression and exchange of information, while also creating potential infringement on these rights. It also affects the balancing of powers with the emergence of private corporations as dominant actors alongside the acting powers of those states. As digital technology has generated alterations in the constitutional equilibrium it is becoming increasingly necessary to modify it to comply with the new challenges.

== Instruments ==
=== Internet Bills of Rights ===
Redeker, Gill and Gasser define Digital Constitutionalism as an "umbrella term" to connect a set of documents seeking to establish a Bill of Rights for the internet. The Internet Bills of Rights are not constitutions in the classic sense, but rather they are associated with constitutions as they share the core substantive aspects of constitutionalism, such as its values, problems, and principles, as well as its main function of limiting state powers and empowering institutions within the society. Examples for Internet bills of rights are the Santa Clara Principles, the African Declaration on Internet Rights and Freedoms, the Feminist Principles of the Internet, the Delhi Declaration for a Just and Equitable Internet, the Charter of Human Rights and Principles for the Internet and the Joint Declaration on Challenges to Freedom of Expression in the Next Decade.

=== Private law ===
Suzor’s theory strikes a more middling ground between the public-vs-private approaches towards digital constitutionalism seen in the other theorists. In his theory, the legal constitution plays an important role in guiding the development of a) contract law, and b) detailing the limits of private power in the digital sphere - however, it is up to private law and the private entities themselves, to place and enforce those principles.

=== Multilevel theory ===
Celeste proposes a multilevel theory that sees the simultaneous emergence of a plurality of normative responses that seek to address the challenges that the digital revolution generates in the constitutional ecosystem. These constitutional counteractions emerge at multiple levels: within and beyond the state.

== Research areas ==
=== Platform governance ===
A key issue within digital constitutionalisation is the role of private actors in this form of governance, particularly through enabling or disabling user’s rights. This allows these non-state bodies to perform public functions previously performed only by the state. Suzor’s theory of Digital Constitutionalism seeks to identify positive governance methods and limit the online power of both the state and private actors appropriately. According to Suzor, the use of the values such as the Rule of Law can be applied to protect individual rights such as freedom of expression and privacy in digital spaces. Suzor applies this framework to various social media platforms to contextualise his theory and the legitimacy of online contractual documents.
