= NetMundial Initiative =

The NETmundial Initiative (NMI) was a controversial effort to create a new platform for internet governance issues. The NMI was named after an internet governance conference held by the Brazilian government and DNS overseer ICANN in May 2014; it was intended to help turn the conference's final principles into action.

Despite the backing of both the US and Brazilian governments, the initiative ran into trouble almost immediately when it was revealed that the three lead organizers had decided to award themselves 'permanent seats' on its 25-member council, leading to comparisons with the United Nations' Security Council. Despite efforts by the organizers to respond to criticism, the initiative was rejected by a number of key internet organizations including the Internet Society and the Internet Architecture Board. As a result, two of the five proposed permanent seats were never taken up.

The initiative ran for 18 months until its 'mandate' ran out in July 2016. Just prior to that deadline, both ICANN and the World Economic Forum said they were withdrawing from the project. At a planning meeting, the US government representative called for the NMI to be shut down. ICANN and the WEF had contributed $200,000 each. Plans for re-election of council members were postponed and then cancelled. The remaining member - CGI.br - initially suggested it would continue the initiative in some form but in August 2016, the initiative announced an open call for a new group to take over the 'solutions map' that was its most significant work product.

== Background ==
The NETmundial meeting held in São Paulo, Brazil, in April 2014 saw 1,480 people from 97 countries come together to discuss internet governance issues in light of mass surveillance by the US government revealed by Edward Snowden. Attendees came from a wide range of sectors: government, private sector, civil society, technical community, and academia.

Its concluding, non-binding Multistakeholder Statement contained a shared set of Principles and a Roadmap to guide the evolution of Internet cooperation and governance. Months later, DNS overseer the Internet Corporation for Assigned Names and Numbers (ICANN), the Brazilian Internet Steering Committee (CGI.br), and the World Economic Forum (WEF) funded an 'initiative' named after the conference with the goal of working together to apply the NETmundial Principles to address Internet issues in concrete ways.

The NMI was launched in on 6 November 2014 as an "open source platform" and a "shared public resource" that would provide help to any "calls for assistance on non-technical issues." ICANN CEO Fadi Chehade said: "If there is a cybersecurity issue, or someone who has figured out how to protect children through a browser," then they could use the platform to connect with others as well as crowdsource and fund their efforts.

However plans announced at the same time to create a 25-member Inaugural Coordination Council on which the three organizers would give themselves "permanent seats" sparked immediate criticism and led to a lack of support that blighted all future efforts.

== Mission and scope ==
The NMI's self-created mission was to "provide a platform that helps catalyze practical cooperation between all stakeholders in order to address Internet issues and advance the implementation of the NETmundial Principles and Roadmap."

Its Terms of Reference, along with other guiding documents were developed based upon these principles and in consultation with the global Internet community. Its scope included promoting the application, evaluation, and implementation of these principles and operating as an impartial clearinghouse for information about governance issues. It planned to produce a platform on which diverse actors could present projects, solicit partners and establish collaborative relationships. It also hoped to facilitate participation in the Internet governance ecosystem, particularly by stakeholders from the developing world, and advances multistakeholder processes at the global, regional and national levels.

It noted that it would not act as a policy-making body, but would seek to complement and support existing Internet governance dialogue, processes and institutions including the Internet Governance Forum (IGF) and the global Internet technical community.

== Rationale and commitment ==
The Multistakeholder Statement generated at the initial NETmundial meeting in São Paulo, Brazil, in April 2014, identified a need to develop "operational solutions for current and future Internet Issues." The NMI vows to operate in a "multistakeholder, open, transparent and inclusive manner, as a part of the Internet governance ecosystem." Capacity building and financing are essential elements of the NMI's commitment to enabling diverse stakeholders to effectively participate in Internet governance development.

== Coordination Council ==
The NMI's inaugural Coordination Council composed of representatives from all stakeholder groups and geographies.

Members of the inaugural Council included prominent leaders in the Internet governance ecosystem. Nii Narku Quaynor, Jack Ma, Fadi Chehade, Richard Samans, Virgilio Almeida, Jean-François Abramatic, Lu Wei, and Secretary Penny Pritzker. Initially intended as a 25-member council, only 23 councillors were ever chosen after the two seats set aside for internet organizations and the Internet Governance Forum (IGF) were not taken up following rejection of the initiative.

The council was tasked with guiding the development of the initial phases of the NMI. It shut down in July 2016.

== Secretariat ==
A joint secretariat, formed by staff from the three organizing partners: The Brazilian Internet Steering Committee (CGI.br), the Internet Corporation for Assigned Names and Numbers (ICANN) and the World Economic Forum (WEF) carried out the administrative and secretarial tasks of the NMI.

== Council meetings ==
The inaugural meeting of the NMI council was postponed due to controversy over its formation and approach. An initial first meeting was planned for 19 January, just before the annual WEF meeting in Davos, Switzerland. It was cancelled however after internet groups refused to join and the business community sent a long list of questions about the initiative.

A first "working meeting" took place at Stanford University on March 31, 2015. Observers were refused entry and told the meeting would be live-streamed. The Coordination Council produced a draft Terms of Reference for public comment. Council members previewed the NETmundial Solutions Map and the two projects submitted to the NETmundial platform.

The results of the meeting went out for public comment and were met with 23 responses, most of them highly critical. The NMI Council "acknowledged the need to ensure that, as the Initiative develops further, it must adhere to the highest standards of transparency and inclusiveness, as well as expand its global reach." The Council agreed to take steps designed to promote "greater understanding and clarity about the Initiative's organization, role, and activities."

The inaugural Council meeting took place in São Paulo, Brazil, on June 30, 2015. The meeting was webcast and remote-participation enabled. Any observers that wished to be present were asked to send an "expression of interest" with spaces limited to 20 people. At it, the Council adopted the Terms of Reference and adopted an operations and governance framework plus an initial approach to provide support for projects through the online collaboration platform. The Council endorsed the NETmundial Solutions Map and Collaborations Platform and discussed a third proposed activity of establishing a space for sharing best practices on local multistakeholder Internet governance structures in order to support "capacity development efforts for developing-country communities, governments and underserved stakeholders."

== Controversy ==
The NMI faced controversy from the moment it was first announced and a failure of all major internet organizations (with the exception of organizer ICANN) to support the initiative led to its inevitable decline and collapse.

Leading up to and following the initial scoping meeting of NMI in Geneva, Switzerland in August 2014, several participants expressed concerns over NMI's proposed organization and activities. Those concerns intensified following the official launch in November of that year. ISOC, the IAB and ICC BASIS published statements outlining their concerns. One main civil society expressed qualified support. while another was openly hostile toward the initiative.

Business lobbying group NetChoice said the initiative lacked proper backing and called on ICANN to end its leadership of the NMI. The Electronic Frontier Foundation (EFF) called it flawed, closed, top-down and opaque. And a session at the annual Internet Governance Forum was titled: "Should we support the NetMundial Initiative?"

A joint statement between ICANN and ISOC, following a meeting between the two organization in light of ISOC's rejection of the initiative read: “We had a very constructive, frank, and candid discussion on Internet Governance that included the NETmundial Initiative (NMI). On NMI we did not resolve all of the outstanding issues. The ISOC attendees, the IAB and IETF chairs would rather see the structure defined after setting the terms of reference and scope of the work. More work needs to be done by NMI and with the various committees involved.”

According to Julia Pohle in the Global Policy Journal, there were three main controversial issues surrounding NMI raised by civil society and the technical community: permanent seats on the NMI Council, potential interference with the UN Internet Governance Forum (IGF) and concern over disproportionate involvement in decision-making by economic and political elite. NMI retracted the notion of permanent seats on the Council, and said it would support the efforts of the IGF as well as address concerns regarding adherence to bottom-up, multistakeholder consensus-driven governance.

However, with a continuing lack of support and even outright hostility toward the idea by the very stakeholders that the NetMundial Initiative purported to represent, the organization faded. When ICANN and the WEF withdrew their financial support for the initiative, planned council elections were cancelled and proposed meetings to look into reviving the approach never happened.
