= Internet universality =

UNESCO concept and framework

Internet universality is a concept and framework adopted by UNESCO in 2015 to summarize their position on the internet. The concept recognizes that "the Internet is much more than infrastructure and applications; it is a network of economic and social interactions and relationships, which has the potential to enable human rights, empower individuals and communities, and facilitate sustainable development." The concept is based on four principles agreed upon by UNESCO member states: human rights, openness, accessibility, and multi-stakeholder participation, abbreviated as the R-O-A-M principles.

Through the concept of internet universality, UNESCO highlights four fields of internet policy and practice: access to information and knowledge, freedom of expression, privacy, ethics and behavior online. The principles represent a tool for UNESCO to understand internet governance through the internet universality indicators.

== History ==
The term was agreed upon by UNESCO's General Conference in 2015 to integrate UNESCO's work into the framework of the World Summit on the Information Society (WSIS). It is part of UNESCO's project to fulfil the 2030 Agenda for Sustainable Development. During the 37th session of the General Conference, UNESCO Member States affirmed the principle of the applicability of human rights in cyberspace. The concept of internet universality was then built upon the 'CONNECTing the dots' conference outcome document on 3–4 March 2015.

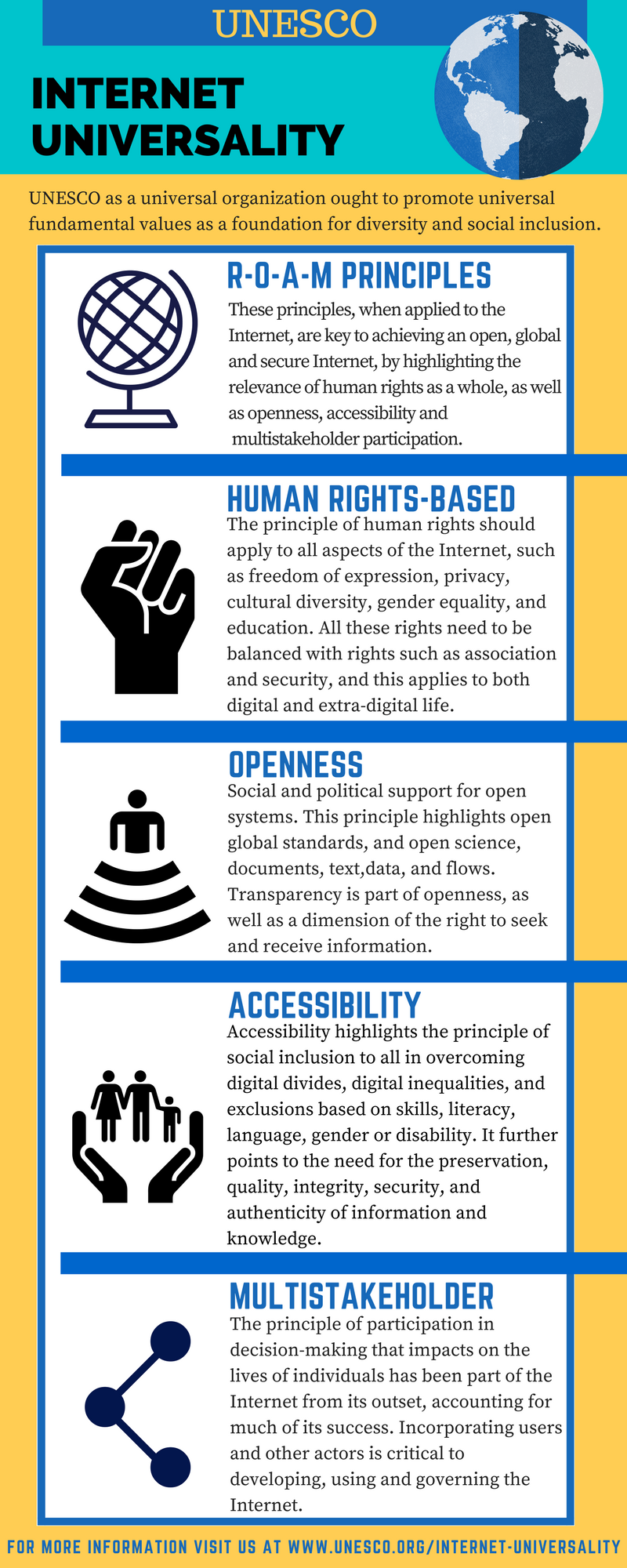
The principles of Internet Universality

== Wider context ==
The internet can connect individuals, localities, nations, or continents to information, expertise and communities distributed globally. It can also be used to create, disseminate, and consume information and knowledge resources. This potential for reconfiguring access to information and knowledge, as well as changing freedom of expression, privacy, and trends in ethics and behavior, has been a theme in academic research. Information and communication technologies, such as social media, developing mobile internet, and the Internet of Things (IoT), include developments like cloud computing, big data, and robotics.

By 2014, over three billion people had gained access to the internet worldwide. (Note: Internet World Stats estimates that there were 3,035,749,340 Internet users by 30 June 2014, constituting 42.3% of the global population of 7.2B people.) However, those with access often may not access all its content due to language barriers and skills deficits. The global diffusion of the internet is progressing, while public knowledge about the internet is changing with it, in ways ranging from mobile applications and payment systems to social media and Information and Communication Technologies (ICT). It has also become involved in economic development.

== Internet Universality Principles: R-O-A-M ==
The R-O-A-M principles constitute a theoretical framework for evaluating the state of each key fields of internet policy. The framework emphasizes a set of principles applied to the internet, focusing on human rights, openness, accessibility and multi-stakeholder participation.

=== Rights-based ===
The internet changes the perception of human rights. UNESCO and the United Nations broadly state that human rights should apply to all aspects of the internet, including freedom of expression, privacy, cultural diversity, gender equality, and education, balanced with rights that apply to both digital and non-digital life.

=== Openness ===
UNESCO and the United Nations' ideas, applied to the internet, discuss global standards, interoperability, open application interfaces, open science, documents, text, data, and flows. Social and political support for open systems, not only technical expertise, is part of this principle. Transparency is part of openness, as well as a dimension of seeking and receiving information, making rights and openness interdependent.

=== Accessibility ===
The internet raises discussions of digital divides, digital inequalities, and exclusions based on skills, literacy, language, gender or disability. Business models for internet activity may also be created to increase individuals' trust in the preservation, quality, integrity, security, accessibility, and authenticity of information on it.

=== Multi-stakeholders participation ===
Participation in decision-making has been part of the internet from its outset, incorporating users and their perspectives in developing, using, and governing it.

It is possible to define several categories of stakeholders in the internet, with subgroups as well: states, businesses and industries, non-governmental organizations (NGOs), civil society, international governmental organization, research actors, individuals, and others. Each of these categories has different stakes in the future of the internet, but there are also areas of great overlap and interdependence. For instance, some NGOs are likely to prioritize the promotion of human rights, while parliaments are primary actors in defining laws on that concept. Other stakeholders include search engine providers and Internet Service Providers (ISPs). Individuals also play a part in the concept of rights on the internet.

=== Cross-cutting factors ===
Aside from the four main factors (R-O-A-M), UNESCO has also identified five cross-cutting factors. Two of these are concerned with gender and age equality, one with sustainable development (i.e., the role of the internet in achieving the Sustainable Development Goals developed by the UN), another with internet trust and security, and the last with legal and ethical properties of the internet.

== Internet Universality Indicators ==
UNESCO has been developing internet Universality indicators - based on the ROAM principles as a tool for governments and other stakeholders to assess their national internet environments. The research process included consultations at global forums, a written questionnaire sent to key actors, and a series of publications on internet freedom-related issues such as encryption, hate speech online, privacy, digital safety, and journalism sources. The outcome of this research was publicized in June 2018, and the final indicators were to be submitted to the UNESCO Member States in the International Program for Development of Communication (IPDC) for endorsement.

The indicators are divided into three groups: quantitative indicators, qualitative indicators and institutional indicators (concerning constitutional and legal arrangements). This has raised questions about the credibility of the indicators and the difficulty of carrying out the research. Due to differences in data availability, assessing all indicators for all countries involved may be challenging. However, UNESCO believes that the indicators included in the framework should enable a comprehensive assessment of the internet environment. Other challenges include differing definitions of terms like 'broadband' and the fact that most data is held by private companies and is not publicly available.

== The Four Major Fields of Focus ==
=== Access to Information and Knowledge ===
Access to information is the ability to seek and receive open scientific, indigenous, and traditional knowledge online, and also produce content in all forms. This requires initiatives for freedom of information and the building of open and preserved knowledge resources, as well as a respect for cultural and linguistic diversity, educational opportunities for all, including new media literacy and skills, and social inclusion online, addressing inequalities based on income, skills, education, gender, age, race, ethnicity, or accessibility by those with disabilities.

=== Freedom of Expression ===
Freedom of expression entails the ability to safely express one's views over the internet, ranging from the rights of internet users to freedom of expression online, press freedom, and the safety of journalists, bloggers and human rights advocates, along with policies that increase the open exchange of views and respect for free online expression. Privacy broadly refers to internet practices and policies that allow individuals to have personal space and control access to their personal information. Privacy, therefore, allows individuals to freely express their ideas without fear of reprisals.

=== Privacy ===
Privacy protection is related to the promotion of openness and transparency and its greater use for social and economic development.

=== Ethics ===
Ethics considers whether the tendencies, rules, and procedures that govern online behavior, along with the design of the internet and related digital media, are based on principles anchored in human rights and protect the dignity and safety of individuals in cyberspace, advancing accessibility, openness, and inclusiveness on the internet. Issues such as discrimination baes on gender, age, or disabilities, along with the intentions of practices and policies that may lead to it, and their outcomes, fall under this field.

== Challenges to Internet Universality ==
As the World Wide Web and related digital media have evolved, they have come to serve many diverse purposes for many different actors, such as household entertainment, government surveillance. Technical innovations are altering traditional business models, such as in the provision of news, and the structure of organizations, where traditional hierarchical reporting relationships have been challenged by many-to-one and many-to-many networks of communication that span organizational boundaries.

=== Policy ===
As digital media has been a force behind the convergence of formerly more distinct technologies of the past, such as the telephone and mass media, policy and regulation have moved more slowly in comparison. A worldwide ecology of policies and regulations changes local and global outcomes of the internet on access to information and knowledge, freedom of expression, privacy, and ethics. Such policy choices are being considered by multiple actors at all levels, concerned that the policies and practices governing the internet could undermine principles and purposes they view as fundamental, whether those values are centered on freedom of expression, the privacy of personal information, or ethical conduct, and whether the implications are immediate or long-term.

=== Blocking, Filtering, and Content Regulation ===
Blocking, filtering, and content regulation are common areas of concern for NGO's and International Organizations, such as UNESCO. These measures impact how citizens impart information and opinions, as well as access to online content. In many cases, users might not realize that content has been filtered or blocked. There is some recognition that there is reason in certain contexts to block specific content, such as material that incites violence. This raises the question of how to draw the line in specific cases about what to block, for how long, in what proportion, and with what transparency and redress mechanism. (Note: This common example originated in 1919 with US Supreme Court Justice Oliver Wendell Holmes, Jr.'s opinion in the United States Supreme Court case Schenck v. United States.)

Another issue is holding intermediaries liable for specific digital content as if they were its publishers—for example, making social media platforms responsible for an alleged case of hate speech. International standards of human rights law mean that removal, blockage or filtering of internet content would be the exception to free flow of information and that such actions fulfill the conditions of due purpose, necessity, proportionality, and transparency, and are authorized under relevant law and policy. Multiple actors, including individual users, can identify instances of censorship and expose these cases to the court of public opinion. In such ways, the internet has the potential for enabling individual internet users to hold institutions and other users more accountable for their actions online, creating what has been called a 'Fifth Estate', analogous to the Fourth Estate of the press.

=== User Targeting and Profiling ===
Governments or commercial enterprises have the ability to focus on individual users, given that they will know much about their interests through their search or other online activities. Individual users of social media platforms can advertise to others interested in particular topics. This can appear more as an encroachment on privacy than the exercise of free speech in certain instances. A related issue is the 'filter bubble': the idea that different internet users will see different versions of the internet based on how algorithms use their previous search or social media preferences. User targeting can happen in government, private companies, and infrastructure.

=== Expression and Identification ===
Freedom of expression is influenced by related issues of privacy, anonymity, and encryption.

=== Anonymity ===
Anonymity is considered as a prerequisite for the expression of unpopular or critical speech. Anonymity is sometimes viewed as contributing to speech outside international standards of human rights law for protected speech, such as hate speech. Despite this perception, academic research has not established that removing anonymity and requiring the identification of speakers would prevent speech considered insensitive or hurtful, which is often fostered by a larger set of circumstances, such as a failure of users sitting at a computer to fully realize that they are communicating with a real person. Anonymity may also impact public debate online. In some countries, participants would refrain from discussing certain topics, such as gay rights or domestic abuse, for fear of identification and persecution.

=== Data Protection and Surveillance ===
Data protection plays a role in free expression. Meanwhile, increasing government surveillance of citizens, including through the collection and analysis of 'big data,' interferes with privacy and freedom of expression. A report of the former UN Special Rapporteur on Freedom of Opinion and Expression states that bulk access to all digital communications traffic eradicates the possibility of individualized proportionality analysis because it pre-empts prior authorization based on specific targeted suspicion. The role of mass surveillance potentials and the use of big data analytics could change the balance between the state and individuals. Whistleblowers, such as Edward Snowden, helped identify the mass surveillance of communications metadata in response to a security problem. Concerns were also expressed during the 'CONNECTing the dots' conference about surveillance tools, which were originally built to address severe crimes, but being used to collect personal information about dissidents, or sometimes from all citizens. Further concerns were expressed over transparency on how data is collected or used for security investigations. Manipulation of security practices, such as the introduction of 'back doors' into software, which were originally made to allow legitimate government access, can leave internet users vulnerable to illegitimate threats.

=== Jurisdictional Issues ===
There are a certain obstacles in maintaining and promoting freedom of expression via regulation and regulatory frameworks. Due to its globalized and borderless nature, the internet can be seen as inherently unregulated. For example, it is difficulty to establish state-based regulation, due to content being able to be hosted and accessed by those in multiple countries. UNESCO considers that governments role is not to restrict freedoms but to ensure that certain concepts—including communication-related rights—are protected.

== Sources ==
This article incorporates text from a free content work. Licensed under CC BY SA 3.0 IGO (license statement/permission). Text taken from Keystones to foster inclusive Knowledge Societies, 107, United Nations Educational, Scientific and Cultural Organization, UNESCO. http://www.unesco.org/new/en/communication-and-information/crosscutting-priorities/unesco-internet-study/.
