= Tunis Agenda for the Information Society =

Consensus statement

The Tunis Agenda for the Information Society was a consensus statement of the World Summit on the Information Society, adopted on November 18, 2005 in Tunis, Tunisia. It called for the creation of the Internet Governance Forum and a novel, lightweight, multistakeholder governance structure for the Internet.

== See also ==
- Tunis Commitment
