= .xyz =

Internet top-level domain

- Introduced: February 19, 2014; 12 years ago (root server); June 2, 2014 (general public)
- TLD type: Generic top-level domain (gTLD)
- Status: Active
- Registry: Generation.XYZ (registry); CentralNic (registry technical operator)
- Intended use: None
- Registration restrictions: None
- Documents: ICANN Registry Agreement
- DNSSEC: Yes
- Registry website: gen.xyz

.xyz is a top-level domain name introduced through ICANN's new generic top-level domain (gTLD) Program. Its name consists of the last three letters of the Latin-script alphabet. XYZ.com and CentralNic are the registries for the domain, which was created by entrepreneur Daniel Negari. It became available to the general public on June 2, 2014, thereafter becoming widely used by tech startups, creators, and Web3 projects.

== Adoption ==
.xyz was the largest of its group of newly-released TLDs. Negari paid US$185,000 for the domain.

In mid-2014, domain name registrar Network Solutions gave away potentially hundreds of thousands of .xyz domains by placing them into some customer accounts on an opt-out basis. This resulted in domain name registry VeriSign bringing a lawsuit alleging that Network Solutions paid for the domains using advertising credit. In part due to this promotion, the number of registered .xyz domains reached 428,806 by August 2014; however, only roughly 10,000 of the promotional domains out of the 351,457 given away were in active use by July 2015.

In November 2015, .xyz reached 1.5 million domain name registrations, possibly boosted in part by Google's decision to use abc.xyz for its corporate (Alphabet Inc.) website, one of the first major corporations to use the domain. Google reportedly paid Negari US$8 per month to maintain the domain.

In 2020, .xyz had the seventh-most registrations of all TLDs with 3,182,692 registered domains. In 2022, it rose to the fourth-most registrations (below .com, .net, and .org), with 4,563,254 registrations.

A 2022 analysis showed that 93% of all .xyz domain name registrations lasted for only the minimum registration time of one year, compared to 60% for more mainstream TLDs such as .com and .net.

By mid-2025, over 6 million domains were registered using the .xyz TLD.

== 1.111B Class ==
On June 1, 2017, .XYZ launched the 1.111B class .xyz domains, cheap domains priced at US$0.99 per year and renewed at the same price. The class of domains consists of six, seven, eight, and nine-digit numeric combinations between 000000.xyz and 999999999.xyz. Daniel Negari, CEO of .XYZ, stated that it was meant to bring competition, choice, and innovation to the market.

== Malicious domains ==
In 2023, the Anti-Phishing Working Group stated that the .xyz and .shop domain names were in the top 5 for malicious domain registrations, due to low prices and quick registration processes. It was estimated in 2022 that 6.62% of extant domains in the .xyz TLD were malicious. Due to these instances of malware, scams and phishing, multiple anti-malware vendors have blacklisted many or all .xyz domains.

Malicious domains in the .xyz TLD were found to have, on average, significantly shorter lifetimes than in other TLDs, with 97–99% of malicious .xyz domains having lifetimes shorter than one year (the minimum domain registration period), with a median deletion time of 13 days after being blacklisted.

== See also ==
- List of Internet top-level domains
- .xxx
