= Encyclopedia Dramatica =

Parody-themed wiki website

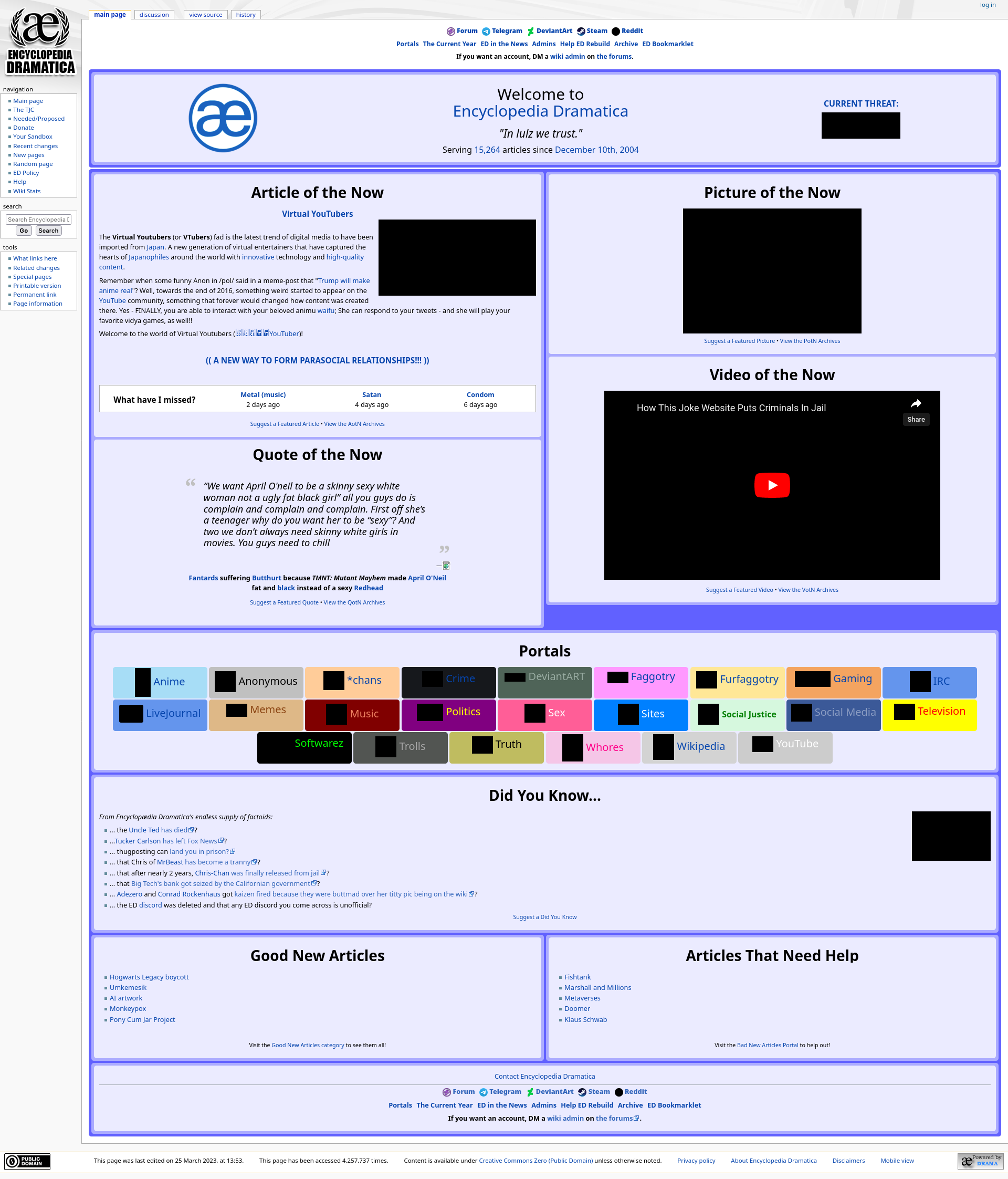
- Screenshot Encyclopedia Dramatica's front page on August 6, 2023, with copyrighted elements obscured.
- Website type: Wiki, forums and parody
- Available in: English
- Creator: Sherrod DeGrippo
- Revenue: Advertising and donations
- Commercial: No
- Registration: Optional (required to edit pages)
- Launched: December 10, 2004; 21 years ago
- Current status: Online

Encyclopedia Dramatica (ED or æ; stylized as Encyclopædia Dramatica) is an online community website, centered around a wiki. The website's articles use an encyclopedic style to parody topics and events relevant to contemporary internet culture. Encyclopedia Dramatica also serves as a repository of information and a means of discussion for the hacker group known as Anonymous. An article in The New York Times said that the wiki was "effectively" acting as a "troll archive". It celebrates its subversive "NSFW" "troll site culture" and documents internet memes, events such as mass organized pranks, trolling events called "raids", large-scale failures of internet security, and criticism by its users of other internet communities they accuse of censoring themselves in order to garner positive coverage from traditional and established media outlets. The site hosts numerous pornographic and gore images, along with misogynistic, racist, and homophobic content.

On April 14, 2011, the original URL of the site was redirected to a new website named "Oh Internet" that bore little resemblance to Encyclopedia Dramatica. Parts of the ED community harshly criticized the changes. On the night of the Encyclopedia Dramatica shutdown, regular ED visitors bombarded the 'Oh Internet' Facebook wall with hate messages. The Web Ecology Project published a downloadable archive of Encyclopedia Dramatica's content the next day. Besides this archive, fan-made torrents and several mirrors of the original site were subsequently generated. Based on these archives, the site has repeatedly gone offline and come back under new domain names. Between 2013 and 2024, the website was hosted under various top level domains: .rs, .ch, .es, .se, .wiki, .online, .top, .win and .gay. As of October 2025, none of these are active.

== History ==
=== DeGrippo Era (.com) ===
Encyclopedia Dramatica's historical logo (2005–2010)

Encyclopedia Dramatica was founded in 2004 by Sherrod DeGrippo, also known by the online pseudonym "Girlvinyl". DeGrippo joined LiveJournal in 2000 and became enthralled by the behavior of some of its members:

People were accessible and it was bidirectional. Voyeurs and exhibitionists were able to interact in a way that was normalized. That's why I started ED. It was mostly just personalities that were just so nuts and fascinating.

She became involved in the LJdrama community (which covered stories on LiveJournal gossip). When the community was banned from LiveJournal, they created their own website. In 2002, two LiveJournal users, Joshua Williams (also known online by the pseudonym mediacrat) and Andrewpants, became intimately involved with each other. After they broke off their relationship, LJdrama decided to document the resulting drama. Unflattering photographs of Williams were spread on the web, and Williams considered this to be harassment. He threatened legal action, traveled to Portland, Oregon, in order to speak to LiveJournal's abuse team, and reported the alleged harassment to a local TV news station. DeGrippo created Encyclopedia Dramatica in order to "house some information from livejournal and some drama about hackers Theo de Raadt and Darren Reed."

Encyclopedia Dramatica characterized itself as being "In the spirit of Ambrose Bierce's The Devil's Dictionary." The New York Times Magazine recognized the wiki as "an online compendium of troll humor and troll lore" that it labeled a "troll archive". C't, a European magazine for IT professionals, noted the site's role in introducing newcomers to the culture of /b/, a notorious Internet imageboard at 4chan. Encyclopedia Dramatica defines trolling in terms of doing things "for the lulz" (for laughs), a phrase that it qualifies as "a catchall explanation for any trolling you do."

The targets of this trolling come from "every pocket of the Web", to include not only the non-corporeal aspects of Internet phenomena, (e.g. online catchphrases, fan pages, forums and viral phenomena), but also real people (e.g. amateur celebrities, identifiable internet drama participants and even Encyclopedia Dramatica's own forum members). These are derided in a manner described variously as "coarse", "offensive", "obscene", "irreverent, obtuse, politically incorrect", "crude but hilarious", and "crude and abusive". The material is presented to appear comprehensive, with extensive use of shock-value prose, drawings, photographs and the like. The emotional responses are then added to the articles, often in similarly derogatory or inflammatory manner, with the purpose of provoking further emotional response. Adherents of the practice assert that visitors to the website "shouldn't take anything said on Dramatica seriously."

Articles at Encyclopedia Dramatica were particularly critical of MySpace as well as users on YouTube, LiveJournal, DeviantART, Tumblr, Something Awful and Wikipedia. In The New York Times Magazine, journalist Jonathan Dee described it as a "snarky Wikipedia anti-fansite". Shaun Davies of Australia's Nine Network called it "Wikipedia's bastard child, a compendium of internet trends and culture which lampoons every subject it touches." The site "is run like Wikipedia, but its style is the opposite; most of its information is biased and opinionated, not to mention racist, homophobic, and spiteful, but on the upside its snide attitude makes it spot-on about most Internet memes it covers." This coverage of Internet jargon and memes had been acknowledged in the New Statesman, on Language Log, in C't magazine, and in Wired magazine.

According to Sherrod DeGrippo,

As long as something wasn't submitted as illegal or an abuse complaint, I didn't even see it. Wikis are something that you either closely, closely monitor and manage, or you just let it go.

Predating sites like the former Cheezburger Network (now known as Know Your Meme) by several years, Encyclopedia Dramatica was the first encyclopedia dedicated to the memes and "mean-spirited trolling" of 4chan culture.

=== 2010 ownership by Evers ===
In March 2010, a "Joseph Evers" was recognized as the owner by ABC News, reporting on the site being blacklisted by the Australian Communications and Media Authority.

The Human Rights and Equal Opportunity Commission (HREOC) contacted Evers threatening him with charges under Australian law.

On December 8, 2010, Encyclopedia Dramatica deleted its article on Operation Payback. On the same day, Facebook deleted its Operation Payback page, and Twitter suspended Operation Payback's account. An anonymous source told Gawker that the Encyclopedia Dramatica article was deleted as the result of court orders.

In June 2020 it was reported by Canary Mission that Andrew "weev" Auernheimer is both the "weev" who "Zoombombed" a March 2020 chat for Jewish teens, and the "Joseph Evers" who owned and co-created the 2010 instance of ED and who has been wanted by the Australian Human Rights Commission since.

=== 2011 establishment of Oh Internet ===
Oh Internet main page

DeGrippo reportedly "came to hate" Encyclopedia Dramatica. She had hoped that ED would return to its roots and focus on LiveJournal drama. Furthermore, according to her, Encyclopedia Dramatica never turned a profit during the time she owned it, due to its content putting off advertisers.

On April 14, 2011, the URL encyclopediadramatica.com was redirected to "Oh Internet", an entirely different safe-for-work website that DeGrippo had created. The name "Oh Internet" is meant to convey "Oh, Internet, you are so crazy!" DeGrippo stated that "Shock for shock's sake is old at this point [...] ." Some regular users of Encyclopedia Dramatica were displeased by the change and attacked the website's official Facebook fan page with "hate messages and pornography".

In a question and answer session at the ROFLCon summit in October 2011, DeGrippo was asked why Encyclopedia Dramatica was closed and replaced with Oh Internet. She replied: "We were unable to stop the degradation of the content. It just kept getting longer and longer and dumber and dumber and less and less coherent over time." She also explained why she had not released the site as an archive, saying that she "didn't want to", and suggesting that this would have made her personally responsible for any DMCA and privacy violations that it contained. She also stated that hosting the site’s page on the Columbine High School massacre brought unwanted scrutiny of her from the Federal Bureau of Investigation.

=== Cleary (.ch) ===
From April 2011, Ryan Cleary hosted a fork of Encyclopedia Dramatica at encyclopediadramatica.ch. Members of this project gathered text and images from Google's web cache and other backups, and a script was created to upload cached information. On June 21, 2011, Scotland Yard arrested Ryan Cleary based on alleged connections to online attacks on Sony. The arrest temporarily disrupted operation of the wiki, but other members were able to resume Cleary's duties.

=== Moore (.se) ===
Garrett E. Moore later became the fork's owner. Moore reported difficulties in securing a host for the website.

On March 19, 2012, encyclopediadramatica.ch was shut down for a short time due to a "DNS block". On March 21, 2012, the site moved to a Swedish domain name, at encyclopediadramatica.se, instead of a domain in Switzerland as before. The site's Facebook account later addressed the block, stating that it was because "we didn't keep up our end of the nic.ch user agreement contract stating that we had to keep a mailing address and phone number in Switzerland."

In July 2011, Moore told an interviewer for The Daily Dot:

People take themselves too seriously, they can't laugh at anything. We make fun of everything. I make fun of skinny white computer nerds, but I am one.

When asked about "abusive content", Moore stated that he removes it when he sees it, then further explained:

I'm not going to leave a 14-year-old girl's address up on a page cause some dipshit got mad at her and made an article. But if you dress up like a fox and wear diapers and then take pictures of it? That's fair game, sir.

In a September 2011 interview with The Daily Dot, Moore defended his community's belief in free speech. In 2015, the .se domain went down and never came back up.

=== Gizmo games ===
In January 2013, a video game created by user "gizmo01942" came to the attention of the media. The game, Bullet to the Head of the NRA, was controversial because the player could take aim and shoot at members of the National Rifle Association of America. In February 2015, Muhammad Sex Simulator 2015, another video game by the same user, attracted further controversy because of the recent Charlie Hebdo shooting.

=== Aztec High School shooting ===
On December 7, 2017, 21-year-old William Atchison opened fire at a high school in Aztec, New Mexico, killing two before committing suicide. Atchison had been a site admin on Encyclopedia Dramatica (posting under the name AlGore) and had an obsession with mass shootings, with him creating the page on Dylann Roof.

== Reception ==
The website received mainstream media attention after Jason Fortuny used Encyclopedia Dramatica to post photographs, e-mails and phone numbers from 176 responses to a Craigslist advertisement he posted in 2006, in which he posed as a woman seeking sexual encounters with dominant men. The incident was addressed in a blog hosted at Wired News, where the blogger proposes that Encyclopedia Dramatica may be the "world's lamest wiki".

Julian Dibbell, in Wired, described Encyclopedia Dramatica as the site "where the vast parallel universe of Anonymous in-jokes, catchphrases, and obsessions is lovingly annotated, and you will discover an elaborate trolling culture: flamingly racist, homophobic and misogynistic content lurks throughout, all of it calculated to offend." The site is also known for its pervasive clickbait advertisements, in addition to its having almost none of the rules expected on other similar communities. Ninemsn described Encyclopedia Dramatica as:

Wikipedia's evil twin. It's a site where almost every article is biased, offensive, unsourced, and without the faintest trace of political correctness. A search through its archives will reveal animated images of people committing suicide, articles glorifying extreme racism and sexism, and a seemingly endless supply of twisted, shocking views on just about every major human tragedy in history.

In 2006, "a well-known band of trolls" emailed Encyclopedia Dramatica's creator, DeGrippo, demanding edits to the protected (i.e. locked) article describing them. After she refused to do so, the trolls ordered taxis, pizzas and escort services, and sent death threats and threats of rape to DeGrippo's apartment.

Encyclopedia Dramatica became a "favourite target for critics, who accuse Anonymous of propagating hate," for allowing alleged members of the group to sometimes use the website as a platform. Through this association, Encyclopedia Dramatica received incidental coverage when actions by members of Anonymous led to the arrest of an alleged pedophile, when they demonstrated against Scientology in London; when a member of the group broke into the e-mail account of former Republican vice-presidential nominee Sarah Palin, and when a member of Anonymous claimed credit for an attack on the virtual Second Life headquarters of former presidential candidate John Edwards. The convergence of Encyclopedia Dramatica with the anti-Scientology campaign of Project Chanology was noted by technology journalist Julian Dibbell.

The celebration and archival of the "raids" organized on /b/ on Encyclopedia Dramatica, which acted as a "troll hall of fame" when used this way, has been seen by some scholars, among them Liam Mitchell of Trent University, as acting as a way to assuage the guilt that trolls feel for harming their victims and being confronted with evidence of this harm. By celebrating on Encyclopedia Dramatica, and archiving that which would make an individual member guilty, trolls collectively engage in a type of mob mentality where the idea that "none of us is as cruel as all of us" minimizes the actions they take individually:

One cannot reason with a multitude, let alone appeal to its conscience. If any of its members are not susceptible to reason or conscience—the province of the ego ideal, and therefore of the divide that characterizes subjectivity—then the trolling will proceed.

On December 16, 2008, Encyclopedia Dramatica won the People's Choice Winners category for favorite wiki in Mashable's 2nd Annual Open Web Awards, with wikiHow as the runner-up and Wikipedia coming in third.

In December 2008, a message on Encyclopedia Dramatica asked for donations and claimed that the website was under attack and had lost its advertisers.

In January 2010, the Encyclopedia Dramatica article Aboriginal was removed from the search engine results of Google Australia, after a lawyer filed a complaint with the Australian Human Rights Commission saying its content was racist. A search on terms related to the article produced a message that one of the results has been removed after a legal request relating to Australia's Racial Discrimination Act (RDA). The publicity surrounding this served to raise the profile of the site. In March 2010, it was reported that the Australian Human Rights Commission had notified the site by e-mail that according to Australian law, the article in question could be in breach of Sections 18C and 18D of its RDA.

In 2020, a Canadian court heard that Alek Minassian, perpetrator of the Toronto van attack, was motivated in part by writings on Encyclopedia Dramatica relating to mass murderers, ranking them by "kill counts" and kill-to-injury ratios.

In academic research, Encyclopedia Dramatica has been studied for its role in shaping and archiving the language of antagonistic online subcultures. Linguistic and sociological analyses describe the site as a key repository for controversial vernacular, noting that its wiki structure helped consolidate the language community of these subcultures by archiving the roots of specific memes.Hagen, Sal. "On the Vernacular Language Games of an Antagonistic Online Subculture." ''Frontiers in Sociology'' (2022). PMC: 9355653.

The site is frequently cited in legal scholarship concerning internet harassment, cybermobs, and platform liability. Legal analysts contrast Encyclopedia Dramatica with platforms structurally designed for illicit transactions; while the site's culture celebrates trolling and harassment, its open-wiki format relies entirely on user-generated behavior, complicating the application of civil conspiracy and tort liability against the platform itself.Strickland, C. "Cybermobs, Civil Conspiracy, and Tort Liability." ''Fordham Urban Law Journal'' 44, no. 1 (2017).

Anthropological studies of the site often connect its underlying culture of "lulz" to the mythological trickster archetype. Scholars observe that Encyclopedia Dramatica serves as a cultural archive for internet tricksters, documenting pranks and extreme satire that deliberately ignore social taboos to provoke emotional reactions.Beyer, Jessica L. "The Chaotic Freedom Fighter: Anonymous as the Trickster of Cyberculture." ''Indiana University ScholarWorks'' (2014).

== Lawsuits ==
In 2016, a United Kingdom court determined an ED user must pay £10,000 in libel damages for making false statements about a former Labour councillor.

In 2017, a suit was launched against the website seeking US$750,000 for alleged copyright infringement. The "life-threatening" suit was by millionaire Jonathan Monsarrat. Monsarrat's suit was dismissed in December 2017, with the judge ruling that the three-year statute of limitations for copyright infringement had expired before the lawsuit was filed.

== See also ==
- 4chan – Anonymous imageboard website
- Kiwi Farms – Web forum
- Know Your Meme – Website and video series on memes
- List of Internet phenomena
- Lurkmore – Online encyclopedia focusing on Internet subcultures, folklore, and memes
- Something Awful – American comedy website, founded 1999
- Uncyclopedia – Satirical website
