= Team Internet =

British multinational internet services holding company

Team Internet Group PLC
- Formerly: CentralNic Group PLC
- Type: Public limited company
- Traded as: AIM: TIG
- Industry: Internet services
- Predecessor: NomiNation
- Founded: 2000
- Founder: Stephen Dyer
- Headquarters: London, United Kingdom, London, United Kingdom
- Area served: Multinational
- Services: Online marketing, online presence (domain name registration, registrar services, web hosting, brand management, domain parking, digital advertising, domain monetization, traffic commerce, product comparison)
- Divisions: Online Marketing, Online Presence

Team Internet Group PLC (formerly named CentralNic Group PLC) is a British multinational internet services holding company headquartered in London, United Kingdom. Its subsidiaries provide services categorized in two segments: Online Marketing and Online Presence. The Online Marketing segment offers services and products in digital advertising, domain monetization, traffic commerce and product comparison; the Online Presence segment provide domain name registry and registrar services, in addition to associated products and services, including web hosting, brand management, and domain parking.

Team Internet Group PLC is listed within the AIM market on the London Stock Exchange since 2013. It was featured in the FT1000 sixth (2022) and seventh (2023) annual list of Europe's fastest growing companies, being listed among the top-250 fastest-growing companies in both reports, published by the Financial Times in partnership with Statista, and among the top-50 fastest-growing Technology companies in Europe. Team Internet Group PLC is incorporated on both the FTSE AIM 100 and FTSE AIM UK 50 Indices.

== History ==
CentralNic was founded by Stephen Dyer in 2000 as a successor organisation to NomiNation, a company which he had founded in 1995.

In August 2013 CentralNic announced that it planned to float on the Alternative Investment Market of the London Stock Exchange. Shortly after this announcement, the Group began trading its shares on the LSE in September 2013.

In the following years CentralNic carried out several acquisitions: early in 2014 CentralNic acquired DomiNIC GmbH. That same year it announced the acquisition of retail domain name registrar Internet.BS, for US$7.5m, adding to its expanding Registrar Portfolio. In 2015 CentralNic acquired Instra Corp and quickly integrated this retail and corporate domain name registrar into its portfolio. A few years later, in 2018, CentralNic acquired the ccTLD for Slovakia (.sk) in a €26m deal.

CentralNic announced a transformative merger with KeyDrive Group on 16 July 2018, in a reverse takeover (according to AIM rules of the London Stock Exchange). After this, more acquisitions followed: on 6 September 2018 CentralNic acquired Romania and Brazil-focused registrar and domain hosting provider GlobeHosting Inc. for a consideration of €2.56 million.

2019 was a particular year with several acquisitions announced: on 20 May the Group announced its plans to acquire the leading Australian and New Zealand domain name and hosting reseller business TPP Wholesale for $24m AUD. On 1 July CentralNic acquired international domain name reseller platform Hexonet Group for up to €10 million. On 7 August CentralNic acquired international domain name retailer Ideegeo Group Ltd ("Ideegeo") for up to NZD$5.2 million (c.$3.4m USD). Then later in November CentralNic acquired Team Internet from Matomy Media for $48m.

In September 2020 it was announced that the Group would acquire the Zeropark and Voluum businesses of Polish company Codewise for $36m. The deal was completed in November 2020. Shortly after, in January 2021 CentralNic acquired French brand protection registrar Safebrands for $4.4m.

In October 2022, CentralNic acquired the California-headquartered domain name management business, Intellectual Property Management Co. Inc. for $7.6 million USD. And then in December 2022, it was announced the Group had acquired a portfolio of revenue generating niche websites from multiple sellers for $ 5.2 million USD cash.

On 4 September 2023, the rebranding of the CentralNic Group to Team Internet Group was announced during an event at the London Stock exchange to celebrate the company's 10-year IPO anniversary.

== Companies within the group ==
- CentralNic Ltd
- OnlyDomains
- Instra Corporation
- iwantmyname
- Internet Domain Service BS Corp
- Moniker
- domaindiscount24
- Hexonet
- CentralNic Reseller (formerly RRPproxy)
- PartnerGate
- 1api
- TPP Wholesale
- Key-Systems
- KeyDrive Group Archived 2018-09-02 at the Wayback Machine
- DomiNIC
- SK-NIC
- BrandShelter
- SafeBrands
- nic.SAARLAND
- toweb Brasil Archived 2020-09-30 at the Wayback Machine
- KS Registry Archived 2020-07-24 at the Wayback Machine
- Key-Systems Datacenter Archived 2022-04-28 at the Wayback Machine
- GlobeHosting
- Team Internet
- Codewise
- Wando Internet Solutions
- VGL Verlagsgesellschaft mbH
- AllesGesundheit
- NameAction

== Country code top-level domains ==
CentralNic Ltd, the domain name registry subsidiary of Team Internet Group PLC, registers second-level domains (SLDs) under these country code top-level domains (ccTLDs):

- .bh, Bahrain
- .fm, Federated States of Micronesia
- .fo, Faroe Islands
- .gd, Grenada
- .gl, Greenland
- .la, Laos; also borrowed for Los Angeles
- .pw, Palau
- .sk, Slovakia
- .vg, British Virgin Islands

== New top-level domains ==
Team Internet registers SLDs under these [new] generic top-level domain (gTLDs):

- .art
- .bar
- .basketball
- .best
- .college
- .ceo
- .design
- .fans
- .feedback
- .frl
- .fun
- .gent
- .host
- .icu
- .ink
- .love
- .observer
- .online
- .ooo
- .press
- .protection
- .realty
- .reit
- .rent
- .rest
- .security
- .site
- .space
- .storage
- .store
- .tech
- .theatre
- .tickets
- .website
- .wiki
- .xyz

== Second-level domains ==
Team Internet registers subdomains under these unofficial second-level domains (SLDs):

- .ae.org, for United Arab Emirates
- .ar.com, Argentina
- .br.com, Brazil
- .cn.com, China
- .com.de, Germany
- .de.com, Germany
- .eu.com, European Union
- .gb.com, Great Britain
- .gb.net, Great Britain
- .gr.com, Greece
- .hu.com, Hungary
- .jpn.com, Japan
- .jp.net, Japan
- .kr.com, Korea
- .no.com, Norway
- .qc.com, Quebec
- .ru.com, Russia
- .sa.com, Saudi Arabia
- .se.com, Sweden
- .se.net, Sweden
- .uk.com, United Kingdom
- .uk.net, United Kingdom
- .us.com: United States
- .us.org: United States
- .uy.com, Uruguay
- .za.com, South Africa

None of these domains is an official SLD. Therefore, this part of Team Internet's operation is a private sub-domain registry.

These subdomains have been relatively popular and sold across a wide range of domain registrars globally, including GoDaddy, Alibaba, Network Solutions, eNom, Webfusion, GMO Internet, Inc., Gandi, Key Systems, Directi, InternetX, and many others.
