= .music =

Community-based top-level domain name

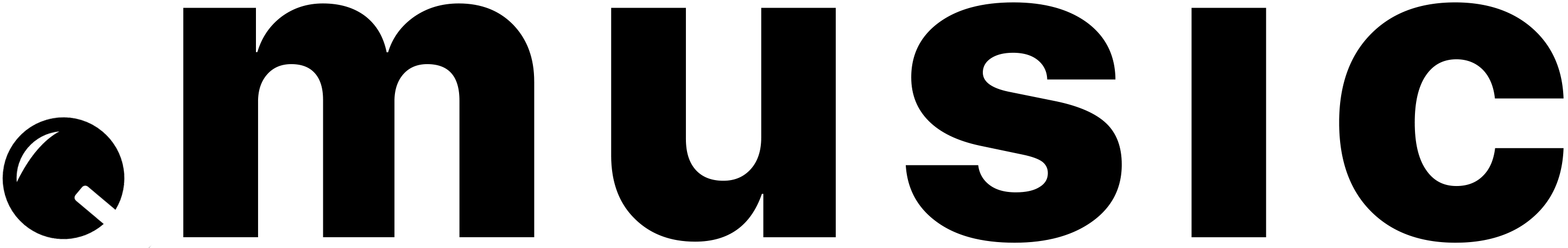
- TLD type: Community
- Status: ICANN Registry Agreement for .music was signed on May 4, 2021
- Intended use: music
- Registry website: register.music

.music is a community-based top-level domain name (TLD) operated for the benefit of the global music community. It was one of the most highly contested new gTLDs, with eight applicants in contention.

On April 17, 2019, the .MUSIC registry, the International Federation of the Phonographic Industry, Confédération Internationale des Sociétés d'Auteurs et Compositeurs, the International Federation of Musicians, the International Federation of Arts Councils and Culture Agencies, the Recording Industry Association of America, the National Music Publishers' Association, The Recording Academy, the Independent Music Companies Association, the Worldwide Independent Network, the American Association of Independent Music, the NSAI, the National Association of Music Merchants (NAMM), and the Independent Music Publishers International Forum (IMPF) announced that the global music community based application, that was supported by a global music coalition with members representing over 95% of global music consumed, was approved by the Internet Corporation for Assigned Names and Numbers (ICANN). The .MUSIC registry agreement was signed on May 4, 2021.

== Applicants ==
1. .MUSIC
2. Google (Charleston Road Registry Inc.)
3. Amazon
4. Donuts (Victor Cross)
5. Far Further
6. Top Level Domain Holdings Ltd. (TLDH) and LHL TLD Investment Partners
7. Radix
8. Famous Four MediaGRS Domains

=== .MUSIC ===
A community priority application was applied for by .MUSIC under the legal name of DotMusic. MUSIC was headed by Constantine Roussos, who launched the .MUSIC Initiative in 2005 to gather support from the global music community for a petition to ICANN for the rights of .MUSIC. Associated organizations included the International Federation of Arts Councils and Culture Agencies (IFACCA), the American Association of Independent Music (A2IM), and the National Association of Music Manufacturers (NAMM). The initiative's objectives included:

- Music education
- Fighting piracy
- Promoting the arts and global music
- Innovation in music and the internet space
- Promoting competition

The team planned to operate the .music TLD using a multi-stakeholder approach. A portion of the revenue generated from registrations was marked for donation to selected non-profit music organizations. These registrations would be restricted to .MUSIC-accredited Community Member Organizations (MCMOs). CentralNic was selected as the back-end registry services provider.

=== Far Further ===
Far Further was founded by music professionals with the objective of uniting the global music industry by providing it with a secure domain space to promote music, protect intellectual property rights and help advance music education. They submitted a community priority application using .music LLC, a subsidiary of Far Further LLC.

The company chose Neustar to provide back-end registry services. The domain was to be restricted to registrants qualified via association with a number of supporting organizations.

=== TLDH and LHL ===
On March 23, 2012, Top Level Domain Holdings Ltd. and LHL TLD Investment Partners signed a partnership agreement to apply for the .music TLD. Minds + Machines was to provide the back-end registry services.

=== Amazon ===
Amazon's application was issued a GAC Early Warning from representative of Australia and GAC Chair Heather Dryden. It stated that the applicant was "seeking exclusive access to a common generic string [..] that relates to a broad market sector, " which Dryden noted could have unintended consequences and a negative impact on competition.

=== Radix ===
Radix received a GAC Early Warning from the U.S. Government. The issue did not relate to their technical capabilities or the content of their applications, but rather the inclusion of an email address associated with the U.S. Federal Bureau of Investigation in a recommendation filed with Radix's application.

== Objections ==
A Legal Rights Objection, as defined by the ICANN approved mediator WIPO, is a third party "formal objection to an application on several grounds [..] When such an objection is filed, an independent panel (comprised of one or three experts) will determine whether the applicant's potential use of the applied-for gTLD would be likely to infringe [..] the objector's existing trademark, or IGO name or acronym."

=== Official objection ===
An official objection was filed by DotMusic Limited against .music applicants since DotMusic Limited had registered trademarks for ".music" and "dotmusic" in nearly thirty countries.

=== Community objections ===
The American Association of Independent Music (AAIM) and DotMusic filed community objections against Google, dot Music Limited, Dotmusic Inc., Top Level Domain Holdings Ltd., and Donuts on the basis that they applied as open registries without enhanced safeguards or sufficient eligibility restrictions to protect music-related intellectual property and prevent music piracy. The AAIM also filed a community objection against Amazon because of its application's exclusive-access registry policies and discriminatory registration eligibility criteria that restricted registrations solely to Amazon and its affiliates. For the same reason, the International Federation of Arts Councils and Culture Agencies and DotMusic filed a community objection against Far Further.

The objections against Amazon and Far Further were based on the ICANN Registry Agreement which required that new gTLD registries be subject to the requirements of Specification 11, which mandates that a TLD Registry must provide non-discriminatory access to registry services to all ICANN accredited registrars that enter into and are in compliance with the registry-registrar agreement for the TLD. In February 2014 ICANN passed resolutions for the new gTLD program which mandated specific enhanced safeguards and prohibited applicants from operating a new gTLD as an exclusive-access registry for a TLD based on a generic term.
