= .college =

Internet top-level domain intended for colleges

.College
- Introduced: 10 April 2014 (root zone); 2015 (launch)
- TLD type: Generic top-level domain
- Status: Active
- Registry: XYZ.COM LLC
- DNSSEC: yes
- Registry website: go.college

.college is a generic-top-level domain (gTLD) used in the domain name system of the Internet. It was delegated to the Root Zone of the DNS on 10 April 2014, completing the successful application for the string. The .college back-end registry operations are provided by CentralNic. Unlike .edu, .college is open for registration to the general public.

== Background ==
.college is owned and operated by XYZ.COM LLC, located in Las Vegas, Nevada, and Santa Monica, California.

=== Intended users ===
The main demographic for .college domains are entities close to, affiliated with, or which otherwise do business with/in higher education institutions but which are not entitled to a .edu domain or subdomain.

- Educational
  - Universities and/or university departments (outside the United States)
  - College athletics departments
  - Non-accredited institutions
  - College prep
  - Online education
- Corporate
  - Recruitment
  - Training & development
  - College town businesses
- Individuals
  - College faculty and staff
  - Students and alumni
  - On-campus organizations
  - Message boards
  - Social media & networking
  - Entertainment

== Launch periods ==
The .college trademark-exclusive sunrise phase began on March 17, 2015, and ran until April 17, 2015. Its landrush period, which was exclusively for educational institutions, opened on April 20, 2015, and ran until September 22, 2015. XYZ announced that it would waive the application fee and first year's registration fee for companies registered in the Trademark Clearinghouse, as well as Educational Institutions during the landrush period. It was launched into global general availability on September 29, 2015.
