= .info =

Internet top-level domain

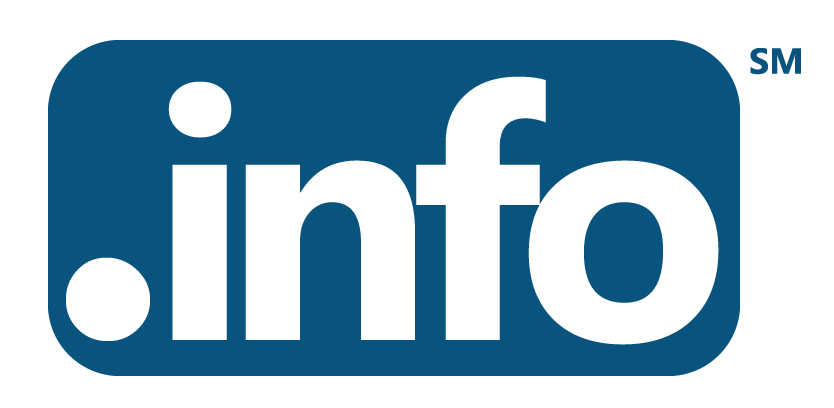
- Introduced: June 26, 2001; 25 years ago
- TLD type: Generic top-level domain
- Status: Active
- Registry: Identity Digital
- Sponsor: None
- Intended use: Informational websites
- Actual use: Used for general purposes; used sometimes when desired name is not available in .com and .net
- Registration restrictions: None
- Structure: Registrations at second level permitted
- Documents: ICANN registry agreement
- Dispute policies: UDRP
- Registry website: identity.digital

.info is a generic top-level domain (gTLD) in the Domain Name System (DNS) of the Internet. The name is derived from information, although registration requirements do not prescribe any particular purpose.

The TLD info followed ICANN's highly publicized announcement, in late 2000, of a phased release of seven new generic top-level domains. The event was the first addition of major gTLDs since the Domain Name System was developed in the 1980s. The seven new gTLDs, selected from over 180 proposals, were meant in part to take the pressure off the com domain.

== History ==
Domain info has been operated by Afilias since its creation. In 2003, it was the first gTLD domain to support IETF standards-based internationalized domain names. In 2001, Afilias CTO (Ram Mohan) discovered problems with the Universal Acceptance of the domain due to it being the first tld whose length was greater than two or three characters.

The launching of info involved a "Sunrise Period" for trademark owners, followed by a "landrush" open to all, the first time such a process had ever been conducted for a new gTLD. This process received criticism for giving trademarks precedence over words that are generic in other contexts; for instance, the Caterpillar construction equipment company was able to register cat.info before feline enthusiasts were.

Although a large number of fraudulent registrations were initially made by registrants who did not actually own a valid trademark, a challenge procedure later weeded out most of these.

Prior to launch, the names of countries were reserved from registration at the request of ICANN, to the consternation of those who had paid pre-registration fees to attempt to register these names in the landrush. ICANN's Governmental Advisory Committee, composed of country representatives from around the world applauded the move, the first by any major domain to protect the national interests of sovereign nations.

In November 2020, it was announced that Afilias was acquired by Donuts, the domain name registry operator. In 2022, Afilias and Donuts were merged and brought under a single company, Identity Digital.

== Usage ==
Domain info has been the most successful of the seven new domain names, with over 5.2 million domain names in the registry as of April 2008. After the September 11, 2001 attacks in the United States, the Metropolitan Transportation Authority of New York switched to the easier to remember mta.info website to lead users to latest information on schedules and route changes on the area's transportation services. ICANN and Afilias have also sealed an agreement for country names to be reserved by ICANN under resolution 01.92.

Info is an unrestricted domain, meaning that anyone can obtain a second-level domain for any purpose, similar to the domains com, net and org. This is in contrast to TLDs such as edu, or coop. Info is the only top-level domain that was explicitly created and chartered for unrestricted use, although various other TLDs resulted in this situation de facto. Info stands for information in about 37 languages, and is a neutral name.

Afilias, the registry operator of both the info and aero top-level domains, has been aggressive in its marketing of the domain, with significant registrar incentives and outreach events.

When The Onion acquired the intellectual property assets of Infowars, they did not acquire the original now inactive infowars.com domain. Instead, theonion.info serves as the web address for the relaunched InfoWars.
