= .site =

Internet top-level domain

- Logo used since 2021
- Introduced: March 12, 2015
- TLD type: Generic top-level domain
- Status: Active
- Registry: Radix
- Registered domains: 1,290,948 (1 January 2023)
- Registration restrictions: None
- Documents: Registry Information
- DNSSEC: Yes
- Registry website: get.site

.site is a generic top-level domain used in the Domain Name System of the internet. The domain was officially delegated to DotSite Inc (part of Radix) on 12 March 2015. In 2000, years prior to its current ownership, the company Afilias LLC attempted to apply for ownership of the domain, along with .info and .web.

== Usage ==
The .site domain reached the milestone of one million domain registrations in February 2019. Radix claims that approximately 70% of these registered domains were by small and medium businesses in fields such as ecommerce and information technology.

The .site domain has had minor issues with being abused for spam and fraudulent purposes.

== Name collision issues ==
In October 2013 ICANN released their final assessment and mitigation plan for the name collision issue that was facing the New gTLD program. On 18 November 2013, ICANN announced the applied-for strings that were eligible for an alternative path towards delegation that would allow applicants to proceed without waiting for further mitigation research and plans to be published. 25 strings, including .site, were not eligible for the alternative path, and will have to wait for more plans to be published before continuing towards delegation.

Logos

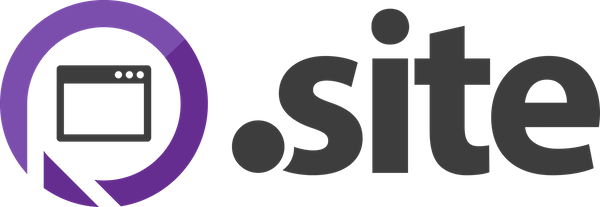
until 2018/2019

until 2021
