= Unsponsored top-level domain =

Category of IANA top-level domain

An unsponsored top-level domain (uTLD) is one of the categories of top-level domains (TLDs) maintained by the Internet Assigned Numbers Authority (IANA) for use in the Domain Name System of the Internet. IANA currently distinguishes 3 groups of top-level domains: country-code top-level domains (ccTLD), generic top-level domains (gTLD) and infrastructure top-level domain.

Unsponsored TLD is a specialized top-level domain that has no sponsor, in opposition of sTLD (sponsored), that has a sponsor representing a specific community served by the domain. Generally speaking, uTLD is a TLD without "owner", where ICANN has an important governance role.

It is a reduced set of TLDs: old ones (.com, .org and .net) and new ones (.biz, .info and .name).
