= .cab =

.cab may refer to:

- Cabinet (file format)
- Top-level domain for cab and taxi companies, see Generic top-level domain#New top-level domains
