= .art =

.art may refer to:

- The ART image file format, extension .art
- .art (top-level domain)
