= .aero =

Internet top-level domain

aero
- Introduced: December 22, 2001; 24 years ago
- TLD type: Sponsored top-level domain
- Status: Active
- Registry: SITA INC B.V.
- Sponsor: SITA SC; a Dot Aero Council was formed to take input from community; various industry associations have partner status
- Intended use: Airlines, airports, and other parts of the air-travel industry
- Actual use: Players in this industry seem to be using it, further usage just like .com, .info and other TLDs
- Registration restrictions: Credentials of applicants are checked before registration is permitted, but then any domain can be registered
- Structure: Some categories of users can register at the second level and others at the third level within appropriate second level names; some industry codes such as those of airports and airlines were automatically linked to appropriate sites even if unregistered
- Documents: ICANN registry agreement
- Dispute policies: UDRP, Charter Eligibility Dispute Resolution Procedure (CEDRP)
- Registry website: information.aero

.aero (derived from aeronautics) is a sponsored top-level domain (sTLD) used in the Domain Name System of the Internet. It is the first sponsored top-level domain based on a single industrial theme. The .aero domain is reserved for companies, organizations, associations, government agencies, and individuals in aerospace-related fields. It was created in 2002 and is operated by SITA. SITA created and operates the Dot Aero Council.

Two-letter codes under .aero are reserved for airlines according to the IATA Airline Designators. While three-letter codes were initially reserved for airports (IATA airport code), they were released for registration by the larger aviation and aerospace community on December 1, 2008.

The aero top-level domain was initially approved in 2001 for a 5-year term expiring December 17, 2006 as part of a proof-of-concept of new top-level domains. The agreement was extended in October 2006 for a six-month term until June 17, 2007, and continued to be renewed on a June–December six-month cycle through June 17, 2009. In 2009, SITA and ICANN completed a new 10-year sponsorship agreement for the operation of .aero.
