= .shop =

Internet top-level domain

- Introduced: 5 May 2016 (root zone); September 2016 (official availability)
- TLD type: generic top-level domain
- Status: Live
- Registry: GMO Registry, Inc.
- Sponsor: None
- Intended use: e-commerce
- Registered domains: 1,553,180 (1 January 2023)
- Registration restrictions: None
- Documents: Registry Agreement; Anti-abuse policy, other policies
- Registry website: http://get.shop

.shop is a generic top-level domain (gTLD) launched in September 2016. Nine companies including Google, Amazon and Famous Four Media filed applications for .shop in the 2012 ICANN new gTLD application round. GMO Registry became the registry operator after prevailing in an ICANN public auction in January 2016.

== History ==
The idea of a .shop generic top-level domain was around since at least 1999, when an attempt to register it with IAHC was made. Its proposed usage is similar to current endeavors: to provide a dedicated space for ecommerce on the Internet. In 2000, Commercial Connect, LLC requested to operate a .shop registry from ICANN.

Commercial Connect's application from 2000 was well-received, but other domains were prioritized. Japan's GMO Registry also expressed interest in the top level domain name space in late 2009, though Commercial Connect was the most vested candidate that had taken prior steps towards attaining delegation. In 2011, Commercial Connect was reported to have the support of ecommerce companies, with its completed application awaiting final approval as of June 2010. To further this support, Richard E. Last of the National Retail Federation and shop.org joined the board in late 2011.

When the next application process was opened in early 2012, Commercial Connect founder Jeffrey Smith described his .shop as a "hybrid between general public and specific use" designed to make a "more secure, stable, and intuitive" Internet. He sees the domain as a way to easily indicate sites that use online sales, with the application supported by a community defined by entities that use credit card transactions to sell products.

In May 2012, nine applicants including Google, Amazon and Famous Four Media applied to ICANN to operate the .shop registry. Commercial Connect was the only applicant who also applied for the .shop string in ICANN's year 2000 new-TLD round. Applications were also received for the extensions .shopping, .store, .buy, and names with similar meanings in non-Latin languages, and ICANN indicated that they would not create extensions that will confuse users. This so-called "string similarity" is an unresolved issue in the new gTLD process, and is to complement dispute resolution.

In January 2016, GMO Registry of Japan prevailed with a winning bid of US$41.5 million.
