= Landrush period =

Period of domain name registration open to a closed group

A landrush period is the time during which domain names are available for registration, usually to a closed group (usually through a premium price), to entities that do not own a trademark in the name they wish to register, for example generic terms like loan or car, and thus would not qualify for registration during the sunrise period. Orders may or may not be treated on a first-come-first-served basis. This period follows the sunrise period just after the launch of a new top-level domain or second-level domain during which, for example, owners of trademarks may register a domain name containing the owned mark, but a landrush period precedes a period of general availability, when any qualifying entity can register any name on a first come first-served basis.

== Launch phase ==
As launches occur, gTLDs will follow a cycle of different launch phases. All launch phases start with the Sunrise Period, there is flexibility with the other stages.

=== Sunrise period ===
The sunrise period is often a 30-day (or longer) phase during which trademark owners can purchase domain names before they are offered to the general public. This period of time allows for companies to keep the domain name associated with their brand before someone can publicly purchase the domain. Often domains such as info, mobi, and eu are picked up by companies during the sunrise period that precedes the larger landrush period. In order to participate in the sunrise period, one has to be a registered trademark holder with the Trademark Clearing House. The allowance of time for each registered domain name in the sunrise period is two years. After that, the trademark holder needs to reclaim their domain.

=== Landrush period ===
The Internet Corporation for Assigned Names and Numbers (ICANN) defines the landrush period as the time between the sunrise period and general availability during which applications for a domain name may be received from any interested eligible party.

Registries often have the option of including a landrush period, but this process is not mandatory. In the landrush period registration is open to everyone, but the registration is sold at a higher price than the regular price. Also some domains during a landrush period could be auctioned or on a "first come, first served" basis.

The only domains not offered to everyone during the landrush period are Premium Domains. Each registry reserves the right to reserve high value or "Premium" domains and to sell or auction those domains at elevated prices.

On average, a landrush period will last about 30 days and, in this period, applications for domain names may be received from any interested and eligible parties before registration is open for general availability.

In 2012 a digital land rush was expected because of a possible creation of new domain names and web addresses. The Internet Corporation for Assigned Names and Numbers (ICANN), a non-profit, is currently responsible for regulation of domain names, and ICANN predicted a landrush period for the new domain names. ICANN surveyed the public for new possible names, and the organization had a goal of trying to expand new top-level domain names. As new domain names are created, ICANN hopes for many overseers to sell their name to registrars. According to ICANN, the front-runner for a new domain name is ".shop" and the goal is to increase supply and demand for domain names. A landrush period will occur over the creation of new domain names because as the new domain names are created, overseers will sell their domain names, which will cause businesses and individuals to rush to buy new names. This increase in demand causes a landrush period and leads to increase consumption of domain names. In addition to an increase of demand in a landrush period, ICANN hopes to have a greater landrush period than ".jobs", which was a failure.

==== ICANN's Procedure for Landrush ====
According to The Internet Corporation for Assigned Names and Numbers (ICANN) in order to participate in a Landrush period applicants must submit an application for a domain name that was not previously allocated, not eligible for allocation, and is not subject of an application that is being currently processed by the auction provider. Also multiple applications for the same domain name will be settled with an auction. In addition, a claims period will be in effect during the entire duration of the Landrush period and the applicant must accept the information contained within a Claim Notice.

=== General Availability Period ===
The General Availability phase follows all Sunrise and Landrush periods. This is an open period based on the "first come, first served" policy to the public. Typically, 90 calendar days after General Availability opens for each new gLTD, registries must provide Trademark Claims.

ICANN defines General Availability is the point in time following which requests to register a domain name may be received from any eligible part on the same "first come, first served" basis. Another name for General Availability is also General Registration.

== Major Landrush Periods ==
=== First Major Landrush ===
Though generic top-level domains (gTLDs) were first established in 1984, the first major domain landrush was mostly centered around the dot-com bubble, which took place from 1997 until 2003. With the release of the official generic top-level domains, dot-com companies began to arise. This bubble involved investors pouring money into internet startups during the 1990s with hopes that those companies would one day become profitable. These companies were solely based on the World Wide Web, but usually had no strategic business model to support any revenue stream. The result was the bursting of the dot-com bubble, which ultimately ended the first major landrush period.

A large part of the first major landrush was cybersquatting, a practice in which individuals strategically purchase high-value domain names for resale at a higher price. However, this practice was made illegal with the passage of the Anticybersquatting Consumer Protection Act in 1999. There are companies, such as DomainMarket.com, based around similar practices yet are still considered legal ventures.

=== Second Major Landrush ===
February 4, 2014, marked the beginning of the second major domain landrush. This landrush commenced the production of new web addresses, which has not occurred since 2000, when ICANN last accepted applications for top-level domains. The process of applying for new domain names runs through ICANN, the non-profit that manages several Internet-related tasks. ICANN's process can be an expensive one, demanding an initial fee of $185,000. Additionally, the application process is a lengthy one, in which ICANN believes could take up to a year. Furthermore, the domain names are not simply given to anyone. ICANN reviews critical details regarding applicants’ financial stability, technical abilities and their intentions with the domain.

Andy Vuong of the Denver Post wrote that some of these new domains will, "target specific industries, such as .attorney and .ski, or social causes, such as .hiv, which will be dedicated to sites that contribute to the fight against HIV and AIDS".

The essential reason to create new gTLDs is due to the fact that there are not enough domain names available for businesses or individuals to create sensible and logical URLs. A vast amount of .com's are in use already, and individuals and businesses are having difficulties in creating a fitting and simple domain. ICANN's Cyrus Namazi told Quartz that, “We’ve gone from an average of four or five letters in a second-level domain to something in excess of 14 to find what you’re looking for”.

== Global Landrush Periods ==
=== The .eu Landrush Period ===
One of the major landrush periods that occurred was the .eu TLD (top level domain). The “.eu [domain] is the country code top-level domain (ccTLD) for the European Union” and it was approved in March 2005. It is currently one of the largest European ccTLD. The sunrise period for this domain was divided into two separate parts—the first opened on December 7, 2005, while the second began on February 7, 2006. The first phase was meant for “registrants with prior rights based on trademarks and geographic names” leaving the second phase open to “company, trade, and personal names”.

After the sunrise period comes the landrush, which, for .eu, occurred on April 7, 2006, when registration for the domain became possible for “non-trademark holders”. In order to request a domain, people had registrars place their requests into a long queue. Many registrars were backed up with too many requests, so registering for a domain essentially became a game. People would figure out which registrars had already completed many requests, which left these registrars with few requests, and “allow[ed] people to ‘beat the queue.’” The way that EURid (European Registry for Internet Domains) designed the land rush for the .eu domain allowed for over 700,000 domains to be registered within the first 4 hours. Four months later, in August 2006, there were 2 million registered .eu domains.

The process that EURid created for this domain was criticized for using “phantom” registrars. The difference between something known as a “phantom” registrar and a regular, official registrar, is that an official registrar has only one chance to register a specific domain, while a “phantom” registrar crowds out the .eu domain and has multiple opportunities to register the same domain. This suspicion arose due to 400 registered LLC companies that had similar addresses and contact information. Bringing this realization to the public's attention was the founder of GoDaddy who felt that these 400 companies were classified as "phantom registrars created to hijack the .eu land rush."
