= .biz =

Generic top-level Internet domain

- Introduced: June 26, 2001; 25 years ago
- TLD type: Generic top-level domain
- Status: Active
- Registry: Registry Services LLC (owned by GoDaddy)
- Sponsor: None
- Intended use: Businesses
- Actual use: Various uses, including as an alternative to .com
- Registered domains: 1,472,919 (1 January 2022)
- Registration restrictions: No prior restriction on registration, but registrations can be challenged if registrant is not a bona-fide commercial entity
- Structure: Registrations at second level permitted
- Documents: ICANN registry agreement
- Dispute policies: UDRP
- DNSSEC: yes
- Registry website: domains.registry.godaddy/biz

.biz is a generic top-level domain (gTLD) in the Domain Name System of the Internet. It is intended for registration of domains to be used by businesses. The name is a phonetic spelling of the first syllable of business.

== History ==
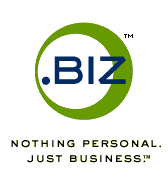
Logo at launch

Last logo while administered by Neustar

The biz TLD was created to relieve some of the demand for domain names in the com top-level domain, and to provide an alternative for businesses whose preferred domain name in com had already been registered by another party. There are no specific legal or geographic qualifications to register a biz domain name, except that it must be for "bona fide business or commercial use." It was created in 2001 along with several other domains as the first batch of new gTLDs approved by ICANN in the expansion of the Domain Name System following the increased interest in internet commerce in the late 1990s. The TLD, originally administered by Neustar until 2020, is currently administered by GoDaddy and registrations are processed via accredited registrars.

In contrast to other newly installed top-level domains, the biz registry did not implement a sunrise period to grant trademark owners first chance at registration, but instead used a procedure it called the "IP Claims Service" whereby trademark owners could file intellectual property claims in advance and then challenge any eventual registrant through a policy named Startup Trademark Opposition Policy (STOP). This process was created by Jeffrey J. Neuman as proof-of-concept protection service and an alternative to the Sunrise policy. A number of domains were successfully obtained by trademark owners from other registrants through this policy; some of the more controversial cases included those of paint.biz and Canadian.biz, the latter being reversed by a court decision.

== Use ==
On June 23, 2008 at the ICANN 32nd International Public Meeting in Paris, the biz registry announced that it had officially surpassed two million registrations worldwide.

In Turkish, biz means 'we' and is used in some sites such as turkleriz.biz (We are the Turks) and fenerliyiz.biz (We are fans of Fenerbahçe).

The unrecognised Republic of Abkhazia, which doesn't have its own domain zone, uses .biz as абызшәа (abezshwa) means 'language' in Abkhaz.

== Alternative DNS roots ==
Before ICANN approved of the biz top-level domain in the official DNS root, similar domains of the same name were already in use by alternative DNS roots. This created the possibility of a biz domain pointing to different IP addresses depending on the specific DNS configuration of a client computer. For this reason, the domain's registry, GoDaddy, requires that a DNS server be officially registered with them on their list of approved DNS servers before a domain registrar may register it in the WHOIS database.
