= .tech =

Internet top-level domain

- Logo used since 2023
- Introduced: 21 March 2015
- TLD type: Generic top-level domain
- Status: Live
- Registry: Radix Registry
- Sponsor: None
- Intended use: Technology and startups
- Registered domains: 467,017 (15 March 2023)
- Registration restrictions: None
- Registry website: https://get.tech

.Tech is a generic top-level domain (gTLD) of the Domain Name System (DNS) used in the Internet. The name is truncated from technology.

== History ==
Logo used until 2023

In 2012, ICANN announced it would be expanding the range of domain extensions to further organize the internet with .tech being requested by multiple parties. Six companies including Google, Uniregistry, Donuts (Lone Moon, LLC), STRAAT Investments, and Top Level Domain Holdings Ltd, filed applications for this TLD in one of the first ICANN New gTLD application public auctions.

The .tech TLD was launched in March 2015. It is currently owned and operated by Radix, founded by Bhavin Turakhia.

In 2017, a .tech domain name won an SEO ranking contest. As of August 2019, startup companies using the .tech domain had raised over $2 billion in venture capital. The gTLD partners with GitHub offering one year of free registration as part of its Student Developer Pack.

== Usage ==
The .tech gTLD is used by an array of websites in the technology sector with companies like Cisco and Intel launching sites that use the extension. Other notable uses of the TLD include the Consumer Electronics Show (CES) and Viacom along with startups such as Aurora Innovation, Flit, and Innoviz.
