= .top =

Internet top-level domain

- Introduced: November 18, 2014 (General Availability)
- TLD type: Generic top-level domain (gTLD)
- Status: Active
- Registry: .top registry
- Sponsor: Jiangsu Bangning Science & Technology Co., Ltd.
- Registered domains: 2,066,084 (24 January 2023)
- Registry website: nic.top/en

.top is a generic top-level domain, officially delegated in ICANN's new gTLD program on August 4, 2014.

The domain name extension .top is managed and operated by the .top registry (registry backend ZDNS) which belongs to Jiangsu Bangning Science & Technology Co., Ltd. (江苏邦宁科技有限公司) in Nanjing, China, and can be registered by anyone since November 18, 2014 without special requirements. The original marketed intent of the .top TLD is for businesses to convey that they are the "top" or the best of their industry.

A second level domain under the top-level domain (TLD) .top can consist of digits, letters, hyphens and specific special characters while it can have a length of one up to (a maximum of) 63 characters. Like most other TLDs, it can be registered for a period of at least one year up to (a maximum of) 10 years in advance. The private registration (WHOIS privacy) of .top domains is supported, as is the ability to register internationalized domain names (IDNs), which include the character sets Arabic, Chinese (simplified and traditional), French, German, Japanese, Russian, and Spanish.

On 16 July 2024 ICANN issued a Notice of Breach to the registry for failing to respond to DNS abuse reports and failing to pay fees. On 2 June 2025, ICANN announced that the registry had cured its Notice of Breach.

== Development ==
- June 20, 2011, ICANN officially announced that the application for new gTLDs was to open in 2012.
- April 11, 2012, the application was submitted online. On June 9, 2012, it appeared on the ICANN public list.
- March 20, 2013, it passed initial evaluation.
- March 20, 2014, the registry signed a contract with ICANN.
- August 5, 2014, the domain entered the root zone of ICANN new gTLD.
- October 15, 2014, it entered its sunrise period.
- November 18, 2014, .top domains could be registered openly. Registration volume exceeded 10,000 on the first day.
- April 24, 2015, .top was put on record with Chinese national government department MIIT (Ministry of Industry and Information Technology).
- January 2016, .top released its IDN domains, supporting Arabic, Chinese (traditional + simplified), French, German, Japanese, Russian and Spanish. The availability can be checked by .top whois.
