= .org =

Internet top-level domain

org
- Introduced: January 1, 1985; 41 years ago
- TLD type: Generic top-level domain
- Status: Active
- Registry: Public Interest Registry (technical service by Identity Digital)
- Sponsor: Not technically sponsored, but PIR is connected with the Internet Society
- Intended use: Miscellaneous organizations not fitting in other categories (generally noncommercial)
- Actual use: Nonprofits; personal sites; open-source projects; some government websites; mostly used by non-commercial entities
- Registration restrictions: None
- Structure: Registrations at second level permitted
- Documents: RFC 920; RFC 1591; ICANN registry agreement
- Dispute policies: UDRP
- DNSSEC: Yes
- Registry website: pir.org

The domain name org is a generic top-level domain (gTLD) of the Domain Name System (DNS) used for Internet services. The name is truncated from organization. It was one of the original domains established in 1985, and has been operated by the Public Interest Registry since 2003. The domain was originally "intended as the miscellaneous TLD for organizations that didn't fit anywhere else". It is commonly used by non-profit organizations, open-source projects, and communities, but is an open domain that can be used by anyone. The number of registered domains in .org increased from fewer than one million in the 1990s to ten million in 2012, and has held steady between ten and eleven million since then.

== History ==
A 2020 protest led by the Electronic Frontier Foundation opposed to the proposed sale of org to a private firm

The domain org was established in January 1985, as one of the original top-level domains. The other domains in the original group were com, edu, gov, mil, and net. Org was originally intended for non-profit organizations or organizations of a non-commercial character that did not meet the requirements for other gTLDs. The MITRE Corporation was the first group to register an .org domain with mitre.org in July 1985. The TLD has been operated since January 1, 2003, by Public Interest Registry, who assumed the task from VeriSign Global Registry Services, a division of Verisign.

In November 2019, the Public Interest Registry (PIR) was to be sold by the Internet Society to shell company Ethos Capital for US$1.135 billion. The PIR also announced it would abandon its non-profit status to become a B Corporation. However, this move was criticized by non-profits and various digital rights groups on concerns that Ethos Capital, a private equity firm, would raise fees or censor the domain. The sale was blocked by Internet Corporation for Assigned Names and Numbers (ICANN) in April 2020 on the basis that the transfer of control of the domain to the private equity firm would create "unacceptable uncertainty" for non-profits that relied on the .org domain.

== Registrations ==
Registrations of subdomains are processed via accredited registrars worldwide. Anyone can register a second-level domain within org, without restrictions. In some instances subdomains are being used also by commercial sites, such as craigslist.org. According to the ICANN Dashboard (Domain Name) report, the composition of the TLD is diverse, including cultural institutions, associations, sports teams, religious, and civic organizations, open-source software projects, schools, environmental initiatives, social, and fraternal organizations, health organizations, legal services, as well as clubs, and community-volunteer groups. In some cases subdomains have been created for crisis management.

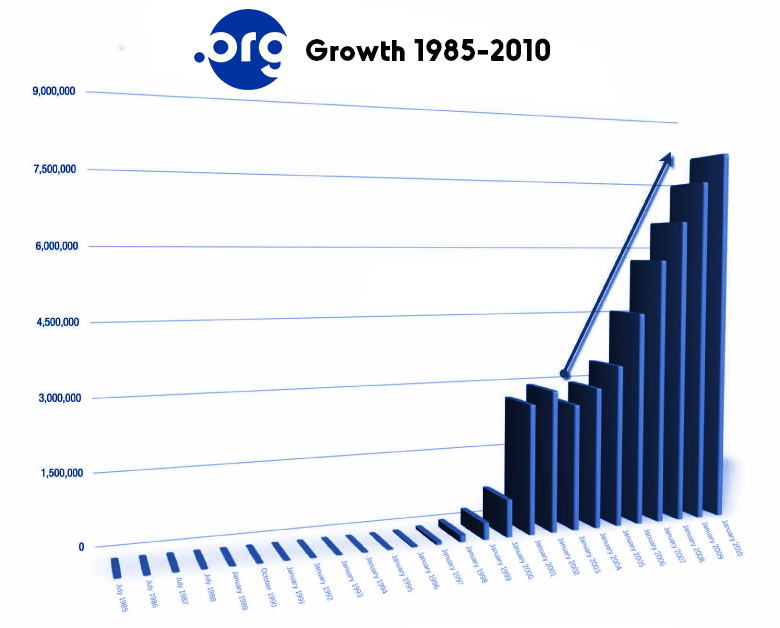
The number of .org domains registered with the Public Interest Registry

Although organizations anywhere in the world may register subdomains, many countries, such as Australia (au), Canada (ca), Japan (jp), Argentina (ar), Bolivia (bo), Uruguay (uy), Turkey (tr), Somalia (so), Sierra Leone (sl), Russia (ru), Bangladesh (bd), India (in) and the United Kingdom (uk), have established a second-level domain with a similar purpose under their ccTLD. Such second-level domains are usually named org or or.

Hosted website builders such as Wix, Weebly, and Duda allow users to connect custom domain names, including those ending in .org, to websites created on their platforms.

In 2009, the .org domain consisted of more than 8 million registered domain names, 8.8 million in 2010, and 9.6 million in 2011. The Public Interest Registry registered the ten millionth .ORG domain in June, 2012. When the 9.5-millionth second-level domain was registered in December 2011, org became the third largest gTLD.

As of November 2019, according to the Tranco ranking of the top 1M global domains, domains under .org were about 6 % of the top 1000 and 7 % of the top 100 thousand and 1 million domains.

=== Internationalized domain names ===
The .org domain registry allows the registration of selected internationalized domain names (IDNs) as second-level domains. For German, Danish, Hungarian, Icelandic, Korean, Latvian, Lithuanian, Polish, and Swedish IDNs, this has been possible since 2005. Spanish IDN registrations have been possible since 2007.

== Domain name security ==
On June 2, 2009, The Public Interest Registry announced that the org domain is the first open generic top-level domain and the largest registry overall that has signed its DNS zone with Domain Name System Security Extensions (DNSSEC). This allows the verification of the origin authenticity and integrity of DNS data by conforming DNS clients.

As of June 23, 2010, DNSSEC was enabled for individual second-level domains, starting with 13 registrars.

== Cost of registration ==
Since 2003, the Public Interest Registry (PIR) charged its accredited registrars a capped price of US$9.05 per year for each domain name. The registrars may set their charges to end users without restrictions.

In April 2019, ICANN proposed an end to the price cap of .org domains and effectively removed it in July in spite of having received 3,252 opposing comments and only six in favor. A few months later, the owner of the domain, the Public Interest Registry, proposed to sell the domain to investment firm Ethos Capital. After intense criticism from nonprofit groups and significant figures in Internet history, the proposal was scrapped.

== Regulatory positions ==
In March 2001, the Ethics Committee of the State Bar of Arizona issued Ethics Opinion 01-05, which discussed the limitations to which a law firm is subject when creating or using a website address for its law firm website. Among other conclusions, the Committee opined that a for-profit law firm may not use a domain name that contains the suffix ".org", on the ground that such use "creates a false impression that the firm either is a non-profit or is in some way specifically affiliated with a non-profit".

In light of the widespread use of the domain "org" by for-profit organizations in the years since Ariz. Ethics Op. 01-05 was issued, the Committee, reconsidering the matter in December 2011, concluded that the possibility that the public will be misled by a for-profit law firm's use of "org" in its website address is remote, as a reasonable person, desiring to verify whether an entity is non-profit, would not rely solely on the entity's website address.

Therefore, the mere use of "org" by a for-profit law firm was declared not to be a violation of the Arizona Rules of Professional Conduct, and Opinion 01-05 was modified accordingly. Arizona lawyers were cautioned, however, that a lawyer or law firm may not use a domain name that falsely implies that the lawyer or law firm is affiliated with a particular non-profit organization or with a governmental entity or that otherwise is false or misleading.
