= .art (top-level domain) =

Internet top-level domain

- Introduced: May 10, 2017
- TLD type: Generic top-level domain
- Status: Active
- Registry: UK Creative Ideas Limited
- Sponsor: None
- Intended use: Creative community
- Actual use: Artists, art-related businesses and organizations
- Registered domains: 287,651 (5 August 2025)
- Documents: ICANN registry agreement
- Dispute policies: UDRP, Dot-ART Policies
- DNSSEC: Yes
- Registry website: Art.art

.art is a generic top-level domain (gTLD) in the Domain Name System of the Internet.

== History ==
The .art TLD was entered into a registry agreement on March 24, 2016, between ICANN and UK Creative Ideas Limited, and it became available to the public on 10 May 2017.

The founder of UK Creative Ideas and of .art is London-based investor and art collector Ulvi Kasimov, who invested $25 million on the domain initiative. There were nine other competing bids to operate the top-level domain.

Domains were registered by tech companies, luxury brands, and cultural organizations; some early registrations were purchased by Apple, Instagram, Kickstarter, and Rolex, along with the Louvre, Tate, the Centre Pompidou, the Art Institute of Chicago, and the Guggenheim. .art domain names can be assigned directly to artworks (rather than to institutions or individuals). This new service of storing and identifying art objects in WHOIS, for which the .art registry received a United States patent in 2020, is called Digital Twin.

By negotiating a unique agreement with ICANN,.art integrated into its domain registration forms the option of adding specific description fields. These fields contain information based on the Object ID – a universal art object identification standard developed by J. Paul Getty Trust and adopted by UNESCO, ICOM, and major law enforcement agencies. The standard contains necessary information about an artwork and its owner.

== ID.art Platform ==
The ID.art platform by .ART offers credentialing and a suite of services to digitize, promote, and monetize both physical and digital objects.

== Charity and Community Involvement ==
In February 2023, the .ART domain registry founders, Ulvi and Reikhan Kasimovs, launched the Art Therapy Initiative, pledging US$1 million to support graduate fellowships at George Washington University’s Art Therapy Program. This initiative aims to raise awareness about the benefits of art therapy—especially in the wake of the pandemic—by donating a portion of .ART domain sales revenue to nonprofit partners. The Art Therapy Program at GW offers comprehensive training and internships, and the fellowship seeks to attract diverse students to the field. The initiative also includes partnerships with artists like Phil Hansen to promote art therapy’s role in mental wellness.

For the past seven years, .ART has partnered with GP Bullhound Allstars to support the Digital Innovation in Art Award, celebrating leaders at the intersection of art and technology. GP Bullhound, a London-based technology advisory and investment firm, provides transaction advice and capital to top entrepreneurs and founders worldwide. The award recognizes individuals and companies whose projects merge art with technological innovation, including the use of AI to transform the art market.

In 2024, .ART announced that several of its publications were accepted into the Library of Congress, recognizing their impact on the arts and culture sector. This includes works like ".ART ODYSSEY – NAVIGATING THE FUTURE OF ART", “The New Flood” by Ulvi Kasimov, and "Memories of Baku", which explore art, technology, and cultural heritage. These publications, donated by .ART founder Ulvi Kasimov, highlight the organization’s commitment to innovation at the intersection of art and technology.

On July 11, 2024, .ART Registry and HUG announced a strategic partnership to support artists' digital presence.

In December 2024 .ART acquired HUG (www.Hug.art) which was co-founded by Randi Zuckerberg and Debbie Soon.
