= U.ae =

Official government website of the UAE

u.ae

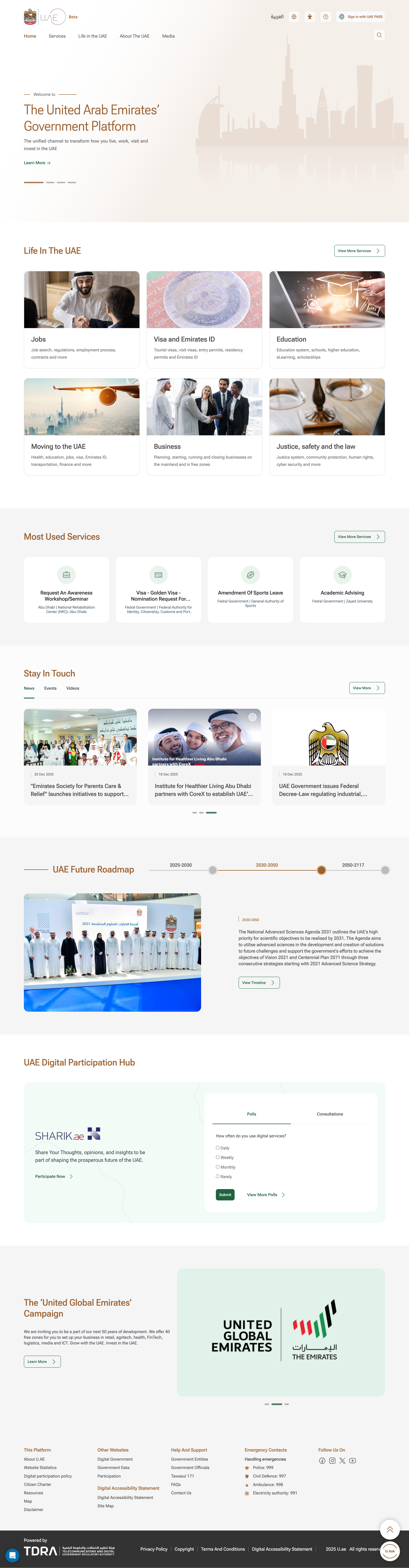
- Screenshot Screenshot of u.ae's landing page as of 30 December 2025
- Website type: Government web portal
- Available in: 2 languages
- List of languages English and Arabic
- Country of origin: United Arab Emirates
- Owner: Government of the United Arab Emirates
- Creator: Telecommunications and Digital Government Regulatory Authority (TDRA)
- Website: u.ae
- Commercial: No
- Registration: Optional
- Launched: 2001; 25 years ago (as government.ae and govu.ae)
- Current status: Online

u.ae (stylised as U.AE or GOVu.ae) is the official national platform of the Government of the United Arab Emirates (UAE). It provides information about the UAE, its government system and its services. It is the first government website and domain name composed of a single letter at the second level.

== History ==
The portal first launched in 2001 as a static site and later developed into a more interactive platform.

In July 2019, the UAE government announced that its official portal would use the domain u.ae, describing it as the first government domain name composed of a single letter at the second level. By August 2019, both government.ae and govu.ae had their URLs redirected to u.ae.

In July 2023, the Telecommunications and Digital Government Regulatory Authority (TDRA) launched an updated version of the platform, incorporating generative artificial intelligence features.

== Login ==
Users can login using the UAE Pass, a national digital identity for citizens, residents and visitors in UAE.

== See also ==
- Government of the United Arab Emirates
- Telecommunications and Digital Government Regulatory Authority
- Electronic government
