= Teltone =

Telephone communications manufacturer

Teltone Corporation
- Company type: Public
- Traded as: Nasdaq: TTNC (1968-2008)
- Industry: Computer network products
- Founded: 1968; 58 years ago
- Defunct: June 2008; 18 years ago
- Fate: Acquired by Industrial Defender
- Successor: Industrial Defender
- Website: teltone.com at the Wayback Machine (archived 2007-02-05)

Teltone Corporation was a telephone communications product manufacturer.

== History ==
Teltone was established in 1968 in Washington. The company produced telecommunications equipment including products that transmitted computer data over telephony infrastructure. Over time, the company increasingly developed and supported industrial monitoring applications and electronic security products. CEO from 2000 was Debra L. Griffith, formerly Teltone CFO.

== Fate ==
Teltone was acquired by Industrial Defender in June 2008, subsequently acquired by Lockheed Martin in March 2014. Both the Teltone and Industrial Defender brands continue.
