= .gov =

Internet top-level domain used by the US government

- Introduced: January 1, 1985; 41 years ago
- TLD type: Sponsored top-level domain
- Status: Active
- Registry: Cybersecurity and Infrastructure Security Agency
- Sponsor: Cybersecurity and Infrastructure Security Agency
- Intended use: Governmental entities
- Actual use: Only the United States government; formerly only federal government but later expanded to include state and local government
- Registration restrictions: Must meet eligibility requirements and submit authorization letter
- Structure: Registrations at second level permitted
- Documents: RFC 920; RFC 1591; RFC 2146
- Dispute policies: None
- DNSSEC: Yes
- Registry website: get.gov

The domain name .gov is a sponsored top-level domain (sTLD) in the Domain Name System of the Internet. The name is derived from the word government, indicating its restricted use by government entities in the United States. The TLD is administered by the Cybersecurity and Infrastructure Security Agency (CISA), a component of the United States Department of Homeland Security.

gov is one of the original six top-level domains, defined in RFC 920. Though "originally intended for any kind of government office or agency", only U.S.-based government entities may register gov domain names, a result of the Internet originating as a U.S. government-sponsored research network.

Other countries typically delegate a second-level domain for government operations on their country-code top-level domain (ccTLD); for example, gov.uk is the domain for the Government of the United Kingdom, and gc.ca is the domain for the Government of Canada. The United States is the only country that has a government-specific top-level domain in addition to its ccTLD (us), a direct result of the United States federal government's role in the creation of the Internet.

gov domains are registered at get.gov.

== History ==
gov is one of the original top-level domains created in 1984 (the other five being com, org, edu, mil, and arpa). The first site registered was css.gov in June 1985.

Beginning in 1997, the General Services Administration (GSA) began administering gov. In February 2011, the GSA selected Verisign to manage the registry services, replacing Native Technologies, Inc.

Responsibility for the TLD was transferred to the Cybersecurity and Infrastructure Security Agency (CISA) under the DOTGOV Online Trust in Government Act of 2020, part of the Consolidated Appropriations Act, 2021.

In January 2023, CISA selected Cloudflare to replace Verisign in providing registry services. Cloudflare also provides authoritative DNS services for the gov domain.

== Use ==
Many governments in the United States use a gov domain, though some use .us (e.g., leg.state.nv.us), .com (e.g., myflorida.com), .org (e.g., lacity.org), or other TLDs (e.g., senate.mn). The full list of registered gov domains is published at get.gov/data.

During GSA's administration of gov, registration and annual renewal fees peaked at $400 per year. When CISA began managing the TLD in April 2021, all fees were removed.

Federal Executive branch policy requires the use of gov for civilian agencies, but some U.S. government-related websites use other domain names, including the United States Postal Service (e.g., usps.com) and various recruiting websites for armed services (e.g., goarmy.com). The United States Department of Defense and its subsidiary organizations typically use the mil sTLD instead of gov.

== Eligibility ==
U.S.-based government organizations and publicly controlled entities are eligible to obtain a gov domain. This includes federal, state, local, or territorial government, as well as any tribal government recognized by the federal government or a state government.

To register a gov domain, an authorization letter must be submitted to CISA. The signer of the letter differs by entity type, but it is typically an agency's head, chief information officer (CIO), or highest-ranking or elected official.

Historically, only U.S. federal government agencies were allowed to register a gov domain. In May 2002, GSA proposed a change that would open registration to state, local, and tribal governments in the U.S., a change that went into effect in March 2003.

In November 2019, before the transfer of gov to CISA, GSA's authorization process was shown to be weak after someone impersonated the mayor of Exeter, Rhode Island in an authorization letter and successfully gained control of exeterri.gov. In response, GSA said it had implemented additional fraud prevention controls, and CISA advocated for transferring the TLD from GSA.

== Policy ==
The DOTGOV Act requires that CISA maintain requirements that "minimize the risk of gov Internet domains whose names could mislead or confuse users". These include:

- Requested names must correspond with the requesting entity's organization's name or services.
- Generic terms are reserved for federal agencies, though generic words can be combined with state or local municipality names.
- Most non-federal domain types require a two-letter United States postal abbreviations or state name equivalent, though exceptions are made. Rules have been established for municipalities whose names are unique, who are well-known, or that are among the most populous cities and counties in the nation.

The Act also requires that gov domains not be used for political campaign or commercial purposes, and that domains are registered only by authorized individuals.

gov has been used to serve certain policy goals. As an action following Executive Order 13571, President Barack Obama restricted executive branch agencies from registering new gov domains in an attempt to eliminate unnecessary, redundant, or outdated sites. US government agencies used the gov registrar to make it easy for new registrants to opt-in to HTTPS preloading and to make it easier for the public to report potential security issues.

== Use by states and territories ==
As of August 2025, all states, the District of Columbia, and all territories except for the Northern Mariana Islands have operational domains in gov:

State or territory	Domain
Alabama	al.gov and alabama.gov
Alaska	alaska.gov
American Samoa	americansamoa.gov
Arizona	az.gov and arizona.gov
Arkansas	ar.gov and arkansas.gov
California	ca.gov
Colorado	co.gov and colorado.gov
Connecticut	ct.gov
Delaware	de.gov and delaware.gov
District of Columbia	dc.gov
Florida	fl.gov, florida.gov and myflorida.gov
Georgia	ga.gov and georgia.gov
Guam	guam.gov
Hawaii	hawaii.gov and ehawaii.gov
Idaho	idaho.gov
Illinois	illinois.gov
Indiana	in.gov and indiana.gov
Iowa	iowa.gov
Kansas	kansas.gov
Kentucky	ky.gov and kentucky.gov
Louisiana	la.gov and louisiana.gov
Maine	maine.gov
Maryland	md.gov and maryland.gov
Massachusetts	ma.gov, mass.gov and massachusetts.gov
Michigan	mi.gov and michigan.gov
Minnesota	mn.gov and minnesota.gov
Mississippi	ms.gov and mississippi.gov
Missouri	mo.gov and missouri.gov
Montana	mt.gov and montana.gov
Nebraska	ne.gov and nebraska.gov
Nevada	nv.gov and nevada.gov
New Hampshire	nh.gov
New Jersey	nj.gov and newjersey.gov
New Mexico	nm.gov and newmexico.gov
New York	ny.gov
North Carolina	nc.gov and northcarolina.gov
North Dakota	nd.gov and northdakota.gov
Ohio	ohio.gov
Oklahoma	ok.gov and oklahoma.gov
Oregon	oregon.gov
Pennsylvania	pa.gov
Puerto Rico	pr.gov
Rhode Island	ri.gov
South Carolina	sc.gov
South Dakota	sd.gov
Tennessee	tn.gov and tennessee.gov
Texas	texas.gov
Utah	utah.gov
Vermont	vt.gov and vermont.gov
Virgin Islands	vi.gov
Virginia	virginia.gov
Washington	wa.gov
West Virginia	wv.gov and westvirginia.gov
Wisconsin	wi.gov and wisconsin.gov
Wyoming	wy.gov, wyo.gov and wyoming.gov

== International equivalents ==
While the use of gov as a top-level domain is restricted to the United States, several other countries have second-level domains of the same name or similar semantics for governmental purposes, such as official government email systems or online information portals (like GOV.UK or u.ae). Note that the governments of some jurisdictions use alternate domains in public communications (for example, the Government of Canada adopted canada.ca as its main public-facing URL in the 2010s, and some Canadian provinces have made similar changes).

Country or Territory	Domain	Notes
Afghanistan	gov.af	
Åland	gov.ax	Part of Finland
Albania	gov.al	
Algeria	gov.dz	
Andorra	gov.ad	
Angola	gov.ao	
Antigua and Barbuda	gov.ag	
Argentina	gob.ar	Stands for the Spanish word gobierno
Armenia	gov.am	
Australia	gov.au	
Austria	gv.at	
Azerbaijan	gov.az	
Bahamas	gov.bs	
Bahrain	gov.bh	
Bangladesh	gov.bd	
Barbados	gov.bb	
Belarus	gov.by	
Belgium	gov.be	gov.be is for national matters, the Belgian Federal Government is using fgov.be and belgium.be
Belize	gov.bz	
Benin	gouv.bj	Stands for the French word gouvernement
Bhutan	gov.bt	
Bosnia and Herzegovina	gov.ba	
Botswana	gov.bw	
Brazil	gov.br	
Brunei	gov.bn	
Bulgaria	gov.bg	Only the Council of Ministers uses this site.
Burkina Faso	gov.bf	
Burundi	gov.bi	
Cambodia	gov.kh	
Canada	gc.ca	
New Brunswick	gnb.ca	Part of Canada. The previous gov.nb.ca remains active but deprecated due to the province's official bilingualism.
Quebec	gouv.qc.ca	Part of Canada
Other provinces and territories	gov.{xx}.ca	Parts of Canada. '{xx}' is the applicable province or territory's postal abbreviation.
Cameroon	gov.cm	
Cape Verde	gov.cv	
Central African Republic	gouv.cf	Stands for the French word gouvernement
Chad	gouv.td	
Chile	gob.cl or gov.cl	Stands for the Spanish word gobierno
China	gov.cn	
Hong Kong	gov.hk	Part of China
Macau	gov.mo	Part of China
Colombia	gov.co	
Comoros	gouv.km or gov.km	Stands for the French word gouvernement. gov.km is used by the General Directorate of Customs and Comores Telecom.
Croatia	gov.hr	
Cuba	gob.cu	
Cyprus	gov.cy	
Czech Republic	gov.cz	
Denmark	gov.dk	
Democratic Republic of the Congo	gouv.cd	Stands for the French word gouvernement
Djibouti	gouv.dj or gov.dj	Stands for the French word gouvernement. gov.dj is used by the Ministry of National Education and Vocational Training and the Djibouti Ports & Free Zones Authority.
Dominica	gov.dm	
Dominican Republic	gob.do or gov.do	Stands for the Spanish word gobierno
Ecuador	gob.ec	Stands for the Spanish word gobierno. gov.ec is formerly used.
Egypt	gov.eg	
El Salvador	gob.sv	Stands for the Spanish word gobierno
Estonia	gov.ee	
Eswatini	gov.sz	
Ethiopia	gov.et	
Federated States of Micronesia	gov.fm	
Fiji	gov.fj	
Finland	gov.fi	
France	gouv.fr	Stands for the French word gouvernement
Gabon	gouv.ga	Stands for the French word gouvernement
Georgia	gov.ge	
Germany	gov.de	
Ghana	gov.gh	
Greece	gov.gr	
Grenada	gov.gd	
Guatemala	gob.gt	Stands for the Spanish word gobierno
Guinea	gov.gn	
Guyana	gov.gy	
Haiti	gouv.ht	Stands for the French word gouvernement
Honduras	gob.hn	Stands for the Spanish word gobierno
Hungary	gov.hu	
Iceland	government.is	
India	gov.in	
Indonesia	go.id	
Iran	gov.ir	
Iraq	gov.iq	
Kurdistan Regional Government	gov.krd	Part of Iraq
Ireland	gov.ie	
Israel	gov.il	
Italy	gov.it	
Ivory Coast	gouv.ci	Stands for the French word gouvernement
Jamaica	gov.jm	
Japan	go.jp	
Jordan	gov.jo	
Kazakhstan	gov.kz	
Kenya	go.ke	
Kiribati	gov.ki	
Kuwait	gov.kw	
Kyrgyzstan	gov.kg	
Laos	gov.la	
Latvia	gov.lv	
Lebanon	gov.lb	
Lesotho	gov.ls	
Liberia	gov.lr	
Libya	gov.ly	
Lithuania	gov.lt	
Madagascar	gov.mg	
Malaysia	gov.my	
Malawi	gov.mw	
Maldives	gov.mv	
Malta	gov.mt	
Marshall Islands	gov.mh	Used only by the Ministry of Finance, Banking and Postal Services.
Mauritania	gov.mr	
Mexico	gob.mx	Stands for the Spanish word gobierno
Moldova	gov.md	
Monaco	gouv.mc	Stands for the French word gouvernement
Mongolia	gov.mn	
Montenegro	gov.me	
Morocco	gov.ma	
Mozambique	gov.mz	
Myanmar (Burma)	gov.mm	
Namibia	gov.na	
Nauru	gov.nr	
Nepal	gov.np	
Netherlands	gov.nl or government.nl	gov.nl is not currently in use and is (as of June 2026) being explored as a possible future uniform domain name extension for the government of the Netherlands.
Aruba	gov.aw	Part of the Kingdom of the Netherlands
Nicaragua	gob.ni	
New Caledonia	gouv.nc	Part of French overseas
New Zealand	govt.nz	
Nigeria	gov.ng	
North Korea	gov.kp	
North Macedonia	gov.mk	
Oman	gov.om	
Pakistan	gov.pk	
Panama	gob.pa	
Palestine	gov.ps	
Papua New Guinea	gov.pg	
Paraguay	gov.py	
Peru	gob.pe	Stands for the Spanish word gobierno
Philippines	gov.ph	
Poland	gov.pl	
Portugal	gov.pt	
Qatar	gov.qa	
Republic of the Congo	gouv.cg	Stands for the French word gouvernement
Romania	gov.ro	
Russia	gov.ru	
Rwanda	gov.rw	
Salomon Islands	gov.sb	
Samoa	gov.ws	
São Tomé and Príncipe	gov.st	
Saudi Arabia	gov.sa	
Senegal	gouv.sn	Stands for the French word gouvernement
Serbia	gov.rs	
Seychelles	gov.sc	
Sierra Leone	gov.sl	
Singapore	gov.sg	
Slovakia	gov.sk	
Slovenia	gov.si	
Somalia	gov.so	
South Africa	gov.za	
South Korea	go.kr	
South Sudan	gov.ss	
Spain	gob.es	Stands for the Spanish word gobierno
Sri Lanka	gov.lk	
Sudan	gov.sd	
Sweden	gov.se	
Switzerland	admin.ch	
Syria	gov.sy	
Taiwan (Republic of China)	gov.tw	
Tajikistan	gov.tj	
Tanzania	go.tz	
Thailand	go.th	
The Gambia	gov.gm	
Timor-Leste	gov.tl	
Togo	gouv.tg	Stands for the French word gouvernement
Tonga	gov.to	
Trinidad and Tobago	gov.tt	
Tunisia	gov.tn	
Turkey	gov.tr	
Turkmenistan	gov.tm	
Ukraine	gov.ua	
United Arab Emirates	gov.ae or govu.ae	
United Kingdom	gov.uk	
Scotland	gov.scot	Part of the United Kingdom
Wales	gov.wales	Part of the United Kingdom
Guernsey	gov.gg	Crown dependency
Jersey	gov.je	Crown dependency
Isle of Man	gov.im	Crown dependency
Anguilla	gov.ai	British overseas territory
Bermuda	gov.bm	British overseas territory
British Virgin Islands	gov.vg	British overseas territory
Cayman Islands	gov.ky	British overseas territory
Falkland Islands	gov.fk	British overseas territory
Pitcairn Islands	government.pn	British overseas territory
Turks & Caicos Islands	gov.tc	British overseas territory
Uganda	go.ug	
Uruguay	gub.uy	
Uzbekistan	gov.uz	
Vanuatu	gov.vu	
Venezuela	gob.ve	Stands for the Spanish word gobierno
Vietnam	chinhphu.vn or gov.vn	
Yemen	gov.ye	
Zambia	gov.zm	
Zimbabwe	gov.zw	

== See also ==
- usa.gov
- us
