= IAHC =

Internet domain name assignment committee

Prior to the globalization of the Internet, its assignment of domain names was administered within the research and academic communities through the Internet Assigned Numbers Authority (IANA). As the Internet grew to a global service, in the 1990s, there was increasing pressure to add more "generic" top-level domain names, beyond the initial set, such as .com and .org and the two-letter country codes. Extensive debate within the Internet operational community did not resolve this.

In late 1996, the International Ad Hoc Committee (IAHC) was formed, composed of members named by a variety of Internet and International sponsoring organizations. The committee was a temporary, international, multi-organization effort tasked with specifying administrative and management policies for generic top-level domains (gTLDs).

== Sponsoring Organizations ==
- Internet Society (ISOC)
- Internet Assigned Numbers Authority (IANA)
- Internet Architecture Board (IAB)
- Federal Networking Council (FNC)
- International Telecommunication Union (ITU)
- International Trademark Association (INTA)
- World Intellectual Property Organization (WIPO)

Members of IAHC:

- Sally Abel
- Dave Crocker
- Perry E. Metzger
- Jun Murai
- Hank Nussbacher
- Robert Shaw
- Donald M. Heath
- Geoff Huston
- George Strawn
- David W. Maher
- Albert Tramposch
- Committee outside counsel was Stuart Levi

== Results ==
The IAHC produced a draft proposal with a number of administrative recommendations, beyond the set of candidate gTLD names. These included:

- Use of the term generic topic-level domain (gTLD), rather than "international" TLD
- A registrary/registrar model, as currently employed under ICANN
- A policy for resolution of trademark-related domain name disputes that became the basis for the Uniform Dispute Resolution Policy (UDRP) that is currently part of ICANN policies.
- Notification of name assignments prior to issuance, in case of trademark concerns

The group's work culminated in a "Memorandum of Understanding". It describes a procedure of allocation and administration for domain names, specifically top-level domains. The "Generic Top Level Domain Memorandum of Understanding" (gTLD-MoU) was open to signature by any organization, with approximately 226 groups doing so.

The organization was dissolved on 1 May 1997. Its effort was subsumed under the authority of ICANN. When the U.S. government's activities concerning Internet Domain Name administration issued its preliminary "Green Paper" in 1998, the efforts of the IAHC were not referenced. However, the final "White Paper" gave credit to the IAHC efforts: "The IAHC issued a draft plan in December 1996 that introduced unique and thoughtful concepts for the evolution of DNS administration." The structure of ICANN, including the UDRP and the registrar/registry construct, was ultimately based on the substance of the proposals in the IAHC gTLD-MoU.

== Proposed TLDs ==
The IAHC proposed seven new top-level domains:

.arts	culture and entertainment
.firm	businesses
.info	information services
.nom	personal nomenclature
.rec	recreation and entertainment
.store	businesses selling goods
.web	World Wide Web related

The gTLD-MoU interim Policy Oversight Committee replaced .store with .shop.

The IAHC and gTLD-MOU effort did not produce implementation of these names. (The .info that now exists came from a later proposal under ICANN.)
