= .web =

Proposed top-level internet domain

web
- Logo of the .web registry site
- Introduced: 2026
- Structure: Registrations are directly at second level
- Documents: ICANN official auction schedule
- Registry website: verisign.com

.web is a new generic top-level domain (TLD) that is operated by Verisign. Trademarked and Premium second level domains are expected to be available in late 2026 and General Availability (GA) is expected in Q1 2027 or earlier. .web pricing is not restricted like .com and .net.

== History ==
=== Designation auction ===
The right to operate the domain .web was won by Nu Dot Co LLC at an auction, which was primarily funded by Verisign, for a price of $135 million, equivalent to $181 million in 2025. The ICANN auction of last resort that started on July 27, 2016, and was completed on July 28, 2016. ICANN will retain all the proceeds from this auction. TLD .web was added to the official root July 23, 2026.

Seven companies were bidding for the right to operate .web:

- Nu Dot Co, LLC (Straat), funded by Verisign
- Charleston Road Registry, Inc. (Google)
- Web.com Group, Inc.
- DotWeb, Inc.
- Ruby Glen, LLC
- Schlund Technologies GmbH (United Internet)
- Afilias Domains No. 3 Limited

=== Delays ===
Although Nu Dot Co LLC won the rights to operate the .web domain in 2016, the release of the domain has been postponed by a series of events.

The release of gTLD .web was initially postponed due to Ruby Glen, LCC. On August 8, 2016, they filed an amended complaint against ICANN, which began July 22, 2016. The major complaint was that Verisign planned to use Nu Dot Co LLC to acquire the .web domain. The complaint was dismissed on November 28, 2016. However, the dismissal was appealed on December 20, 2016.

The Antitrust Division of the U.S. Department of Justice opened an investigation concerning antitrust issues with ICANN on February 9, 2017. The investigation closed on January 10, 2018.

On February 23, 2018, applicant Afilias, who was the second highest bidder, requested documents from ICANN.

On May 19, 2022, ICANN's BAMC (Board Accountability Mechanisms Committee) decided to ask the involved parties to rehash what had happened by sending an official letter in the form of an email to all the entities involved in the .web bidding.

On July 23, 2026 Verisign announced that they had resolved all previous disputes successfully and are now the Registry Operator for .web

=== Registry ===
Verisign is the registry for the .web TLD.

.web was previously a prospective registry, but never worked in the official root, by Image Online Design 1995. It originated when Jon Postel, then running the top level of the Domain Name System by himself, proposed the addition of new top-level domains to be run by different registries. Since internet tradition at the time emphasized "rough consensus and running code", Christopher Ambler, who ran Image Online Design, saw this as meaning that his company could get a new TLD into the root by starting up a functional registry for it. After asking and receiving permission from IANA to do so, IOD promoted web, but the TLD did not work on the internet and IOD never received the ICANN approval needed to do so.

On February 7, 2013, the United States District Court for the Central District of California approved a motion to dismiss the complaint from ICANN.

== Fictional use ==
Some movies used .web domains for fictional companies. For example, the film Next Day Air has advertised on one of their trucks the link www.nda.web. Skyfall advertises www.868000.web on the side of a taxi during a pursuit scene. However, these domains were not yet operational.
