= Generic top-level domain =

Top level domain without country association

Historical generic TLDs
| Domain | Intended use |
|---|---|
| com | Mainly for commercial entities, but unrestricted |
| org | Originally for organizations not clearly falling within the other gTLDs, now unrestricted |
| net | Originally for network infrastructures, now unrestricted |
| edu | Educational use, but now primarily for third-level colleges and universities |
| gov | Governmental use, but now primarily for US governmental entities and agencies |
| mil | Military use, but now primarily for US military only |
Full list of gTLDs

Generic top-level domains (gTLDs) are one of the categories of top-level domains (TLDs) maintained by the Internet Assigned Numbers Authority (IANA) for use in the Domain Name System of the Internet. A top-level domain is the last level of every fully qualified domain name. They are called generic for historical reasons; initially, they were contrasted with country-specific TLDs in RFC 920.

The core group of generic top-level domains consists of the com, net, org, biz, and info domains. In addition, the domains name and pro are also considered generic; however, these are designated as restricted, because registrations within them require proof of eligibility within the guidelines set for each.

Historically, the group of generic top-level domains included domains created in the early development of the domain name system, that are now sponsored by designated agencies or organizations and are restricted to specific types of registrants. Thus, domains edu, gov, int, and mil are now considered sponsored top-level domains, along with other themed top-level domains like jobs. The entire group of domains that do not have a geographic or country designation (see country-code top-level domain) is still often referred to by the term generic TLDs.

The number of gTLDs as of March 2018 exceeds 1,200.

== Types ==
Overall, IANA distinguishes the following groups of top-level domains:

- infrastructure top-level domain (.arpa)
- generic top-level domains (gTLD)
- restricted generic top-level domains (grTLD)
- sponsored top-level domains (sTLD)
- country code top-level domains (ccTLD)
- internationalized top-level domains (IDNs)
  - internationalized country code top-level domains (IDN ccTLD)
- testing top-level domains

== History ==
The initial set of generic top-level domains, defined by RFC 920 in October 1984, was a set of "general purpose domains": com, edu, gov, mil, org. The net domain was added with the first implementation of these domains. The com, net, and org TLDs, despite their originally specified goals, are now open to use for any purpose.

In November 1988, another TLD was introduced, int. This TLD was introduced in response to NATO's request for a domain name that adequately reflected its character as an international organization. It was also originally planned to be used for some Internet infrastructure databases, such as ip6.int, the IPv6 equivalent of in-addr.arpa. However, in May 2000, the Internet Architecture Board proposed to exclude infrastructure databases from the int domain. All new databases of this type would be created in arpa (a legacy domain from the conversion of ARPANET), and existing usage would move to arpa wherever feasible, which led to the use of ip6.arpa for IPv6 reverse lookups.

By the mid-1990s, there was discussion of the introduction of more TLDs. Jon Postel, as head of IANA, invited applications from interested parties. In early 1995, Postel created "Draft Postel", an Internet draft containing the procedures to create new domain name registries and new TLDs. Draft Postel created a number of small committees to approve the new TLDs. Because of the increasing interest, a number of large organizations took over the process under the Internet Society's umbrella. This second attempt involved setting up a temporary organization called the International Ad Hoc Committee (IAHC). On February 4, 1997, the IAHC issued a report ignoring the Draft Postel recommendations and instead recommending the introduction of seven new TLDs (arts, firm, info, nom, rec, store, and web).

In September 1998, the Internet Corporation for Assigned Names and Numbers (ICANN) was created to take over the task of managing domain names. After a call for proposals (August 15, 2000) and a brief period of public consultation, ICANN announced on November 16, 2000, its selection of seven new TLDs: aero, biz, coop, info, museum, name, and pro.

biz, info, and museum were activated in June 2001, name and coop in January 2002, pro in May 2002, and aero later in 2002. pro became a gTLD in May 2002, but did not become fully operational until June 2004.

ICANN added further TLDs, starting with a set of sponsored top-level domains. The application period for these was from December 15, 2003, to March 16, 2004; it resulted in ten applications. Of these, ICANN approved asia, cat, jobs, mobi, tel and travel. In March 2011, xxx was approved (one year after an independent review found ICANN had broken its own bylaws by rejecting the application in 2007). Of the remaining applications (post, mail and an alternative tel proposal), post was introduced in 2012.

On June 26, 2008, during the 32nd International Public ICANN Meeting in Paris, ICANN started a new process of TLD naming policy to take a "significant step forward on the introduction of new generic top-level domains." This program envisioned the availability of many new or already proposed domains, as well as a new application and implementation process. Observers believed that the new rules could result in hundreds of new gTLDs being registered.

In subsequent years, the expansion of the domain name system led to broader adoption of gTLDs across a wide range of websites and online services. Sites created within hosted website builders, including Wix, Weebly, and Duda, use gTLDs such as .com and .net in their integrated domain registration services.

=== New top-level domains ===
The introduction of several generic top-level domains over the years had not stopped the demand for more gTLDs; ICANN received many proposals for the establishment of new top-level domains. Proponents argued for a variety of models, ranging from adoption of policies for unrestricted gTLDs (see above) to chartered gTLDs for specialized uses by specialized organizations.

In 2008, a new initiative foresaw a stringent application process for new domains, adhering to a restricted naming policy for open gTLDs, community-based domains, and internationalized domain names (IDNs). According to a guidebook published by ICANN, a community-based gTLD is "a gTLD that is operated for the benefit of a defined community consisting of a restricted population." All other domains fall under the category open gTLD, which "is one that can be used for any purpose consistent with the requirements of the application and evaluation criteria, and with the registry agreement. An open gTLD may or may not have a formal relationship with an exclusive registrant or user population. It may or may not employ eligibility or use restrictions."

The establishment of new gTLDs under this program required the management of registrar relationships, the operation of a domain registry, and demonstration of technical (as well as financial) capacity for such operations.

A fourth version of the draft applicant guidebook (DAG4) was published in May 2011. On June 20, 2011, ICANN's board voted to end most restrictions on the creation of generic top-level domain names (gTLDs) – at which time 22 gTLDs were available. Companies and organizations would be able to choose essentially arbitrary top-level Internet domains. The use of non-Latin characters (such as Cyrillic, Arabic, Chinese, etc.) would also be allowed in gTLDs. ICANN began accepting applications for new gTLDs on January 12, 2012. A survey by registrar Melbourne IT considered entertainment and financial services brands most likely to apply for new gTLDs for their brands. The initial price to apply for a new gTLD was $185,000. ICANN expected that the first batch of new gTLDs would be operational by September 2013. ICANN expected the new rules to significantly change the face of the internet. Peter Thrush, chairman of ICANN's board of directors, stated after the vote: "Today's decision will usher in a new internet age. We have provided a platform for the next generation of creativity and inspiration. Unless there is a good reason to restrain it, innovation should be allowed to run free." Industry analysts predicted 500–1000 new gTLDs, mostly reflecting names of companies and products, but also cities, and generic names like bank and sport. According to Theo Hnarakis, chief executive of Melbourne IT, the decision would "allow corporations to better take control of their brands. For example, apple or ipad would take customers right to those products." In agreement, Nick Wood, Managing Director of Valideus, suggested "Your own gTLD demonstrates confidence and vision and may accelerate your brand and its value. An internet address at the Top Level is far better than registration at the 'low rent' Second Level." However, some companies, like Pepsi, ruled out a branded gTLD.

== Popularity ==
The most popular gTLDs as of 2018 are as follows.

=== Top TLDs ===
Top 20
| Rank | .TLD | Domains | Change | Alexa^{a} | Change |
|---|---|---|---|---|---|
| 1 | .top | 2,911,167 | 26,293 | 1,075 | 24 |
| 2 | .loan | 2,226,603 | 8,129 | 85 | 2 |
| 3 | .xyz | 1,813,234 | -1,803 | 1,845 | 36 |
| 4 | .club | 1,013,411 | 8,228 | 1,625 | 31 |
| 5 | .online | 782,883 | 859 | 1,377 | 38 |
| 6 | .vip | 728,011 | -293 | 109 | 4 |
| 7 | .win | 602,628 | -1,553 | 474 | 13 |
| 8 | .shop | 486,062 | 43 | 241 | 11 |
| 9 | .ltd | 449,214 | -13 | 49 | 2 |
| 10 | .men | 433,490 | 1,973 | 90 | 3 |
| 11 | .site | 431,844 | 812 | 924 | 25 |
| 12 | .work | 383,064 | 3,639 | 134 | 3 |
| 13 | .stream | 321,023 | 328 | 280 | 11 |
| 14 | .bid | 318,405 | -619 | 184 | 4 |

=== Top City TLDs ===
Top 20 Cities
| Rank | .TLD | Domains | Change | Alexa^{a} | Change |
|---|---|---|---|---|---|
| 38 | .tokyo | 96,888 | 436 | 111 | 2 |
| 43 | .london | 80,116 | -3 | 43 | 1 |
| 47 | .nyc | 68,663 | 5 | 88 | 2 |
| 57 | .berlin | 52,788 | -3 | 33 | 1 |
| 86 | .amsterdam | 29,562 | 13 | 12 | Steady |
| 94 | .hamburg | 23,882 | Steady | 7 | Steady |
| 105 | .boston | 22,033 | 4 | 0 | Steady |
| 109 | .paris | 19,893 | 11 | 16 | Steady |
| 117 | .vegas | 18,722 | 10 | 16 | Steady |
| 121 | .moscow | 18,487 | 16 | 12 | Steady |
| 140 | .miami | 15,051 | 7 | 2 | Steady |
| 170 | .istanbul | 11,938 | -4 | 17 | 1 |
| 195 | .melbourne | 9,802 | -1 | 4 | Steady |
| 199 | .sydney | 9,326 | -8 | 2 | Steady |
| 228 | .brussels | 7,252 | 6 | 9 | Steady |
| 293 | .capetown | 4,616 | 11 | 0 | Steady |
| 441 | .rio | 1,051 | 2 | 6 | Steady |

- ^aThe number of new gTLD sites found for each TLD in the latest Alexa Top 1 Million list

== Terminology ==
Unrestricted generic top-level domains are those domains that are available for registration by any person or organization for any use. The prominent gTLDs in this group are com, net, org, and info. However, info was the only one of these, and the first, that was explicitly chartered as unrestricted. The others initially had a specific target audience. However, due to lack of enforcement, they acquired an unrestricted character, which was later grandfathered.

=== Sponsored sTLD ===
The term sponsored top-level domain is derived from the fact that these domains are based on theme concepts proposed by private agencies or organizations that establish and enforce rules restricting the eligibility of registrants to use the TLD. For example, the aero TLD is sponsored by the Société Internationale de Télécommunications Aéronautiques, which limits registrations to members of the air-transport industry.

The new gTLD program saw the arrival of many such top-level domains, with a restricted open policy, eligible to those active in a regulated industry, such as .pharma or .bank, or in other industrial domains such as .safety

=== Geographic gTLD ===
A geographic TLD (or GeoTLD) is a generic top-level domain using the name of or invoking an association with a geographical, geopolitical, ethnic, linguistic, or cultural community. As of 2009, only two GeoTLDs existed: the sponsored domains .cat, for the Catalan language and culture and .asia; as of 2014 there were many more, including .kiwi, .paris, .scot and .gal, but many others are being added regularly.

=== Brand gTLD ===
Brands have also applied to get their brand as a top-level domain. Specification 13 is an addendum to the registry contract that describes specific provisions to brands to run their Top Level Domain in a closed fashion. 517 applications to qualify to Spec 13 were made to ICANN, 36 requests were rejected by ICANN or withdrawn by the applicant, 4 are pending review.

In 2018, Spamhaus rated .men as the worst top-level domain in terms of spam and scamming. .men comes top with 60.6% of its 73,000 domains identified as "bad", resulting in a badness index of 6.48. The company that runs .men, GRS Domains also runs the third worst registry – .loan – with 59 percent bad domains and a 6.22 index.

== Expansion of gTLDs ==
The new generic top-level domain (gTLD) application system opened on January 12, 2012. The application window was initially to close on April 12, 2012. However, ICANN's Chief Operating Officer, Akram Atallah, stated there was a glitch in the TLD application system leaving applicants' information visible to others. The system was shut down to protect applicants' information, and measures were taken to resolve the situation.

ICANN re-opened the TLD Application System on May 21, allowing applicants to submit and review their applications until May 30, 2012.

On "Reveal Day" June 13, 2012, it was announced that ICANN received about 1,930 applications for new gTLDs, 751 of which were contested.

It was expected for the new gTLDs to go live in June 2013. However, as of March 2013 only non-Latin domains have gone through Initial Evaluation. The updated timeline suggested the new TLDs will go live in November 2013. On November 26, first seven new generic top-level domains, .bike, .clothing, .guru, .holdings, .plumbing, .singles, and .ventures, have entered the Sunrise period.

A lottery was held in December 2012 to determine the order in which ICANN would evaluate the 1,930 applications.

After the Application Window there was a public comment period from June 13, 2012, to September 26, 2012, in which the public could express their views on the individual new gTLD applications submitted.

Concerns were raised over Closed Generic applications in which the applicant would be the sole registrant for the TLD. In particular objections were raised by publishers over Amazon's .book application.

Of the technology giants, Google has filed for 101 new gTLDs, Amazon comes 2nd with 76, and Microsoft has filed for 11. The more specialized domain name companies include Donuts submitting the most (307) applications and Uniregistry pursuing 54 gTLDs.

=== New gTLD launches ===
On July 15, 2013, the first four new gTLD agreements were signed in Durban, South Africa. They all consisted of Top Level Domains in non-Latin characters:

- International Domain Registry Pty. Ltd.'s شبكة, Arabic for "web" or "network"
- Core Association's онлайн, Russian for "online"
- Core Association's сайт, Russian for "site"
- Spring Fields, LLC's 游戏, Chinese for "game"

On July 10, 2014 the 330th gTLD was delegated. On November 9, 2014, the 400th gTLD was delegated in the root. As of 3 May 2015, the number of new gTLDs available is 605.

The most popular gTLD has been .guru, launched in February 2014 and reached 50,000 domains in April 2014, briefly surpassed by .club between June 2 and June 9, 2014, with around 55,000 domains; .club was then surpassed by .xyz, which had more than 300,000 domains after one and a half months of existence. The growth of .xyz has been concentrated on one registrar due to a promotion they ran.

=== Criticism ===
Following the vote to expand gTLDs, many trade associations and large companies, led by the Association of National Advertisers, formed the Coalition for Responsible Internet Domain Oversight. The coalition opposes the expansion of gTLDs, citing "its deeply flawed justification, excessive cost and harm to brand owners." In a statement to the US Congress on December 9, 2011, National Restaurant Association vice president Scott DeFife stated, "Even beyond the financial toll the gTLD program will exact on millions of U.S. businesses, the Association believes that ICANN's program will confuse consumers by spreading Internet searches across hundreds or even thousands of new top-level domains."

Another opponent is Esther Dyson, the founding chairwoman of ICANN, who wrote that the expansion "will create jobs [for lawyers, marketers and others] but little extra value."

== New gTLD Next Round 2026 ==
ICANN has been preparing to roll out the subsequent round of New gTLD expansion but expected to open the second round of New gTLD Application window on 30 April 2026. The first draft of Applicant Guidebook was published on 30 May 2025 and the board had adopted the Applicant Guidebook during ICANN84 Dublin event.

In November 2024, ICANN opened up Applicant Support Program to support organizations and communities which are in need of financial support to apply for New gTLD. The application window to apply for financial support closed in December 2025, after being extended from November of the same year. ICANN has also mandated applicants to choose a registry backend service provider from ICANN's accredited RSP list which is expected to be published in early 2026.

ICANN released the Applicant Guide Book and other resources in December 2025.

== See also ==
- List of Internet top-level domains
- Pseudo-top-level domain
- Reserved domains
