= .com =

Internet top-level domain

com
- Introduced: January 1, 1985; 41 years ago
- Registry: Verisign
- Sponsor: None
- Intended use: Commercial entities
- Actual use: Used for general purposes and is widely regarded as the standard for TLDs
- Registered domains: 161 million (Q4 2025)
- Registration restrictions: None
- Structure: Registrations are conducted at second level.
- Documents: RFC 920; RFC 1591; ICANN registry agreement
- Dispute policies: UDRP
- DNSSEC: Yes
- IDN: Yes
- Registry website: yourdot.com

The domain com is a top-level domain (TLD) in the Domain Name System (DNS) of the Internet. Created in the first group of Internet domains in March of 1985, it is short for commercial, as it was originally intended for subdomains for commercial organizations. Later, the domain opened for general purposes.

The domain was originally administered by the United States Department of Defense, but is today operated by Verisign, and remains under ultimate jurisdiction of U.S. law. The .com domain is more commonly used than the more specific .us by American businesses and enterprises. Verisign registrations in the .com domain are processed via registrars accredited by ICANN. The registry accepts internationalized domain names.

The domain was one of the original TLDs of the Internet when the Domain Name System was implemented in January 1985, the others being edu, gov, mil, net, org, and int. It has grown into the largest top-level domain, and has lent its name to the dot-com bubble, the era of the late 1990s during which excessive speculation in Internet-related concepts and companies led to rapid growth in the use and adoption of the Internet.

== History ==
The domain com was one of the first set of top-level domains when the Domain Name System was first implemented for the Internet on January 1, 1985. The domain was administered by the U.S. Department of Defense, but the department contracted the domain maintenance to SRI International. SRI created DDN-NIC, also known as SRI-NIC, or simply the NIC (Network Information Center), then accessible online with the domain name nic.ddn.mil. Beginning October 1, 1991, an operations contract was awarded to Government Systems Inc. (GSI), which sub-contracted it to Network Solutions Inc. (NSI).

On January 1, 1993, the National Science Foundation assumed responsibility of maintenance, as com was primarily being used for non-defense interests. The NSF contracted operation to Network Solutions (NSI). In 1995, the NSF authorized NSI to begin charging registrants an annual fee for the first time since the domain's inception. Initially, the fee was US$50 (equivalent to $106 in 2025) per year, with US$35 going to NSI, and US$15 going to a government fund. New registrations had to pay for the first two years, making the new-domain registration fee US$100. In 1997, the United States Department of Commerce assumed authority over these first seven generic TLDs. It is currently operated by Verisign, which had acquired Network Solutions. Verisign later spun off Network Solutions' non-registry functions into a separate company that continues as a registrar. In the English language, the domain is often spelled with a leading period and commonly pronounced as dot-com, and has entered common parlance this way.

Although com domains were initially intended to designate commercial entities, the domain has had no restrictions for eligible registrants since the mid-1990s. With the commercialization and popularization of the Internet, the domain was opened to the public and quickly became the most common top-level domain for websites, email, and networking. Many companies that flourished in the period from 1997 to 2001—the time known as the "dot-com bubble"—incorporated the label com into company names; these became known as dot-coms or dot-com companies. The introduction of domain biz in 2001, which was aimed at companies that failed to register a suitable com-domain name, intended to make customers realize that they had arrived at a legitimate business website, although it did not achieve widespread use.

Although companies anywhere in the world can register com domains, many countries have a second-level domain with a similar purpose under their country code top-level domain (ccTLD), such as Australia (com.au), China (com.cn), Greece (com.gr), Israel (co.il), India (co.in), Indonesia (co.id), Japan (co.jp), Mexico (com.mx), Nepal (.com.np), Pakistan (.com.pk), South Korea (co.kr), Sri Lanka (com.lk), United Kingdom (co.uk), and Vietnam (.com.vn).

Many non-commercial sites and networks use com names to benefit from the perceived recognizability of a com domain. However, the registration statistics show varying popularity over the years.

In December 2011, Verisign reported that approximately 100 million com domains were registered. According to the Domain Name Industry Brief published in March 2020, which publishes every quarter, com domain registration totaled 145.4 million. As of March 2009, Verisign reported that 926 accredited registrars serve the domain.

On November 29, 2012, the U.S. Department of Commerce approved the renewal of the com Registry Agreement between Verisign, Inc., and ICANN. Through this agreement, Verisign managed the com registry until November 30, 2018.

== List of oldest second-level domains ==
The following are the 100 oldest still-existing registered com domains.

Rank	Creation date	Domain name
1	March 15, 1985	symbolics.com
2	April 24, 1985	BBN.com
3	May 24, 1985	think.com
4	July 11, 1985	MCC.com
5	September 30, 1985	DEC.com
6	November 7, 1985	northrop.com
7	January 9, 1986	xerox.com
8	January 17, 1986	SRI.com
9	March 3, 1986	HP.com
10	March 5, 1986	bellcore.com
11	March 19, 1986	IBM.com
11	March 19, 1986	sun.com
13	March 25, 1986	intel.com
13	March 25, 1986	TI.com
15	April 25, 1986	ATT.com
16	May 8, 1986	GMR.com
16	May 8, 1986	tek.com
18	July 10, 1986	FMC.com
18	July 10, 1986	UB.com
20	August 5, 1986	bell-atl.com
20	August 5, 1986	GE.com
20	August 5, 1986	grebyn.com
20	August 5, 1986	ISC.com
20	August 5, 1986	NSC.com
20	August 5, 1986	stargate.com
26	September 2, 1986	Boeing.com
27	September 18, 1986	ITCorp.com
28	September 29, 1986	siemens.com
29	October 18, 1986	pyramid.com
30	October 27, 1986	alphaCDC.com
30	October 27, 1986	BDM.com
30	October 27, 1986	fluke.com
30	October 27, 1986	inmet.com
30	October 27, 1986	kesmai.com
30	October 27, 1986	mentor.com
30	October 27, 1986	NEC.com
30	October 27, 1986	ray.com
30	October 27, 1986	rosemount.com
30	October 27, 1986	vortex.com
40	November 5, 1986	alcoa.com
40	November 5, 1986	GTE.com
42	November 17, 1986	adobe.com
42	November 17, 1986	AMD.com
42	November 17, 1986	DAS.com
42	November 17, 1986	data-IO.com
42	November 17, 1986	octopus.com
42	November 17, 1986	portal.com
42	November 17, 1986	teltone.com
49	December 11, 1986	3Com.com
49	December 11, 1986	amdahl.com

Rank	Creation date	Domain name
49	December 11, 1986	CCUR.com
49	December 11, 1986	CI.com
49	December 11, 1986	convergent.com
49	December 11, 1986	DG.com
49	December 11, 1986	peregrine.com
49	December 11, 1986	quad.com
49	December 11, 1986	SQ.com
49	December 11, 1986	tandy.com
49	December 11, 1986	TTI.com
49	December 11, 1986	unisys.com
61	January 19, 1987	CGI.com
61	January 19, 1987	CTS.com
61	January 19, 1987	SPDCC.com
64	February 19, 1987	apple.com
65	March 4, 1987	NMA.com
65	March 4, 1987	prime.com
67	April 4, 1987	philips.com
68	April 23, 1987	datacube.com
68	April 23, 1987	KAI.com
68	April 23, 1987	TIC.com
68	April 23, 1987	vine.com
72	April 30, 1987	NCR.com
73	May 14, 1987	cisco.com
73	May 14, 1987	RDL.com
75	May 20, 1987	SLB.com
76	May 27, 1987	parcplace.com
76	May 27, 1987	UTC.com
78	June 26, 1987	IDE.com
79	July 9, 1987	TRW.com
80	July 13, 1987	unipress.com
81	July 27, 1987	dupont.com
81	July 27, 1987	lockheed.com
83	July 28, 1987	rosetta.com
84	August 18, 1987	toad.com
85	August 31, 1987	quick.com
86	September 3, 1987	allied.com
86	September 3, 1987	DSC.com
86	September 3, 1987	SCO.com
89	September 22, 1987	gene.com
89	September 22, 1987	KCCS.com
89	September 22, 1987	spectra.com
89	September 22, 1987	WLK.com
93	September 30, 1987	mentat.com
94	October 14, 1987	WYSE.com
95	November 2, 1987	CFG.com
96	November 9, 1987	marble.com
97	November 16, 1987	cayman.com
97	November 16, 1987	entity.com
99	November 24, 1987	KSR.com
100	November 30, 1987	NYNEXST.com

== TLD extensions ==
After the success of the .com domain, CentralNic registered multiple TLD Extensions under the format: .Country.Com.

These TLD extensions are:

- .ar.com (Argentina, Discontinued)
- .au.com (Australia, Registry)
- .br.com (Brazil, Registry)
- .cn.com (China, Registry)
- .de.com (Germany, Registry)
- .eu.com (European Union, Registry)
- .gb.com (Great Britain, Discontinued)
- .gr.com (Greece, No official registrar)
- .hu.com (Hungary, Discontinued)
- .it.com (Italy, Registry)
- .uk.com (United Kingdom, Registry)
- .us.com (United States, Registry)
- .za.com (South Africa, No official registrar)

== See also ==
- List of most expensive domain names
