= Sunrise period =

Period of domain name registration reserved for trademark holders

The sunrise period of domain name registration is a special period during which trademark holders may preregister names that are the same or similar to their trademarks in order to avoid cybersquatting. This occurs prior to the general launch of the top-level domain (TLD). To register, the group or individual must be able to prove their prior right to the name. The sunrise period serves as a test period, and is followed by the landrush period and/or General Availability.

== Sunrise rules for the new gTLD program ==
In October 2013, the Trademark Clearinghouse announced new rules for sunrise periods for new generic top-level domains (gTLDs) that were rolling out as part of the New gTLD Program. There are now two types of sunrise periods:

=== End date sunrise ===
In this type of sunrise, the registry can announce the sunrise as late as the day the sunrise starts, but must run the sunrise for 60 days or more. Trademark owners have the duration of the sunrise period to submit a claim for a domain. At the end of the period, all the claims are registered by the registry and auctions are conducted if there is more than one claim for the same domain. This type of sunrise has significant benefits for rights holders.

=== Start date sunrise ===
In this type of sunrise, the registry must give 30 days' notice before commencing the sunrise. Once the sunrise starts, it must run for at least 30 days or more. Claims by trademark owners are processed on a first-come-first-served basis, so there is no need for auctions and domains are registered as claims are made during the sunrise period. This type of sunrise has so far been very rare among New gTLD strings, and has benefits for registries while causing concerns for rights holders.

== Sunrise domain name registration ==
Trademark holders have first right to register their trademarked terms. Every new gTLD is required to organize a sunrise period of at least 30 days before domain names are offered to the general public. If a company/business or an individual is interested in protecting their brand in the New gTLD era, they should register as trademark holder or trademark agent with Trademark Clearinghouse (TMCH). On successful registration, they may submit their trademark records and be eligible for trademark claims notification and/or sunrise services. A brand owner should be aware of the launch of new TLDs to educate themselves on the different tactics i.e. defensive registrations, monitoring, blocking or creating a new strategy; registering a mark in the TMCH is the first step.

== Trademark claims services ==
The trademark claims service follows the sunrise. It is a notification service—mandated by ICANN for all new gTLDs—to warn both domain name registrants as well as trademark holders of possible infringements. If multiple trademark-holders place a request for the same domain name, the registry may put the domain name to an auction, where the highest bidder gets to register the name. A sunrise registration request is essential to take part in the auction.

== Sunrise auction ==
When two trademark owners both have legitimate claim to a given domain, these domains then go to auction.
