= GRS Domains =

Gibraltarian domain registry service

GRS Domains Ltd.
- Type: Privately-held
- Industry: Domain registry
- Predecessor: Famous Four Media
- Headquarters: 327 Main Street, Gibraltar
- Owner: PwC Gibraltar
- Website: grs.domains

Global Registry Services Domains Ltd., doing business as GRS Domains, is a domain registry service provider based in Gibraltar. GRS Domains supports the gTLDs founded and majority owned by venture capitalist Iain Roache.

== History ==
GRS Domains succeeded Famous Four Media (FFM) after FFM withdrew services over unpaid outstanding invoices by Domain Venture Partners (DVP).

They bid for .shop, but lost to GMO Registry of Japan.

== gTLDs managed ==
GRS Domains operates the following sixteen gTLDs:

- .accountant
- .bid
- .cricket
- .date
- .download
- .faith
- .loan
- .men
- .party
- .racing
- .review
- .science
- .stream
- .trade
- .webcam
- .win

=== .science ===
Around 350,000 domains were originally registered under .science in 2016, but registrations dropped off sharply in 2017 and fell to around 14,000 in late 2019 as early registrations expired and were not renewed. A study carried out in 2020 found that there had been little uptake of the .science domain by academics and researchers, the originally intended community. Of the domains registered at this point, 39% did not return a website, 35% were parked for reselling, and another 10% were simply used as redirects. Only 16% appeared to be in use, and only a third to a half of those were actually used for an academic purpose.
