= .online =

Internet top-level domain

online
- Introduced: 26 August 2015
- TLD type: Generic top-level domain
- Status: Live
- Registry: Radix Registry
- Sponsor: None
- Registered domains: 3,987,173 (4 October 2025)
- Registration restrictions: None
- Registry website: http://get.online

.online is a generic top-level domain (gTLD) of the Domain Name System (DNS) used in the Internet.

== History ==
In 2012, ICANN announced it would be expanding the range of domain extensions to further organize the Internet with new TLD's being requested by multiple parties. Six companies including Radix, Tucows, Namecheap, I-Registry Ltd., WhatBox?, and Donuts (Bitter Frostbite, LLC) filed applications for this TLD.

The .online TLD was launched in August 2015. It is currently owned and operated by Radix, founded by Bhavin Turakhia. Initially, it was a joint venture between Radix, Tucows, and Namecheap after they won the rights to .online in a private auction in 2014. Radix bought out full rights from Namecheap and Tucows to become the exclusive owner of the TLD in 2015.

The TLD was the first to register over 38,000 domains in the first 24 hours, making it the largest new gTLD launch of its time. In November 2015, .online became the fastest new gTLD to exceed 100,000 registrations and, as of 2018, surpassed one million registrations from over 230 countries, making it the fifth largest nTLD by zone size. Based on an internal analysis by Radix, 65% of developed .online domains are in use by SMBs, while the company had generated over $13M in total revenue from the gTLD as of May 2020.

== Usage ==
This gTLD is used by an array of websites. In 2017, Casino.online sold for $201,250 to become the largest new gTLD sale of its time.
