= .jobs =

Internet top-level domain for employers

- Registry logo
- Introduced: 2005
- TLD type: Sponsored top-level domain
- Status: Active
- Registry: Employ Media LLC
- Sponsor: The Society for Human Resource Management
- Intended use: For companies and organizations to post their job listings
- Registration restrictions: Registrations must be based on legal name of company or organization and should be made by people within the company responsible for human resource management
- Structure: Direct second-level registrations are allowed
- Documents: ICANN New sTLD RFP Application; ICANN Sponsorship Agreement
- Dispute policies: UDRP
- Registry website: secure.jobs

.jobs is a sponsored top-level domain (sTLD) in the Domain Name System of the Internet. As indicated by its name, the domain is restricted to employment-related sites.

The domain was approved by ICANN on April 8, 2005, as part of the second group of new TLD applications submitted in 2004. It was installed in the DNS root in September 2005, and began accepting registrations later in the year.

== Intended use ==
The intended use of the domain jobs is for companies and organizations to register some version of their corporate names and use it for a site aimed at those seeking employment with that company, or, .jobs can target a specific market. For example, manufacturing.jobs could represent employment for a specific corporation, or market sector.

In 2010, Employ Media LLC applied to ICANN to extend the charter under which Employ Media is authorized to sell the .jobs domains. If accepted, Employ Media plans to create hundreds of thousands and perhaps a million new, niche job boards and sell domains such as Chicago.jobs to third parties. The International Association of Employment Web Sites and dozens of other employment services organizations have objected.

It has been suggested that subdomains of other domains, such as jobs.example.com, can be used without any new registrations on the part of the companies involved. However, there is no general consensus among companies or industry sectors for any such naming scheme, like there is for the www prefix and other prefixes, so the proponents of .jobs argue the domain can gain a market presence by allowing recruiters to communicate a simple, direct URL destination of employment opportunities to job seekers.

In 2013, Employ Media partnered with Cnjobs Technology which is headed by Dr. Renjun Bao to expand to greater China.
