= .mil =

Internet top-level domain

- Introduced: January 1, 1985; 41 years ago
- TLD type: Sponsored top-level domain
- Status: Active
- Registry: Defense Information Systems Agency
- Sponsor: DoD Network Information Center
- Intended use: Military entities
- Actual use: Agencies, services and divisions of the United States Department of Defense
- Registration restrictions: Restricted to eligible agencies
- Structure: Divisions of particular services usually have third and higher level subdomains, such as within army.mil for United States Army sites.
- Documents: RFC 920; RFC 1591
- Dispute policies: None
- DNSSEC: Yes
- Registry website: www.war.gov/Resources/Register-a-Site/tab/Website/

The domain name mil is the sponsored top-level domain (sTLD) in the Domain Name System of the Internet for the United States Department of Defense and its subsidiary or affiliated organizations. The name is derived from military. It was one of the first top-level domains, created in January 1985. As in the case with .gov, the United States is the only country that has a top-level domain for its military, a direct result of the United States' military's role in the creation of the Internet.

Other countries often use second-level domains for this purpose, e.g., mod.uk for the United Kingdom's Ministry of Defence.

Despite having a dedicated top-level domain, the US military also uses com domains for some of its recruitment sites, such as goarmy.com, as well as for the Defense Commissary Agency's website www.commissaries.com and most non-appropriated fund instrumentalities such as military MWR organizations and military exchanges. Also, the military uses edu domains for its service academies: the United States Military Academy, United States Coast Guard Academy, United States Naval Academy, and the United States Air Force Academy can all be reached using either an edu or a mil domain name. The official athletic program sites of the three academies that are members of NCAA Division I (Army, Navy, Air Force) use com domains, as well as Coast Guard, which is a member of NCAA Division III. The United States Department of Defense (also referred to as the Department of War) itself uses gov for its home page, with at least three second-level domains within mil (defense, dod, pentagon) redirecting to its domain name war.gov (formerly dod.gov).

The United States Coast Guard, like other military services, uses the mil domain, although during statutory peacetime the service falls under the United States Department of Homeland Security.

The mil domain is also used by NORAD, a bi-national military alliance between the US and Canada.
