= List of English-language generic internet top-level domains =

This list of English-language generic internet top-level domains (TLD) contains generic top-level domains, which are those domains in the DNS root zone of the Domain Name System of the internet. A list of the top-level domains by the Internet Assigned Numbers Authority (IANA) is maintained at the Root Zone Database.

- Name: DNS name
- Target market: intended use
- Restrictions: restrictions, if any, on who can register, and how the domain can be used
- Operator: entity the registry has been delegated to
- IDN: support for internationalized domain names (IDN)
- DNSSEC: presence of DS records for Domain Name System Security Extensions

== List ==
Name	Target market	Restrictions	Operator/Registry	IDN	DNSSEC
.academy	Schools, military academies, online learning websites, PTAs and student portals, or any site created to be educational on a particular topic.	—	Identity Digital (Note: Operating as Binky Moon, LLC, a shell company subsidiary of Identity Digital and formerly Donuts Inc)	Yes	Yes
.accountant	Certified Public Accountants, tax advisors, corporate accountants, personal and business accountants, and professional CPA organizations.	—	Global Registry Services Ltd	Unknown	Yes
.accountants	Accountants and accounting firms.	—	Identity Digital	Yes	Yes
.anime	For sites hosting anime	Anime Sites Inc.	The Anime Sites	Unknown	
.actor	Aspiring actors and their agents, theaters and movie studios, entertainment outlets, streaming video sites, movie review sites, and celebrity gossip sites.	—	Identity Digital (Note: Operating as Dog Beach, LLC, a shell company subsidiary of Identity Digital)	Yes	Yes
.ads	advertising	Reserved for Google AdSense.	Charleston Road Registry Inc. (Google)		Yes
.adult	Sites providing sexually explicit content, such as pornography.	—	ICM Registry	Yes	Yes
.aero	Air-transport industry.	Must verify eligibility for registration; only those in various categories of air-travel-related entities may register.	SITA	No	Yes
.africa	African and pan-African topics, African Union	—	ZA Central Registry	Unknown	Yes
.agency	Marketing and advertising agencies, PR or communications agencies, design firms, talent agencies, travel agencies, and other related agencies.	—	Identity Digital	Yes	Yes
.airforce	Military recruiters, flight training schools, supply companies, military aircraft suppliers and repair companies, and Air Force members and veterans.	—	Identity Digital	Yes	Yes
.analytics		Reserved for SAS Institute.	Campus IP LLC		Yes
.apartments	Property (apartment) managers, condominium/apartment developers, college websites/centers, and city guides and community centers.	—	Identity Digital	Yes	Yes
.app	Apps.	—	Charleston Road Registry Inc. (Google) (Note: Operated by Charleston Road Registry, Inc., a subsidiary of Google. See Google Registry FAQs.)	Yes	Yes
.archi	architects and architect firms	Restricted to individuals and organizations that can verify participation in architecture industry.	STARTING DOT LIMITED	Unknown	Yes
.army	Military recruiter, army supply stores, military training schools, army members and veterans	—	Identity Digital	Yes	Yes
.art	artists, museums, art galleries, dealers, service providers and contractors	—	UK Creative Ideas	Yes	Yes
.associates	Accountants, law firms, consulting firms, real estate agencies, health & medical groups	—	Identity Digital	Yes	Yes
.attorney	Independent attorneys and law firms of any size, legal services entities, elected officials and judges, professional organizations, law students	—	Identity Digital	Yes	Yes
.auction	Auction houses & online auctions, car and truck auction, B2B commodity auctions, charity auctions for non-profits and schools, buyer and seller communities	—	Identity Digital	Yes	Yes
.audio	stereo/sound systems, music	—	Uniregistry	Yes	Yes
.author		—	Amazon Registry Services, Inc.		Yes
.auto	vehicles	—	XYZ.com		Yes
.autos	vehicles	—	XYZ.com	Unknown	Yes
.baby	For selling baby-related products	—	XYZ.com	Yes	Yes
.band	Music venues, ticket sale/resale sites, music band & musician sites, school band sites, music review sites	—	Identity Digital	Yes	Yes
.bank	banks	Restricted to banks and savings associations	fTLD Registry Services, LLC	Unknown	Yes
.bar	Bars and related industry	—	Punto 2012	Yes	Yes
.barefoot		Reserved for Gallo Vineyards Inc.	Gallo Vineyards, Inc.		Yes
.bargains	Online retailers, large and small, "sale" sections on retail websites, discount & overstock sites, bargain hunters, frugal-living bloggers	—	Identity Digital (Note: Operating as Half Hallow, LLC)	Yes	Yes
.baseball	baseball	Reserved for MLB	MLB Advanced Media DH, LLC		Yes
.beauty	beauty	—	XYZ.com	Yes	Yes
.beer	breweries and beer aficionados	—	Minds + Machines (Note: A subsidiary of Minds + Machines Group (formerly Top Level Domain Holdings.))	Unknown	Yes
.best	those who are interested in the best	—	BestTLD Pty Ltd	Unknown	Yes
.bet	gambling	—	Identity Digital plc	Yes	Yes
.bible		—	American Bible Society	Yes	Yes
.bid	auctions	—	Global Registry Services Ltd	Yes	Yes
.bike	Bicycle & motorcycle enthusiasts, bike retailers & gear shops, bike repair shops, biking event organizers, bike or motorcycle clubs	—	Identity Digital (Note: Operating as Grand Hollow, LLC)	Yes	Yes
.bingo	Bingo halls, casinos, online & casual gaming sites, travel agencies	—	Identity Digital	Yes	Yes
.bio	Organic agriculture	Open TLD; any person or entity is permitted to register; however, registrants who are "producers, transformers and retailers, or otherwise involved in the field of agriculture, food and farming" must comply with the Principles of Organic Agriculture.	Identity Digital	Unknown	Yes
.biz	business	Open TLD; any person or entity is permitted to register; however, registrations may be challenged later if they are not held by commercial entities in accordance with the domain's charter. This TLD was created to provide relief for the .com TLD, where many names have already been taken.	NeuStar	Yes	Yes
.black	those who like the color black	—	Identity Digital	Yes	Yes
.blackfriday	Black Friday, retail	—	Uniregistry	Yes	Yes
.blockbuster		Reserved for Blockbuster LLC	Dish DBS Corporation		Yes
.blog	blogs	—	Automattic		Yes
.blue		—	Identity Digital	Yes	Yes
.boo	—	—	Charleston Road Registry Inc. (Google)	Yes	Yes
.book		—	Amazon Registry Services, Inc.		Yes
.boston	websites related to the city of Boston, Massachusetts USA	—	Boston TLD Management, LLC	Unknown	Yes
.bot		Previously restricted to online "bots" using approved frameworks (Amazon Lex, Dialogflow, Gupshup, Microsoft Bot Framework, and Pandorabots) and now has no restrictions.	Amazon Registry Services, Inc.		Yes
.boutique	Specialty online retailers, vintage shops, designers, artists and artisans, craftspeople	—	Identity Digital (Note: Operating as Over Galley, LLC)	Yes	Yes
.box	individuals and businesses, in order to promote personal cloud storage	—	NS1 Limited	Yes	Yes
.broadway	Broadway theatre	Reserved for members of the Broadway League	Celebrate Broadway, Inc.		Yes
.broker		—	Identity Digital		Yes
.build	construction industry	—	Plan Bee LLC	Yes	Yes
.builders	Contractors, subcontractors, commercial/residential architects, interior designers	—	Identity Digital (Note: Operating as Atomic Madison, LLC)	Yes	Yes
.business	Creative businesses & agencies, freelancers & independent consultants, any other business looking to differentiate from the competition	—	Identity Digital (Note: Operating as Spring Cross, LLC)	Yes	Yes
.buy	sales	—	Amazon Registry Services, INC		Yes
.buzz	marketing and social networking	—	DOTSTRATEGY	Yes	Yes
.cab	Airline & travel-related products or services, city guides & tourist attractions, transportation businesses, hotels, hostels, B&Bs, lodging, tourist attractions	—	Identity Digital (Note: Operating as Half Sunset, LLC)	Yes	Yes
.cafe	Cafes, restaurants, delis, cafeterias, coffee shops & coffee stands, student lounges, mobile food/beverage vendors, cooking schools	—	Identity Digital	Yes	Yes
.call		—	Amazon Registry Services, Inc.		Yes
.cam	Cameras, photography, broadcasting, film-making and livestreaming.	—	CAM Connecting SarL	Yes	Yes
.camera	Professional photographers, camera and equipment retailers, photo studios & photography schools, wedding and specialty photographers, anyone who wants to share photos online	—	Identity Digital (Note: Operating as Atomic Maple, LLC)	Yes	Yes
.camp	Camping/RV sites, travel writers & bloggers, outdoor adventure companies, summer camps for kids, hotels, hostels, lodges, bed & breakfast lodging	—	Identity Digital (Note: Operating as Delta Dynamite, LLC)	Yes	Yes
.capital	Mortgage companies, financial services professionals, investment services, venture capital investors	—	Identity Digital (Note: Operating as Delta Mill, LLC)	Yes	Yes
.car	vehicles	—	XYZ.COM LLC		Yes
.cards	Occasion shoppers (holiday, birthday, bereavement), occasion-related websites, gift buyers, corporate HR departments	—	Identity Digital (Note: Operating as Foggy Hollow, LLC)	Yes	Yes
.care	Surgeons, primary/secondary care physicians, insurance providers, hospitals & clinics, medical, dental, or vision specialists, service based products or services	—	Identity Digital (Note: Operating as Goose Cross, LLC)	Yes	Yes
.career	jobs and job-searching	—	dotCareer LLC	Yes	Yes
.careers	Career services (coaching, resume writing), job sites & recruiters, business coaches, staffing firms, HR department of any business	—	Identity Digital (Note: Operating as Wild Corner, LLC)	Yes	Yes
.cars	Automotive	—	Uniregistry	Yes	Yes
.casa	Spanish word for house, targeted for real estate and other house and home related companies	—	Minds + Machines Group Limited		
.case		Reserved for CNH Industrial	CNH Industrial N.V.		Yes
.cash	Pawn shops and consignment shops, currency exchanges, other cash-based businesses, check cashing services	—	Identity Digital (Note: Operating as Delta Lake, LLC)	Yes	Yes
.casino	Casino & online gaming sites, travel agencies, local tourist sites, hotel booking sites	—	Identity Digital	Yes	Yes
.catering	Caterers & personal chefs, specialty food vendors, wedding planners & event planners, event spaces, wholesale suppliers	—	Identity Digital (Note: Operating as New Falls, LLC)	Yes	Yes
.catholic	Catholicism	—	Dicastery for Communication		Yes
.center	Community centers, business centers, shopping centers, tourist sites/city centers, tutoring & learning centers	—	Identity Digital (Note: Operating as Tin Mill, LLC)	Yes	Yes
.cern	CERN	CERN	CERN	Unknown	Yes
.ceo	CEOs	—	CEOTLD Pty Ltd	Unknown	Yes
.cfd	clothing fashion design	—	ShortDot SA		Yes
.channel		—	Charleston Road Registry Inc. (Google)	Yes	Yes
.chat	Online chat rooms, dating, political, religious, sports, human interest, & hobbyist forums, companies with live chat help desks, chatbot technology companies	—	Identity Digital	Yes	Yes
.charity		—	Public Interest Registry	Yes	Yes
.cheap	Online retailers, discount sites, overstock sites, businesses who sell bulk products at discounted prices, bargain hunters & frugal-living bloggers	—	Identity Digital (Note: Operating as Sand Cover, LLC)	Yes	Yes
.christmas	Christmas	—	Uniregistry	Yes	Yes
.church	Churches, youth organizations, spiritual communities, religion-based organizations, anyone who publishes spiritual or religious content	—	Identity Digital (Note: Operating as Holly Fields, LLC)	Yes	Yes
.circle		—	Amazon Registry Services, Inc.		Yes
.city	City resource sites for locals and travelers, travel writers & bloggers, local reviews websites, tourist attractions, transportation businesses	—	Identity Digital (Note: Operating as Snow Sky, LLC)	Yes	Yes
.claims	Insurance adjusters & claims representatives, insurance claims departments (auto, medical, homeowners), customer service departments of insurance companies, law firms	—	Identity Digital (Note: Operating as Black Corner, LLC)	Yes	Yes
.cleaning	Contractors, commercial/home cleaning services, auto detailing/cleaning services	—	Identity Digital (Note: Operating as Fox Shadow, LLC)	Yes	Yes
.click		—	Uniregistry	Yes	Yes
.clinic	Healthcare clinics, medical or healthcare specialists, sports clinics, urgent care clinics	—	Identity Digital (Note: Operating as Goose Park, LLC)	Yes	Yes
.clothing	Online retailers, department stores, designers	—	Identity Digital (Note: Operating as Steel Lake, LLC)	Yes	Yes
.cloud	Companies involved in cloud computing	—	Aruba S.p.A.		Yes
.club	groups, organizations, assemblies, communities, general	—	.CLUB DOMAINS	Yes	Yes
.coach	Athletic organizations, personal trainers & coaches, business, life, & health coaches, school & community club coaches or tutors, affordable travel, airline, train, car, or other transportation companies	—	Identity Digital	Yes	Yes
.codes	Software and web developers, IT companies, technology R&D companies, coding enthusiasts, coding classes & camps	—	Identity Digital (Note: Operating as Puff Willow, LLC)	Yes	Yes
.coffee	Coffee shops, roasters, wholesalers & suppliers, machine & equipment suppliers and stands	—	Identity Digital (Note: Operating as Trixy Cover, LLC)	Yes	Yes
.college	Educational	—	XYZ.com	Yes	Yes
.community	City guides & community centers, online communities, neighborhood associations, churches, mosques, temples, and other spiritual communities, local writers & bloggers	—	Identity Digital (Note: Operating as Fox Orchard, LLC)	Yes	Yes
.company	Small, medium, or large businesses, business that want to demonstrate authority in their field, makers, artisans, anyone who sells a niche product	—	Identity Digital (Note: Operating as Silver Avenue, LLC)	Yes	Yes
.compare			GoDaddy Registry		Yes
.computer	Computer manufacturers, computer repair services, computer resellers, computer training & education programs, tech companies	—	Identity Digital (Note: Operating as Pine Mill, LLC)	Yes	Yes
.condos	Real estate brokers/agents, property (condominium) managers, mortgage companies, condominium/apartment developers, condominium associations	—	Identity Digital (Note: Operating as Pine House, LLC)	Yes	Yes
.construction	Contractors, commercial/residential architects, wholesale and retail construction suppliers	—	Identity Digital (Note: Operating as Fox Dynamite, LLC)	Yes	Yes
.consulting	Consulting firms, independent consultants, specialty services, businesses that offer expert training	—	Identity Digital	Yes	Yes
.contact		—	Identity Digital		Yes
.contractors	Construction-related businesses, contractors, subcontractors, independent contractors with unique skills and expertise, unions or other organizations promoting their people and skills	—	Identity Digital (Note: Operating as Magic Woods, LLC)	Yes	Yes
.cooking	sharing recipes	—	Minds + Machines	Yes	Yes
.cool	Fashion magazines & blogs, meme aggregators, trend tracking sites, online merchants, fun publications & sites	—	Identity Digital (Note: Operating as Koko Lake, LLC)	Yes	Yes
.coop	cooperatives	The .coop TLD is limited to cooperatives as defined by the Rochdale Principles.	DotCooperation	No	Yes
.country	general	—	Minds + Machines	Yes	Yes
.coupon	discounts and rebates	—	Amazon Registry Services, Inc.		Yes
.coupons	Coupon pages, coupon sites, discount sites, coupon-themed blogs, bargain hunters	—	Identity Digital	Yes	Yes
.courses	education	—	Open Universities Australia Pty Ltd		Yes
.cpa	accountants and accounting firms	Restricted to licensed CPAs and CPA firms	American Institute of Certified Public Accountants	Unknown	Yes
.credit	Credit card companies, lenders, credit unions, collection agencies, credit counselors & financial planners	—	Identity Digital (Note: Operating as Snow Shadow, LLC)	Yes	Yes
.creditcard	Credit card companies, store/retailer credit card sites, credit counselors & financial planners, credit card processing services	—	Identity Digital (Note: Operating as Binky Frostbite, LLC)	Yes	Yes
.cruise	Cruise lines, cruise-related products or services, travel agencies & vacation services, private charter boats	—	Viking River Cruises (Bermuda) Ltd.		Yes
.cricket	cricket	—	Global Registry Services Ltd	Unknown	Yes
.cruises	cruise businesses and travel	—	Identity Digital (Note: Operating as Spring Way, LLC)	Yes	Yes
.cyou	For any individual or business that shares the ethical values of diversity, inclusivity, and independence	—	Shortdot SA		Yes
.dad	fathers	—	Charleston Road Registry Inc. (Google)	Unknown	Yes
.dance	Dance studios & instructors, nightclubs & music venues, dance teams & troupes, dance shoe, clothing & equipment manufacturers, fans of dance & live performances	—	Identity Digital	Yes	Yes
.data		—	Dish DBS Corporation		Yes
.date	online dating	—	Global Registry Services Ltd	Unknown	Yes
.dating	Dating & matchmaker sites, travel sites & city guides, singles meetup groups, traditional “classified” sites, event businesses	—	Identity Digital (Note: Operating as Pine Fest, LLC)	Yes	Yes
.day	general	—	Charleston Road Registry Inc. (Google)	Unknown	Yes
.deal	sales	—	Amazon Registry Services, Inc.		Yes
.deals	Discount sites, bargain hunters, coupon sites, coupon pages. coupon-themed guides, directories and blogs	—	Identity Digital (Note: Operating as Sand Sunset, LLC)	Yes	Yes
.degree	Brick-and-mortar schools & universities, online universities, other learning courses, other educational resources	—	Identity Digital	Yes	Yes
.delivery	Consumer delivery services, commercial shipping services, transportation services, messenger services, any business that ships their products	—	Identity Digital (Note: Operating as Steel Station, LLC)	Yes	Yes
.democrat	Political candidates, lobbyists, political parties, fundraising organizations	—	Identity Digital	Yes	Yes
.dental	Dentists, endodontists, orthodontists, retailers selling oral health supplies, wholesale suppliers for dental care	—	Identity Digital (Note: Operating as Tin Birch, LLC)	Yes	Yes
.dentist	Dentists, endodontists, orthodontists, retailers selling oral health supplies, wholesale suppliers for dental care	—	Identity Digital	Yes	Yes
.design	graphic art and fashion	—	GoDaddy Registry	Yes	Yes
.dev	software development	—	Charleston Road Registry Inc. (Google)	Unknown	Yes
.diamonds	Jewelers, diamond wholesalers and retailers, jewelry appraisers and buyers, pawn shops	—	Identity Digital (Note: Operating as John Edge, LLC)	Yes	Yes
.diet	dieting and dietary	—	Uniregistry	Yes	Yes
.digital	Advertising/Marketing/PR/Design agencies, media buying/production companies (digital & traditional), online event, meetup & gaming sites, technology companies, e-commerce sites	—	Identity Digital (Note: Operating as Dash Park, LLC)	Yes	Yes
.direct	Direct-to-consumer stores, bargain hunters, transportation services, messenger services, delivery & shipping services	—	Identity Digital (Note: Operating as Half Trail, LLC)	Yes	Yes
.directory	Listings organizations, name, phone & address directories, online business directories, clubs, groups, & other organizations directories	—	Identity Digital (Note: Operating as Extra Madison, LLC)	Yes	Yes
.discount	Discount sites, bargain hunters, coupon sites, coupon pages, coupon-themed blogs	—	Identity Digital (Note: Operating as Holly Hill, LLC)	Yes	Yes
.diy	do-it-yourself	—	Lifestyle Domain Holdings, Inc.		Yes
.docs	Technical Documentation	—	Charleston Road Registry Inc. (Google)		Yes
.doctor	Doctors, any business with “doctor” in the name, other health care providers, PhD experts in any field	—	Identity Digital	Yes	Yes
.dog	Dog breeders, dog walking, grooming & sitting businesses, veterinarians, animal shelters & adoption centers, pet stores & suppliers	—	Identity Digital	Yes	Yes
.domains	Any web-based service, network consultants, domain brokers, resellers and registrars, home-related products and services	—	Identity Digital (Note: Operating as Sugar Cross, LLC)	Yes	Yes
.dot		—	Dish DBS Corporation		Yes
.download	technology	—	Global Registry Services Ltd	Unknown	Yes
.drive		Reserved for Google Drive	Charleston Road Registry Inc. (Google)		Yes
.earth	Individuals or businesses with a worldwide focus	—	Interlink Co., Ltd.		Yes
.eat	restaurants and foodies	—	Charleston Road Registry Inc. (Google)	Unknown	Yes
.eco	Sustainability minded companies, non-profits and professionals.	Open to anyone pledging a commitment to sustainability action.	Big Room Inc.	No	Yes
.education	Colleges & universities, public schools, PTAs & other school groups, education research organizations, any organization focused on educating its audience	—	Identity Digital (Note: Operating as Brice Way, LLC)	Yes	Yes
.email	Advertising/Marketing/PR/Design agencies, email marketing experts, CRM and marketing technology specialists, anyone who wants a memorable email address	—	Identity Digital (Note: Operating as Spring Madison, LLC)	Yes	Yes
.energy	Electrical, mechanical, chemical, nuclear & thermal energy producers, solar, wind, hydro, bio & other sustainable alternative energy producers, battery manufacturers & oil industry R&D, energy conservation organizations, energy food & drink manufacturers	—	Identity Digital (Note: Operating as Binky Birch, LLC)	Yes	Yes
.engineer	Computer and software engineering companies, civil, electrical, mechanical, and architectural engineering companies, environmental, chemical, geotechnical, and bio engineering companies, engineer training or educational institutions, railroad engineers	—	Identity Digital	Yes	Yes
.engineering	Computer and software engineering companies, civil, electrical, mechanical, and architectural engineering companies, environmental, chemical, geotechnical, and bio engineering companies, engineer training or educational institutions, railroad engineers	—	Identity Digital (Note: Operating as Romeo Canyon.)	Yes	Yes
.edeka	edeka firms	—	EDEKA Verband kaufmännischer Genossenschaften e.V.	Yes	Yes
.entertainment	Ticket outlets, travel sites & local tourist sites, performance halls, theaters, & music venues, anyone in the entertainment industry, celebrity news sites	—	Identity Digital	Yes	
.enterprises	Entrepreneurs, startups, parent & holding companies, enterprise SaaS solutions & tech services	—	Identity Digital (Note: Operating as Snow Oaks, LLC)	Yes	Yes
.equipment	Home improvement stores, construction equipment rentals, construction equipment sales, sporting goods stores	—	Identity Digital (Note: Operating as Corn Station, LLC)	Yes	Yes
.esq	lawyers, law firms, legal professionals	To be restricted to verified lawyers and attorneys	Charleston Road Registry Inc. (Google)	Unknown	Yes
.estate	Estate sale management & appraisal services, estate planners & lawyers, real estate agents & brokers	—	Identity Digital (Note: Operating as Trixy Park, LLC)	Yes	Yes
.events	Event planners, sports & gaming agencies/sites, ticket sale/resale sites, city guides & community centers, performance halls, music clubs/bars	—	Identity Digital (Note: Operating as Pioneer Maple, LLC)	Yes	Yes
.exchange	Foreign currency exchanges, stock brokers, investment fund traders, ETF distributors, brokers, & dealers	—	Identity Digital (Note: Operating as Spring Falls, LLC)	Yes	Yes
.expert	Home services providers, online review sites, skilled worker databases, freelancers, consultants, & subject matter experts	—	Identity Digital (Note: Operating as Magic Pass, LLC)	Yes	Yes
.exposed	Tabloid sites, celebrity romance blog, TV spoiler sites, sites that host leaked documents, investigative journalism sites	—	Identity Digital (Note: Operating as Victor Beach, LLC)	Yes	Yes
.express	Transportation services, messenger services, delivery & shipping services, direct-to-consumer stores	—	Identity Digital	Yes	Yes
.fail	Online meme aggregators, humor websites, video sites	—	Identity Digital (Note: Operating as Atomic Pipe, LLC)	Yes	Yes
.faith	religion and churches	—	Global Registry Services Ltd	Unknown	Yes
.family	Family-focused travel sites, blogs about family-friendly activities & games, family history sites, photo sites, obstetricians & family practice doctors	—	Identity Digital	Yes	Yes
.fan	Fan sites, current events & gossip sites, sport blogs and forums, personal & business sites about niche topics	—	Identity Digital	Yes	Yes
.fans	general	—	ZDNS International Limited	Unknown	Yes
.farm	Real estate brokers/agents, farming services & equipment dealers, farmers & ranchers, property managers, health food distributors, cryptocurrency farmers	—	Identity Digital (Note: Operating as Just Maple, LLC)	Yes	Yes
.fashion	clothing industry	—	Minds + Machines	Yes	Yes
.fast		Reserved for Amazon	Amazon Registry Services, Inc.		Yes
.feedback	feedback and reviews	—	Top Level Spectrum	Unknown	Yes
.film	films	—	Motion Picture Domain Registry Pty Ltd		Yes
.final	final versions of anything	—	Núcleo de Informação e Coordenação do Ponto BR - NIC.br		Yes
.finance	Investment services, banks & financial institutes, credit counselors & financial planners, accounting firms, lenders	—	Identity Digital (Note: Operating as Cotton Cypress, LLC)	Yes	Yes
.financial	Investment services, banks & financial institutions, credit counselors & financial planners, accounting firms, lenders	—	Identity Digital (Note: Operating as Just Cover, LLC)	Yes	Yes
.fire		Reserved for Amazon (promotion of Fire devices)	Amazon Registry Services, Inc.		Yes
.fish	Seafood markets, restaurants & suppliers, sport fishing & fly fishing enthusiasts, fishing gear, tackle, & product manufacturers, travel outfitters & fishing guide companies, aquariums, pet & fish supply stores, marine biology programs & conservation organizations	—	Identity Digital (Note: Operating as Fox Woods, LLC)	Yes	Yes
.fishing	fishing businesses, sports, and interests	—	Minds + Machines	Yes	Yes
.fit	Fitness and exercise	—	Minds + Machines	Unknown	Yes
.fitness	Gyms, athletic clubs & family health organizations, personal trainers, weight loss, health & wellness clinics, health & exercise blogs, fitness competition & events companies	—	Identity Digital (Note: Operating as Brice Orchard, LLC)	Yes	Yes
.flights	Airline-related products or services, helicopter rides, skydiving, & hang gliding, travel agencies & travel services, private pilots, airport transportation	—	Identity Digital (Note: Operating as Fox Station, LLC)	Yes	Yes
.florist	Florists, flower delivery services, floral designers, flower seed suppliers	—	Identity Digital (Note: Operating as Half Cypress, LLC)	Yes	Yes
.flowers	florists and gardens	—	Uniregistry	Yes	Yes
.fly	travel	To be restricted to verified airlines, travel agencies and travel resellers	Charleston Road Registry Inc. (Google)	Unknown	Yes
.foo	programming and development	—	Charleston Road Registry Inc. (Google)	Yes	Yes
.food		—	Lifestyle Domain Holdings, Inc.		Yes
.foodnetwork		Reserved for Food Network	Lifestyle Domain Holdings, Inc.		
.football	Professional & amateur football & soccer teams, football clothing, gear & fan merchandise, football equipment manufacturers, football coaches & players	—	Identity Digital	Yes	Yes
.forex		—	Identity Digital		Yes
.forsale	Individual real estate brokers and brokerages, wholesalers and retailers across many product categories, discount, flash sale and deal websites, auction sites and individuals selling items they no longer need	—	Identity Digital	Yes	Yes
.forum	forums	—	Fegistry, LLC	Arabic	Yes
.foundation	Charitable organizations, public school foundations, other philanthropic organizations & foundations	—	Public Interest Registry	Yes	Yes
.free	sales	—	Amazon Registry Services, Inc.		Yes
.frontdoor		Reserved for HGTV	Lifestyle Domain Holdings, Inc.		
.fun		—	Radix Registry	Yes	Yes
.fund	Investment services, banks & financial institutions, credit counselors & financial planners, lenders	—	Identity Digital (Note: Operating as John Castle, LLC)	Yes	Yes
.furniture	Home décor and furnishing stores, department stores, home designers, vintage stores, antique dealers	—	Identity Digital (Note: Operating as Lone Fields, LLC)	Yes	Yes
.fyi	"for your information"	—	Identity Digital	Yes	Yes
.gallery	Galleries, professional photographers, camera and equipment retailers, photo studios & photography schools, wedding and specialty photographers, anyone who wants to share photos online	—	Identity Digital (Note: Operating as Sugar House, LLC)	Yes	Yes
.game	gaming	—	XYZ.COM LLC	Yes	Yes
.games	Gaming sites, forums & reviews, online or brick & mortar game stores/clubs, sports events, clubs—professional & recreational, casinos	—	Identity Digital	Yes	Yes
.garden	gardening	—	Minds + Machines	Yes	Yes
.gay	Individuals in the LGBTQ community and/ or supportive organisations and people	—	GoDaddy Registry	Yes	Yes
.gdn	general	—	GDN Registry	Yes	Yes
.gift	gift-giving	—	Uniregistry	Yes	Yes
.gifts	Gift buyers, discount sites, corporate HR departments, bargain hunters	—	Identity Digital (Note: Operating as Goose Sky, LLC)	Yes	Yes
.gives	Philanthropic organizations and foundations, charities, nonprofits, corporate giving initiatives, volunteer organizations	—	Public Interest Registry	Yes	Yes
.glass	Glass & glass repair shops, glass departments within home supply stores, contractors, windshield repair & auto glass businesses, DIYers/artists	—	Identity Digital (Note: Operating as Black Cover, LLC)	Yes	Yes
.gle	Google abbreviations	In use for some URL abbreviations related to Google such as forms.gle and goo.gle.	Charleston Road Registry Inc. (Google)	Unknown	Yes
.global	general, companies or individuals with a global focus or presence	—	Dot GLOBAL	Yes	Yes
.gmbh	German limited liability companies	—	Binky Moon, LLC		Yes
.gold	Jewelers, gold traders and dealers, coin sellers and traders, trophy and awards shops	—	Identity Digital	Yes	Yes
.golf	Professional & amateur golf organizations, golf courses, equipment suppliers & manufacturers, golf travel & event companies, golf players, enthusiasts & spectators, sports networks	—	Identity Digital	Yes	Yes
.google	Google	In use for some websites related to Google such as blog.google.	Charleston Road Registry Inc. (Google)	Unknown	Yes
.gop	Republican Party politics	—	Republican State Leadership Committee	Spanish	Yes
.graphics	Web design firms, freelance designers, graphic artists	—	Identity Digital (Note: Operating as Over Madison, LLC)	Yes	Yes
.green	the environmentally-focused	"As a Registrant you may not ... use a .green name or its content in a way that negatively affects the mission, purpose of the .green TLD, or its brand."	Identity Digital	Unknown	Yes
.gripe	Online complaint sites, online forums, customer service providers, feedback sites, blogs about scams	—	Identity Digital (Note: Operating as Corn Sunset, LLC)	Yes	Yes
.grocery		Reserved for Walmart	Wal-Mart Stores, Inc.		Yes
.group	Groups based on hobbies or interests (running, crafts, gaming), group-based businesses (medical practices, law firms, financial advisors), professional associations, support groups	—	Identity Digital	Yes	Yes
.guide	City resource sites for locals and travelers, travel writers & bloggers, local reviews websites, tourist attractions & guides, outdoor adventure companies	—	Identity Digital (Note: Operating as Snow Moon, LLC)	Yes	Yes
.guitars	Guitars	—	Uniregistry	Yes	Yes
.guru	Mindfulness & yoga practices, spiritual leadership sites, any training program, work-for-hire sites, freelancers, consultants, & subject matter experts	—	Identity Digital (Note: Operating as Pioneer Cypress, LLC)	Yes	Yes
.hair	haircare products and services	—	XYZ.com		Yes
.hangout		Reserved for Google Hangouts	Charleston Road Registry Inc. (Google)		Yes
.hamburg	Companies, organizations and private individuals with a connection to the Free and Hanseatic City of Hamburg	Unrestricted for inhabitants of Hamburg	Hamburg Top-Level-Domain GmbH		Yes
.health	health and related topics	—	Registry Services, LLC		Yes
.healthcare	Primary/secondary care physicians, hospitals & clinics, healthcare insurance providers & brokers, company HR/benefits departments	—	Identity Digital (Note: Operating as Silver Glen, LLC)	Yes	Yes
.help	help sites	—	Uniregistry	Yes	Yes
.here	generic geographic	—	Charleston Road Registry Inc. (Google)	Unknown	Yes
.hiphop	Hip hop culture	—	Dot Hip Hop, LLC	Yes	Yes
.hiv	AIDS and HIV awareness	—	dotHIV	Unknown	Yes
.hockey	Sports media, sporting goods stores & hockey equipment suppliers, professional, minor league & amateur hockey teams, hockey fans, fantasy leagues, sponsors, coaches & referees	—	Identity Digital	Yes	Yes
.holdings	Holding companies, private equity firms, real estate developers	—	Identity Digital (Note: Operating as John Madison, LLC)	Yes	Yes
.holiday	Airline-related products or services, travel agencies, resources & services, travel writers & bloggers, city guides & resource sites, hotels, hostels, B&Bs, lodging	—	Identity Digital (Note: Operating as Goose Woods, LLC)	Yes	Yes
.homes	real estate professionals	—	Dominion Enterprises	Unknown	Yes
.horse	horse-related businesses and interest	—	Minds + Machines	Yes	Yes
.hospital	Hospitals & clinics, healthcare providers, medical, dental, or vision specialists, insurance providers	—	Identity Digital	Yes	Yes
.host	network companies	—	Radix Registry	Unknown	Yes
.hosting		—	Uniregistry	Yes	Yes
.hot		—	Amazon Registry Services, Inc.		Yes
.hotels		Reserved for Booking.com	Booking.com B.V.		Yes
.house	Real estate brokers/agents, mortgage companies, home builders, construction/home improvement suppliers, home improvement sites & blogs	—	Identity Digital (Note: Operating as Sugar Park, LLC)	Yes	Yes
.how	how-to guides	—	Charleston Road Registry Inc. (Google)	Unknown	Yes
.icu	entrepreneurs and business owners	—	ShortDot SA		Yes
.inc	Corporations	—	Intercap Registry Inc.		Yes
.industries	Machine or equipment manufacturers, manufacturers, tech or biotech companies, professional associations, businesses with “industries” in their names	—	Identity Digital (Note: Operating as Outer House, LLC)	Yes	Yes
.info	information	—	Identity Digital	German	Yes
.ing	Verbal suffix: e.g., "jump.ing"	—	Charleston Road Registry Inc. (Google)	Unknown	Yes
.ink	creative printing or tattooing	—	GoDaddy Registry	Yes	Yes
.institute	Educational institutions, training programs, foundations, research organizations, military schools	—	Identity Digital (Note: Operating as Outer Maple, LLC)	Yes	Yes
.insurance	insurance companies	—	fTLD Registry Services LLC		Yes
.insure	Insurance companies (life, auto, homeowners, renters), insurance divisions of larger companies (car rentals, warranties), insurance brokers & advisors	—	Identity Digital (Note: Operating as Pioneer Willow, LLC)	Yes	Yes
.international	Any organization with an international presence, international consultants, import/export businesses, international travel organizations	—	Identity Digital (Note: Operating as Wild Way, LLC)	Yes	Yes
.investments	Investment services (institutional, private), wealth management services, financial planners, brokerage firms	—	Identity Digital (Note: Operating as Holly Glen, LLC)	Yes	Yes
.irish	Airline-related products or services, domestic/International travel agencies, resources & services, travel writers & bloggers, Ireland travel guides & resource sites, seasonal opportunities (St. Patrick's Day)	—	Identity Digital	Yes	Yes
.jewelry	Jewelers, jewelry buyers, online retailers, department stores	—	Identity Digital	Yes	Yes
.jobs	Employment	For websites with job opportunities and job listings.	Employ Media	No	Yes
.joy		—	Amazon Registry Services, Inc.		Yes
.kim	Kim (Korean surname)	—	Identity Digital	Unknown	Yes
.kitchen	Restaurants, cafes, & delis, food stands & mobile vendors, meal services & personal chefs, kitchen supply stores, food blogs & recipe sites	—	Identity Digital (Note: Operating as Just Goodbye, LLC)	Yes	Yes
.kosher	Kosher food certification and regulations	—	OK Kosher Certification		Yes
.kpn	Dutch Telecom Company	Only available to KPN.			Yes
.land	Real estate brokers and agents, residential/commercial land developers, home builders, mortgage companies, traditional “classified” sites	—	Identity Digital (Note: Operating as Pine Moon, LLC)	Yes	Yes
.lat	Latin American communities and users	—	ECOM-LAC		Yes
.law	practitioners and educators in law	Restricted to qualified lawyers, courts of law, law schools, and legal regulators.	Minds + Machines Group Limited		Yes
.lawyer	Independent attorneys and law firms of any size, legal services entities, elected officials and judges, professional organizations, law students	—	Identity Digital	Yes	Yes
.lease	Real estate brokers/agents, property managers, condo/apartment developers, real estate law firms	—	Identity Digital (Note: Operating as Victor Trail, LLC)	Yes	Yes
.legal	Attorneys, lawyers & law firms, corporate legal teams, paralegals, legal advocates, committees, associations and interest groups associated with the law	—	Identity Digital	Yes	Yes
.lgbt	the lesbian, gay, bisexual and transgender community	—	Identity Digital	Unknown	Yes
.life	Wellness and health experts, charities, coaches & personal development enthusiasts, lifestyle bloggers, anyone who wants to share personal stories	—	Identity Digital (Note: Operating as Trixy Oaks, LLC)	Yes	Yes
.lifeinsurance	life insurance	—	American Council of Life Insurers		Yes
.lighting	Lighting & lighting repair shops, lighting departments within home supply stores, contractors, commercial/residential architects, DIYers	—	Identity Digital (Note: Operating as John McCook, LLC)	Yes	Yes
.like		—	Amazon Registry Services, Inc.		Yes
.limited	Private companies, limited by shares, limited companies, businesses with “limited” or “LTD” in their names, specialty products and services, businesses that sell limited-quantity products	—	Identity Digital (Note: Operating as Big Fest, LLC)	Yes	Yes
.limo	Airline & travel-related products or services, city guides & tourist attractions, transportation businesses, hotels, lodging, weddings, party and occasion-related services	—	Identity Digital (Note: Operating as Hidden Frostbite, LLC)	Yes	Yes
.link	connecting to information	—	Uniregistry	Yes	Yes
.live	Live streaming sites, entertainment/music venues, news sites/blogs, ticket sale/resale sites, video production companies	—	Identity Digital	Yes	Yes
.living		—	Internet Naming Co.		Yes
.loan	banks and lenders	—	Global Registry Services Ltd	Unknown	Yes
.loans	Mortgage companies, personal loan agencies, auto loan agencies & car dealerships, credit consolidation services	—	Identity Digital (Note: Operating as June Woods, LLC)	Yes	Yes
.locker		Reserved for DISH DBS Corporation	Dish DBS Corporation		Yes
.lol	LOL: laughing out loud (humorous or comedic content)	—	Uniregistry	Unknown	Yes
.lotto	lottery	—	Identity Digital	Unknown	Yes
.love	dating sites	—		Unknown	Yes
.ltd	Private companies, limited by shares, limited companies, businesses with “limited” or “LTD” in their names, specialty products and services, businesses that sell limited-quantity products	—	Identity Digital	Yes	Yes
.luxury	businesses catering to the wealthy	—	Luxury Partners	Yes	Yes
.makeup		—	XYZ.com		Yes
.management	Property managers, wealth management firms, money management, systems & network managers, leadership teams	—	Identity Digital (Note: Operating as John Goodbye, LLC)	Yes	Yes
.map	maps and navigation	—	Charleston Road Registry Inc. (Google)	No	Yes
.market	Online retailers, independent or chain grocery stores, buyer and seller communities, discount sites & coupon sites	—	Identity Digital	Yes	Yes
.marketing	Advertising/Marketing/PR/Design agencies, media buying/production companies (digital & traditional), staffing agencies, marketing consultants	—	Identity Digital (Note: Operating as Fern Pass, LLC)	Yes	Yes
.markets		—	Identity Digital	Unknown	Yes
.mba	Colleges, universities, & graduate programs, online educational sites, job search sites, MBA candidates	—	Identity Digital	Yes	Yes
.med	medicine and related topics	—	Medistry LLC		Yes
.media	Advertising/Marketing/PR/Design agencies, media buying/production companies (digital & traditional), news outlets, media bloggers, celebrity publications, digital publishers & graphic designers	—	Identity Digital (Note: Operating as Grand Glen, LLC)	Yes	Yes
.meet	social gatherings, meeting new people	—	Identity Digital	Unknown	Yes
.meme	Internet memes	—	Charleston Road Registry Inc. (Google)	Unknown	Yes
.memorial	News site obituaries, personal tribute sites, floral & funeral arrangement companies	—	Identity Digital	Yes	Yes
.men	men	—	Global Registry Services Ltd	Unknown	Yes
.menu	restaurants	—	Wedding TLD2	Yes	Yes
.mobi	mobile devices	Must be used for mobile-compatible sites in accordance with standards.	Identity Digital	Yes	Yes
.mobile		—	Dish DBS Corporation		Yes
.moe	Japanese otaku culture; see moe (slang)	—	Interlink	Yes	Yes
.mom	mothers	—	Uniregistry, Corp.		Yes
.money	Lenders, financial services businesses, money blogs & news sites, investment bankers & brokers, financial planners & experts	—	Identity Digital	Yes	Yes
.monster		—	XYZ.com	Yes	Yes
.mortgage	Mortgage brokers, real estate brokers/agents, home buyers, traditional “classified” sites	—	Identity Digital	Yes	Yes
.motorcycles	motorcycles	—	DERMotorcycles	Unknown	Yes
.mov	digital video	—	Charleston Road Registry Inc. (Google)	Unknown	Yes
.movie	Streaming movie services, movie studios & distributors, movie theaters & entertainment outlets, ticket sale/resale sites, movie review sites	—	Identity Digital	Yes	Yes
.museum	museums	Must be verified as a legitimate museum.	Museum Domain Management Association	Latin script	Yes
.music	Music dissemination and appreciation	—	DotMusic Limited		Yes
.name	individuals, by name	Open TLD; any person or entity is permitted to register; however, registrations may be challenged later if they are not by individuals (or the owners of fictional characters) in accordance with the domain's charter.	Verisign	Yes	Yes
.navy	Naval training schools, navy supply stores, military recruiters, credit unions, navy members and veterans	—	Identity Digital	Yes	Yes
.network	IT professionals, tech consultants, career sites, industry-specific professional groups, social networks	—	Identity Digital (Note: Operating as Trixy Manor, LLC)	Yes	Yes
.new	Websites where people can create something	The second-level domain name must be the thing to be created immediately when a user visits the .new website. Most likely, the .new will redirect to a company's main website.	Charleston Road Registry Inc. (Google)	Unknown	Yes
.news	News organizations, educational publications, trade publications, neighborhood news blogs	—	Identity Digital	Unknown	Yes
.nexus		—	Charleston Road Registry Inc. (Google)	Unknown	Yes
.ngo	Non-governmental organizations.	Restricted to validated NGOs, as determined by PIR.	Public Interest Registry	Unknown	Yes
.ninja	Sites promoting specialized skills, repair services (auto, appliance, etc.), gaming sites, martial arts organizations	—	Identity Digital	Yes	Yes
.now		—	Amazon Registry Services, Inc.		Yes
.ntt		Restricted to use by NTT Japan.	Nippon Telegraph And Telephone Corporation.	Yes	Yes
.observer		—	Fegistry, LLC		Yes
.org	general	—	Public Interest Registry		Yes
.one	general	—	One Registry	Unknown	Yes
.ong	Non-governmental organizations.	Restricted to validated NGOs, as determined by PIR.	Public Interest Registry	Unknown	Yes
.onl	generic	—	I-REGISTRY	Unknown	Yes
.online	generic	—	Radix Registry	Unknown	Yes
.ooo	general	—	AvenuesAI	Yes	Yes
.open	private to the "Registry Operator and its qualified Affiliates and Trademark Licensees"	—	American Express Travel Related Services Company, Inc.		Yes
.organic	organic gardeners, farmers, foods, etc.	Registrants must be verified as a member of the organic community.	Identity Digital	Unknown	Yes
.page		—	Charleston Road Registry Inc. (Google)		Yes
.partners	Law firms, real estate agencies, investment firms, accounting firms, nonprofit organizations	—	Identity Digital (Note: Operating as Magic Glen, LLC)	Yes	Yes
.parts	Appliance wholesalers & service, tool rentals & service businesses, auto/boat/heavy equipment businesses	—	Identity Digital (Note: Operating as Sea Goodbye, LLC)	Yes	Yes
.party	nightclubs and social gatherings or political parties	—	GRS Domains	Unknown	Yes
.pay	electronic payments	—	Amazon Registry Services, Inc.		Yes
.pet	animals and pets	—	Identity Digital		Yes
.pharmacy	pharmacies	"All registrants within the .pharmacy gTLD are vetted prior to registration to confirm that they meet all applicable regulatory standards, including pharmacy licensure and valid prescription requirements, in the jurisdictions where they are based and where they serve patients."	National Association of Boards of Pharmacy	Unknown	Yes
.phone	telephone-related businesses	—	Dish DBS Corporation		Yes
.photo	photography and photo-sharing	—	Registry Services, LLC	Yes	Yes
.photography	Professional photographers, camera and equipment retailers, photo studios & photography schools, wedding and specialty photographers, anyone who wants to share photos online	—	Identity Digital (Note: Operating as Sugar Glen, LLC)	Yes	Yes
.photos	Professional photographers, camera and equipment retailers, photo studios & photography schools, wedding and specialty photographers, anyone who wants to share photos online	—	Identity Digital (Note: Operating as Sea Corner, LLC)	Yes	Yes
.physio	physical therapists	Must be eligible for membership within an association that is a member of the World Confederation for Physical Therapy, have proper training as a physical therapist outside WCPT's reach, or otherwise supports physical therapy.	PhysBiz	Unknown	Yes
.pics	photography and photo-sharing	—	Uniregistry	Yes	Yes
.pictures	Professional photographers, camera and equipment retailers, photo studios & photography schools, wedding and specialty photographers, anyone who wants to share photos online	—	Identity Digital (Note: Operating as Foggy Sky, LLC)	Yes	Yes
.pid	personal identification	—	Top Level Spectrum	Unknown	Yes
.pin		—	Amazon Registry Services, Inc.		Yes
.pink		—	Identity Digital	Yes	Yes
.pizza	Pizzerias, take & bake pizza shops, Italian or Greek restaurants, pizza brands found in grocery stores	—	Identity Digital (Note: Operating as Foggy Moon, LLC)	Yes	Yes
.place	Airline-related products or services, travel agencies, resources & services, travel writers & bloggers, tourist attractions, hotels, hostels, B&Bs, lodging	—	Identity Digital (Note: Operating as Snow Galley, LLC)	Yes	Yes
.plumbing	Plumbers & plumbing repair businesses, plumbing departments within home supply stores, contractors/subcontractors, DIYers	—	Identity Digital (Note: Operating as Spring Tigers, LLC)	Yes	Yes
.plus	Consumer commodity stores & sites, clothing (plus, big & tall), service-based businesses, any entity wanting to show their competitive advantage	—	Identity Digital	Yes	Yes
.poker	Poker players and sites	—	Identity Digital (Note: Operating as Afilias Domains No. 5 Limited.)	Unknown	Yes
.porn	adult entertainment (pornography)	For sites providing sexually explicit content, such as pornography.	Identity Digital	Yes	Yes
.post	postal services	The .post TLD is restricted to Postal Administrations as defined in the Universal Postal Union constitution, and their large customers who wish to provide "Trusted Postal Services".	Universal Postal Union	No	Yes
.press	publishing and journalism	—	Radix Registry	Unknown	Yes
.prime		Reserved for Amazon Prime	Amazon Registry Services, Inc.		Yes
.pro	professions/professionals	—	Identity Digital	No	Yes
.productions	Advertising/Marketing/PR/Design agencies, media buying/production companies (digital & traditional), video production services, anyone in the film industry	—	Identity Digital (Note: Operating as Magic Birch, LLC)	Yes	Yes
.prof	Professors, teachers and learning	—	Charleston Road Registry Inc. (Google)	Unknown	Yes
.promo	advertising	—	Identity Digital		Yes
.properties	Real estate brokers/agents, residential/Commercial land developers, property (condo/apartment) managers, home builders, mortgage companies	—	Identity Digital (Note: Operating as Big Pass, LLC)	Yes	Yes
.property	real estate	—	Uniregistry	Yes	Yes
.protection	security	—	XYZ.COM LLC		Yes
.pub	Pubs, bars & nightclubs, burger joints, breweries & taphouses, beer distributors, restaurant & bar suppliers publications	—	Identity Digital	Yes	Yes
.qpon	coupons	—	DOTQPON LLC.	Unknown	Yes
.quebec	People and businesses in Quebec	—	PointQuébec Inc	Unknown	Yes
.racing	racing	—	Global Registry Services Ltd	Unknown	Yes
.radio	radio stations, amateur radio operators	Restricted to people and companies with an active interest in the radio sector.	European Broadcasting Union (EBU)		Yes
.read		—	Amazon Registry Services, Inc.		Yes
.realestate	real estate	—	dotRealEstate LLC		Yes
.realtor	realtors	To be restricted to members of the National Association of Realtors and the Canadian Real Estate Association, and related associations.	Real Estate Domains	Unknown	Yes
.realty	realty and housing	—	Fegistry, LLC		Yes
.recipes	Recipe sites, food & beverage grocery brands, health & fitness organizations, cooking enthusiasts, personal/professional chefs	—	Identity Digital (Note: Operating as Grand Island, LLC)	Yes	Yes
.red	those who like the color red Also Spanish variant of .net Also likely to be attractive for domain hacks for words that end with '-red'.	—	Identity Digital	Yes	Yes
.rehab	Physical and occupational therapists and professionals, drug, alcohol and gambling addiction counselors, rehabilitation facilities and recovery centers, online health directories, physical or emotional health associations	—	Identity Digital	Yes	Yes
.reit	real estate investment trusts	Restricted to REITs, as determined by national law.	National Association of Real Estate Investment Trusts	Unknown	Yes
.rent	Real estate professionals and small businesses	—	xyz.xyz	Unknown	Yes
.rentals	Real estate brokers/agents, city guides, college housing centers, & community centers, vehicle, equipment, or entertainment/event rentals, property managers, condo/apartment developers	—	Identity Digital (Note: Operating as Big Hollow, LLC)	Yes	Yes
.repair	General or specialty repair shops, construction contractors/subcontractors, DIYers, appliance wholesalers & service, auto/boat businesses	—	Identity Digital (Note: Operating as Lone Sunset, LLC)	Yes	Yes
.report	News and current events sites, financial reporting sites, financial or business analysts, consumer product reviews, police, school, or other community report listings	—	Identity Digital (Note: Operating as Binky Glen, LLC)	Yes	Yes
.republican	Political candidates, lobbyists, political parties, fundraising organizations	—	Identity Digital	Yes	Yes
.rest	Restaurants and related industry	—	Punto 2012	Yes	Yes
.restaurant	Casual eateries, gourmet restaurants, suppliers, chains, review sites, reservation sites & services	—	Identity Digital (Note: Operating as Snow Avenue, LLC)	Yes	Yes
.review	public reviews	—	Global Registry Services Ltd	Unknown	Yes
.reviews	News media, food publications, travel publications, literary publications, any product & service with online reviews	—	Identity Digital	Yes	Yes
.rich	businesses catering to the wealthy	—	I-REGISTRY	Unknown	Yes
.rip	Loved ones seeking to memorialize the deceased, funeral homes and cemeteries, businesses that support the funeral industry, obituary websites	—	Identity Digital	Yes	Yes
.rocks	Pop culture sites, niche and fan sites, musicians, gemstone & jewelry companies	—	Identity Digital	Yes	Yes
.rodeo	Rodeo interest	—	Minds + Machines	Yes	Yes
.room	lodging or room design	—	Amazon Registry Services, Inc.		Yes
.rugby	rugby	—	World Rugby Strategic Developments Limited		Yes
.run	Runners, running shoe retailers, specialty running gear shops, running event organizers	—	Identity Digital	Yes	Yes
.safe	security and safety	—	Amazon Registry Services, Inc.		Yes
.sale	Online and brick-and-mortar retailers and wholesalers, automotive and motorcycle dealers, discount, flash sale, and deal websites, auction sites and individuals selling items they no longer need	—	Identity Digital	Yes	Yes
.salon	Hair salons, nail salons, beauty product companies, beauty schools	—	Identity Digital	Yes	Yes
.save		—	Amazon Registry Services, Inc.		Yes
.sbi		—	State Bank of India		Yes
.scholarships	scholarship related	—	Scholarships.com	Unknown	Yes
.school	Public schools, private & charter schools, specialty and trade schools, online learning sites, resource sites for teachers	—	Identity Digital (Note: Operating as Little Galley, LLC)	Yes	Yes
.science	science-related sites	—	Global Registry Services Ltd	Unknown	Yes
.search	search engines	—	Charleston Road Registry Inc. (Google)		Yes
.secure	security	—	Amazon Registry Services, Inc.		Yes
.security		—	XYZ.COM LLC		Yes
.select		—	iSelect Ltd		Yes
.services	Service division of any company, home services (cleaning, landscaping, plumbing, pet care), business services (tech support, interior design, translation services), community service organizations	—	Identity Digital (Note: Operating as Fox Castle, LLC)	Yes	Yes
.sex	adult entertainment (pornography)	For sites providing sexually explicit content, such as pornography.	ICM Registry	Yes	Yes
.sexy	adult entertainment	—	Uniregistry	Yes	Yes
.shoes	Shoe stores, department stores, online retailers, athletic shoe retailers, discount shoe stores	—	Identity Digital (Note: Operating as Binky Galley, LLC)	Yes	Yes
.shop		—	GMO Registry, Inc.		Yes
.shopping	Online retailers, shopping centers, personal shoppers, discount sites & coupon sites, shopping blogs & product reviews	—	Identity Digital	Yes	Yes
.show	Ticket sale/resale sites, performance halls, music clubs/bars, streaming video services, movie review sites, travel sites & city guides	—	Identity Digital	Yes	Yes
.silk		Reserved for Amazon Silk	Amazon Registry Services, Inc.		Yes
.singles	(Tickets) Ticket sale/resale sites, gaming agencies, movie review sites, city guides, sports sites (Dating) Dating & matchmaker sites, singles meetup groups, traditional “classified” sites, travel sites & city guides	—	Identity Digital (Note: Operating as Fern Madison, LLC)	Yes	Yes
.site	general	—	Radix Registry	Unknown	Yes
.ski	skiing	—	STARTING DOT LIMITED		Yes
.skin		—	XYZ.com		Yes
.sky		—	Sky International AG		Yes
.sling		Reserved for Sling Media	DISH Technologies L.L.C.		Yes
.smart		Reserved to Smart Communications, a wireless telecommunications in the Philippines.	Smart Communications, Inc.	No	No
.smile		—	Amazon Registry Services, Inc.		Yes
.sncf		Reserved to the SNCF company.	SNCF		Yes
.soccer	Professional & amateur soccer clubs, soccer equipment suppliers & manufacturers, soccer & sports media networks, soccer players, enthusiasts, & spectators, soccer camps, coaches, & training organizations	—	Identity Digital	Yes	Yes
.social	Advertising/Marketing/PR/Design agencies, media buying/production companies (digital & traditional), blogs & forums, event & meetup groups, any person or organization driving awareness of their social presence (Actual use also includes Fediverse services, such as Mastodon)	—	Identity Digital	Yes	Yes
.software	Software testing, support, & consulting companies, software product developers & manufacturers, software training & educational institutions, software resellers	—	Identity Digital	Yes	Yes
.solar	Renewable & sustainable energy producers, solar panel, roof tile, & storage producers, solar cell battery, chargers, lights, speakers, & generator manufacturers, sunglass, shades, UV clothing, sunblock & other solar protection products	—	Identity Digital (Note: Operating as Ruby Town, LLC)	Yes	Yes
.solutions	SaaS providers, people who offer do-it-yourself tips and tutorials, consultants, any business focused on providing the right solutions to their customers’ problems.	—	Identity Digital (Note: Operating as Asia Spa and Wellness Promotion Council Limited)	Yes	Yes
.song		—	Amazon Registry Services, Inc.		Yes
.spa	Spas	—	Identity Digital		Yes
.space	as a creative space	—	Radix Registry	Unknown	Yes
.spreadbetting	Spread betting	—	DOTSPREADBETTING REGISTRY LTD		
.spot		—	Amazon Registry Services, Inc.		Yes
.sport	sport institutions	—	Global Association of International Sports Federations (GAISF)		Yes
.srl	Spanish/Italian/Romanian/French limited liability companies	—	InterNetX GmbH		Yes
.storage	Self storage	—	Self Storage Company LLC		Yes
.store	stores	—	Radix Registry	Yes	Yes
.stream	streaming media		Global Registry Services Ltd		Yes
.studio	Advertising/Marketing/PR/Design agencies, creative freelancers, other creative agencies (i.e., animation, production), dance, yoga, or fitness studios	—	Identity Digital	Yes	Yes
.study	education	—	OPEN UNIVERSITIES AUSTRALIA PTY LTD		Yes
.style	Fashion bloggers, department stores, designers, online retailers	—	Identity Digital	Yes	Yes
.sucks	gripe sites	—	Vox Populi	Unknown	Yes
.supplies	Contractors, distribution companies, appliance wholesalers & service, auto/boat/heavy equipment businesses, home services retailers	—	Identity Digital (Note: Operating as Atomic Fields, LLC)	Yes	Yes
.supply	Contractors, distribution companies, appliance wholesalers & service, auto/boat/heavy equipment businesses	—	Identity Digital (Note: Operating as Half Falls, LLC)	Yes	Yes
.support	IT/Tech support services, social services, customer service & support departments, independent consultants & consulting firms, staffing services	—	Identity Digital (Note: Operating as Grand Orchard, LLC)	Yes	Yes
.surf	surfing	—	Minds + Machines	Unknown	Yes
.surgery	Surgeons, primary/secondary care physicians, hospitals & clinics, healthcare providers, insurance providers	—	Identity Digital (Note: Operating as Tin Avenue, LLC)	Yes	Yes
.systems	IT businesses, other tech-focused businesses, businesses that sell electronics or home security systems, organizational consultants	—	Identity Digital (Note: Operating as Dash Cypress, LLC)	Yes	Yes
.talk		—	Amazon Registry Services, Inc.		Yes
.tattoo	tattoo aficionados	—	Uniregistry	Yes	Yes
.tax	Accounting & bookkeeping firms, tax advisors, auditors, financial experts & advisors	—	Identity Digital	Yes	Yes
.taxi	Airline & travel-related products or services, city guides & tourist attractions, transportation businesses, hotels, hostels, B&Bs, lodging, tourist attractions	—	Identity Digital	Yes	Yes
.team	Professional & amateur sports teams, sports equipment suppliers & manufacturers, sports media, athletes & fans, clubs, online communities & business organizations	—	Identity Digital	Yes	Yes
.tech	technology	—	Radix Registry	Yes	Yes
.technology	Tech-focused businesses & tech startups, businesses that sell to tech companies, developers, coders, programmers, computer retailers, technology blogs, news sites, & review sites, hardware & software companies, R&D companies, tech product manufacturers	—	Identity Digital	Yes	Yes
.tel	Internet communication services	A contact directory housing all types of contact information directly in the Domain Name System.		Yes	Yes
.tennis	Tennis courts, clubs & other venues, tennis equipment suppliers and retailers, professional & amateur tennis players, sports media	—	Identity Digital	Yes	Yes
.theater	Entertainment & movie theater outlets, live performance theaters, professional performer associations, movie review sites, travel sites & city guides	—	Identity Digital	Yes	Yes
.theatre	theatre	—	XYZ.COM LLC		Yes
.tickets	ticket resale	—	XYZ.COM LLC		Yes
.tips	Travel, hotel & hospitality companies, cooking & recipe publications, parenting & and relationship publications, manufacturers of any product with assembly instructions, publications that provide advice on gratuity practices around the world	—	Identity Digital	Yes	Yes
.tires	Tire wholesalers, tire retailers, auto repair shops	—	Identity Digital	Yes	Yes
.today	News & current event sites, websites that publish daily content, daily inspiration sites, sites with daily rotating deals or offers, anyone who wants to spur immediate action	—	Identity Digital	Yes	Yes
.tools	Tool shops, tool departments within home supply stores, contractors, subcontractors, construction-related businesses	—	Identity Digital	Yes	Yes
.top	general	—	Jiangsu Bangning	Unknown	Yes
.tours	Airline-related products or services, travel agencies, resources & services, tourist attractions, outdoor adventure companies, private plane/helicopter tours & services	—	Identity Digital	Yes	Yes
.town	Travel agencies, resources & services, local business associations, city guides & resource sites, transportation businesses, hotels, hostels, B&Bs, lodging	—	Identity Digital	Yes	Yes
.toys	Toy stores, online retailers, department stores, game companies, sporting goods companies	—	Identity Digital	Yes	Yes
.trade	businesses	—	Global Registry Services Ltd	Yes	Yes
.trading		—	Identity Digital		Yes
.training	Personal trainers & nutrition coaches, gyms and fitness centers, sports medicine practitioners, business that sell sports gear or apparel, or fan merchandise, animal trainers, career or vocational training centers	—	Identity Digital	Yes	Yes
.travel	Airline-related products or services, travel agencies, resources, bloggers & services, city guides & tourist attractions, transportation businesses, destination resorts, hotels, hostels, B&Bs, lodging, any other travel or transportation business	Must be verified as a legitimate travel-related entity.	Identity Digital	No	Yes
.trust		—	UNR Corp.		Yes
.tube		—	Latin American Telecom LLC		Yes
.tunes		—	Amazon Registry Services, Inc.		Yes
.university	Online universities, brick-and-mortar universities, university-related clubs & organizations	—	Identity Digital	Yes	Yes
.uno	general, Spanish and Italian speakers, Uno (card game)	—	Radix Technologies Inc.		Yes
.vacations	Airline-related products or services, travel agencies, resources, bloggers & services, city guides & tourist attractions, transportation businesses, destination resorts, hotels, hostels, B&Bs, lodging	—	Identity Digital	Yes	Yes
.ventures	Venture capital investment firms, business financial services, business consultants, programs & services for entrepreneurs	—	Identity Digital	Yes	Yes
.vet	Veterinarians, veterinary clinics and hospitals, wholesale suppliers for veterinary supplies	—	Identity Digital	Yes	Yes
.video	Video production & media companies, videographers, video editors, script writers, & producers, streaming video sites services, creative agencies	—	Identity Digital	Yes	Yes
.villas	International real estate brokers/agents, international travel agencies, resources & services, travel writers & bloggers, traditional “classified” sites	—	Identity Digital	Yes	Yes
.vin	Wineries, wine shops & wine bars, wine distributors, wine clubs & online retailers, wine review sites and apps	—	Identity Digital	Yes	Yes
.vip	Very important persons	—	Minds + Machines Group Limited		Yes
.vision	Opticians & optometry clinics, healthcare providers, insurance provider, glasses retailers, online and brick & mortar	—	Identity Digital	Yes	Yes
.vodka	vodka-related businesses and interest	—		Yes	Yes
.volvo		Only Volvo Holding Sverige Aktiebolag and its Affiliates are eligible to register a Domain Name under the .volvo Domain	AB Volvo	Unknown	Yes
.vote	democratic elections and campaign websites	Must use the domain in connection with a "clearly identified political/democratic process."	Identity Digital	Unknown	Yes
.voting	polling sites	—		Latin and Cyrillic scripts	Yes
.voyage	Airline-related products or services, travel agencies, resources, bloggers & services, city guides & tourist attractions, transportation businesses, hotels, hostels, B&Bs, lodging	—	Identity Digital	Yes	Yes
.wang	general Wǎng is a Chinese Mandarin pinyin rendering of 网 (traditional 網) meaning "web" or "portal". Wang is also a common surname in mainland China.	—	Zodiac Registry	Yes	Yes
.watch	Watchmakers, jewelry stores, watch repair shops, neighborhood watch groups	—	Identity Digital	Yes	Yes
.watches	watches	—	Identity Digital	Yes	Yes
.weather		Reserved for The Weather Channel	The Weather Company, LLC		Yes
.webcam	web cam shows and video sharing	—	Global Registry Services Ltd	Yes	Yes
.website	general	—	Radix Registry	Unknown	Yes
.wed	engaged couples and wedding-oriented businesses	This TLD is intended primarily for engaged couples on a short-term basis (two years with large third-year renewal fees for second-level domains). And although the registry is advertising for multiple world languages, all domains appear to need to be in Latin script.		No	Yes
.wedding	wedding-oriented businesses	—	Minds + Machines	Yes	Yes
.whoswho	Who's Who (general)	An open TLD, any person or entity is permitted to register. Conceived for those cited in one of the Who's Who reference titles published around the world, the registry was opened for use by private individuals, and for-profit and nonprofit entities, including those with social media aspirations. Registry policies allow for rapid takedown of non-compliant domains, for violations including imposturous registration of another's names, and proscribed uses, including pornography or adult services/applications.	Who's Who Registry	Yes	Yes
.wiki	wikis	"An open TLD for anyone interested in community resource creation"	GoDaddy Registry	Yes	Yes
.win	games, Microsoft Windows	—	Global Registry Services Ltd	Unknown	Yes
.wine	Wineries, wine bars, wine shops, wine distributors, wine clubs & online retailers, wine review sites	—	Identity Digital	Yes	Yes
.winners		Reserved for TJX Companies	The TJX Companies, Inc.		Yes
.work	general	—	Minds + Machines	Yes	Yes
.works	Contractors, distribution companies, appliance wholesalers & service, auto/boat/heavy equipment businesses, companies with solution based products or services	—	Identity Digital	Yes	Yes
.world	Brands with an international presence, nonprofits and charities, travel agencies & adventure companies, world travelers & global communities, any business with “world” in its name	—	Identity Digital	Yes	Yes
.wow		—	Amazon Registry Services, Inc.		Yes
.wtf	Bargain websites, photo & video aggregators, meme sites, news of the weird	—	Identity Digital	Yes	Yes
.xxx	adult entertainment (pornography)	For sites providing sexually explicit content, such as pornography.	Uniregistry	Yes	Yes
.xyz	general	—	XYZ.com	Yes	Yes
.yachts	yachts	—	DERYachts, LLC		Yes
.yoga	yoga	—	Minds + Machines	Yes	Yes
.you		—	Amazon Registry Services, Inc.		Yes

== See also ==
- List of internet top-level domains
