= .sexy =

Internet top-level domain

- Introduced: 2013
- TLD type: Generic top-level domain
- Status: Active
- Registry: Uniregistry
- Intended use: Adult entertainment
- Registered domains: 10,203 (September 2023)
- DNSSEC: Yes
- IDN: Yes

.sexy is a generic top-level domain owned by Uniregistry. Delegated on 14 November 2013, .sexy was the subject of controversy due to opposition from the government of Saudi Arabia and privacy concerns regarding registering domains.

== History ==
.sexy, along with .tattoo, was one of the first two gTLDs launched by Uniregistry on 14 November 2013. Its sunrise period, during which pre-existing trademark holders may register URLs prior to general availability to prevent domain squatting, lasted from 11 December 2013 to 9 February 2014, and it entered general availability on 25 February 2014. .sexy was one of the first hundred gTLDs to be delegated. Prior to its release, .sexy was one of many announced gTLDs, variously reported as 31 and over 160, that the Communication and Information Technology Commission of the government of Saudi Arabia objected to; other TLDs found objectionable included .gay, .casino, .sucks, .wine, and .bible.

On the first day of .sexy's general availability, around 2,000 domain names were registered, which commentators described as a "disappointing" low showing. The domain had a comparable number of first-day registrations as unpopular domains from Uniregistry's competitor Donuts such as .gallery and .estate. .sexy's launch was hampered by a lack of support from and availability at major domain name registrars such as GoDaddy, based in privacy concerns around Uniregistry's demands that registrants inform Uniregistry of their real names and identities to purchase domains. A number of pre-orders of .sexy domains were also stymied by domain name collision, the phenomenon where a private (intranet) domain name system queries a public one, and by names that had been pre-ordered being reserved by Uniregistry.

In 2015, a survey by ICANN concluded networks in Iran were systematically blocking .sexy domains. In 2017, Uniregistry CEO Frank Schilling increased the price of .sexy and a number of other domains due to low uptake. Schilling stated that the costs of running a TLD demanded that low-use TLDs, such as .sexy, be sold at higher price points in order to turn a profit.

== Usage ==
According to Schilling, .sexy domains are intended "for fun, for fashion, for recreation, as a novelty, [and] for risqué content". .sexy has also been associated with cybersquatting, with cybersquatters purchasing .sexy domains for major companies who rejected having their trademarks associated with adult industries; such misuse was predicted prior to the domain's release, with commentators describing them as potentially costing companies "serious money". Explicit content is prohibited on the home pages of websites with .sexy domains, although sites are permitted to have a landing page with a warning button that needs to be clicked through to access such content.

As of 2023, there are 10,203 registered .sexy domains, making up 0.03% of all domains. NameCheap holds the majority of the .sexy market share with 65.8%, although 14% of .sexy domains are registered by registries outside the top ten. The domain's lack of popularity was described by domain expert Kevin Murphy as a failure of Schilling's own practices:

You can put pretty much any profession or product name in front of a .guru and it is meaningful as a brand or a rather grandiose self-appointed title. Not so with .sexy. Ironically, this appears to be [Schilling's] "Toilet Paper Test" in action. Schilling argues that the test of how generic, and by extension popular, a gTLD is should be whether toiletpaper.[tld] works. I think toiletpaper.guru works, but toiletpaper.sexy does not.

— Kevin Murphy, Domain Incite

== See also ==
- Internet pornography
