= .one =

.one may refer to:

- a file extension used by Microsoft OneNote
- .one (domain), a top-level domain
