= .monster =

Internet top-level domain

- Status: Active
- Registry: XYZ.com
- Intended use: Initially for Monster.com, later made generic
- Registered domains: 85,593 (17 March 2024)

.monster is a generic top-level domain (gTLD) owned by XYZ.com. Originally delegated in 2014 by the employment website Monster.com as a brand-specific domain name, .monster was acquired by XYZ in 2019 as a general domain.

== History ==
Following the announcement in January 2012 that Internet Corporation for Assigned Names and Numbers (ICANN), the organization responsible for internet top-level domains, were accepting applications for new domain names, both the audio and video cable manufacturer Monster Cable and the employment website Monster.com sought to register the gTLD .monster as a dot-brand, a type of gTLD restricted to use by a specific company. Though they both applied prior to June 2012, the date ICANN revealed the names of early applicants, the matter of which would ultimately acquire the domain was not settled until late 2014. The two companies were scheduled to participate in an auction, ICANN's "mechanism of last resort" for unresolvable disputes over the owner of a domain, that December; a week prior, Monster Cable withdrew their application, leaving Monster.com to acquire the gTLD. Monster.com's application referred to .monster as a "restricted, exclusively-controlled gTLD" for which only the company themselves and "authorized business partners" could register domains, with parties who were unconnected to Monster.com or deemed to use .monster domains in ways that harmed the company's "brand reputation" at risk of suspension without warning.

Though dot-brand domain registrations were popular at the original launch of new gTLDs, many companies later relinquished them due to lack of use. Monster.com retired .monster in 2018, at which time it was picked up by XYZ.com with the intent of running it as a general-purpose TLD. It was the second former dot-brand to be repurposed as a general domain, following the 2016 acquisition of .observer from The Observer by Top Level Spectrum. Its thirty-day sunrise period, during which pre-existing trademark holders may register domain names prior to general availability to prevent domain squatting, launched 18 February 2019. .monster became available for general registration on 1 April 2019. 84 .monster domains were registered during the sunrise period, including cookie.monster, pocket.monster, and lochness.monster.

== Usage ==
At the launch of .monster, XYZ.com CEO Daniel Negari referred to it as a "wacky and creative" domain for users wanting to metaphorically demonstrate being "a beast at what [they] do". Multiple commentators have described the use case of .monster as unclear, with James Sanders at TechRepublic saying "the 'who is this for' question is a difficult one to answer" and Andrew Allemann of Domain Name Wire feeling the announcement "seem[ed] like a bad April Fools' Day joke". The journalist and gTLD commentator Kevin Murphy compared .monster to .guru and .ninja, describing it as a "quirky" option but not necessarily one suitable for widespread use.

.monster has been associated with spamming and phishing. Research in 2023 by the cybersecurity analyst David Barnett and domain name brand manager Justin Hartland found .monster to be one of the thirty highest-threat TLDs for phishing attacks. The cybercrime prevention company Netcraft defines .monster as one of the TLDs with the highest ratio of "cybercrime incidents" to active websites, with around 1.2% of all active .monster domains in 2023 fitting Netcraft's definition of cybercriminality. .monster domains may be blocked by email providers; Jarland Donnell, owner of the email hosting service MXroute, said that same year that blocking emails from .monster domains had "a 0% correlation [with] blocking legitimate emails" and that every email from the gTLD his service received was spam. Donnell speculated that .monster itself was a "strategic spamming campaign" rather than a legitimate gTLD, stating his analysis of the networks from which .monster emails originated found a limited number of networks using a vast number of throwaway domains.

As of 2023, there are 99,096 registered .monster domains, making up 0.29% of all domains. No registrar holds a majority of the .monster market share; Namecheap and Name.com hold 34.7% and 30.7% of .monster domains, respectively. Other registrars with significant .monster market share are NameSilo, GoDaddy, and Porkbun.

== See also ==
- The Spamhaus Project
