= Gimmee Jimmy's Cookies =

American cookie bakery

- Type: Private
- Founded: West Orange, New Jersey (1983)
- Founder: Jimmy Libman
- Headquarters: Hawthorne, New Jersey, U.S.
- Number of employees: 20
- Website: http://www.gjcookies.com

Gimmee Jimmy's Cookies was founded in 1983 in West Orange, New Jersey, United States, by Jimmy Libman. Born deaf, Libman overcame his "disability" to run the cookie company by himself for more than 20 years. To supplement his work, Libman hired other deaf workers, offering them a place to hone their skills, and showing everyone that being deaf is not a limitation on success. The company was sold and briefly operated retail stores before being revived in 2009, returning to its original focus on gift tins.

== History ==
Under Libman, Gimmee Jimmy's Cookies focused primarily on Christmas-season gift tins, serving individual and corporate customers. All production was accomplished in a small facility on South Valley Road in West Orange. Libman eventually sold the company to a group interested in expanding the Gimmee Jimmy's Cookies brand from gift tins to a full retail-store experience. This group then opened two retail stores, known as Gimmee Jimmy's Cookie Bars, in Montclair, New Jersey and Livingston, New Jersey, respectively. The Cookie Bars married Gimmee Jimmy's Cookies with coffee and desserts, including cupcakes and muffins. The economic downturn of 2008 forced the group which had purchased the company from Libman to go out of business.

In 2009, Gimmee Jimmy's Cookies was revived when it was purchased by a group based in Sarasota, Florida, which intends to grow Gimmee Jimmy's Cookies into a nationally recognized brand. The following steps have been and are being taken to improve the business:

- The original recipes first used by Mr. Libman in 1983 are being revived for use today.
- The under-performing retail stores were shuttered.

In 2014, Gimmee Jimmy's Cookies moved online, opening a large bakery in Inwood, New York, near John F. Kennedy International Airport, to facilitate faster shipping. Headed by Freeman Lewin, Gimmee Jimmy's Cookies has returned to its roots of gift tins and corporate gifts and technology enabling large corporations to order en-masse. Since 2014, Gimmee Jimmy's Cookies has been featured in Inc, Business Weekly, and Inquirer, and on BuzzFeed.

To re-claim the do-good nature of the company from its founding, the new owners formed the Gimmee Jimmy's Children's Foundation, to steer a portion of company proceeds to cheering children who are hospitalized with pediatric diseases. In addition to the Gimmee Jimmy's Children's Foundation, the company is heavily involved in fundraising opportunities for schools, places of worship, and other non-profits.

Gimme Jimmy's Cookies are certified under the OK Kosher Certification and the Volover Rav; Gimme Jimmy's is pas Yisroel, and cholov Yisroel if dairy is used.
