= .fun =

Internet top-level domain

- Introduced: December 20, 2016; 8 years ago
- TLD type: Generic top-level domain
- Status: Active
- Registry: Radix
- Sponsor: Radix FCZ
- Intended use: Entertainment websites
- Registered domains: 373,754 (4 January 2023)
- Registration restrictions: None
- Structure: Registry at second level allowed
- Dispute policies: UDRP
- DNSSEC: Yes
- IDN: No
- Registry website: nic.fun

.fun is a generic top-level domain (gTLD) of the Domain Name System used on the Internet. The name is derived from the English word fun.

== History ==
The .fun domain was registered in December 2016. It is currently owned by Radix, a company which owns several other generic top-level domains. According to Radix, the target group of the top-level domain is for "individuals or organisations who wish to entertain the target audience."

== Usage ==
.fun is used by a variety of entertainment-related websites, including an Australian website which helps parents find safe places for their kids to play and an event organizer for companies.
