= Bernard Levy =

Chabad-Lubavitch rabbi

Rabbi Bernard (Berel) Levy was a pioneer of kosher certification in the United States.

== Education ==
Bernard Levy grew up in the 1920s outside of New York City. At the age of ten, he left home and moved in with his uncle. The move enabled him to attend the Yeshiva Torah Vodaas. He later traveled to study at the famed Lubavitcher Yeshiva in Otwock, Poland.

He arrived in Otwock in 1937 and spent two years studying there. While there, rabbi Velvel Soloveitchik of Brisk befriended him. Most significant of all was his accessibility to the 6th Lubavitcher Rebbe, rabbi Yosef Yitzchok Schneersohn and the fact that he was able to go into private audience with him. On the outbreak of World War II, he returned to the United States and in 1940 he was among the first students who sat down to learn in the Lubavitcher Yeshiva in 770 Eastern Parkway.

== Career ==
=== Jewish education ===
In 1944, rabbi Yosef Yitzchok Schneersohn sent Levy to New Haven and worked tirelessly establishing the day yeshiva.

From New Haven, he moved to Lakewood, NJ where he worked in the day school for three years. There he met rabbi Aaron Kotler, with whom he would work closely in later years. After Lakewood, he moved to Elizabeth, New Jersey. Leaving Elizabeth for Brooklyn in 1960, he went to work for Torah U'Mesorah. At that time, he was closely associated with various Gedolim (great personalities) of various factions in Orthodox Jewry. His spiritual leader, rabbi Menachem Mendel Schneerson would speak to him for hours concerning educational issues in the United States. He served as an unofficial conduit between the Rebbe and Rabbi Aaron Kotler and other Gedolim. He once spent an entire night discussing Torah U'Mesorah with the previous Satmar Rebbe. On this point, he also met and started a long relationship with rabbi Moshe Feinstein.

=== Kosher supervision ===
In the mid-1960s, he started working in the field of kosher. At that time, certification was given with very little technical knowledge of the food industry. Often people just assumed things were kosher judging by the ingredients on the label. He took over some hechsherim in 1965. He started out with eleven or twelve hechsherim, and because of his personality and drive, companies kept coming to him applying for certification. He took over OK Kosher Certification in 1968. Until that time, no one had ever bothered traveling to check ingredients and products coming from overseas. Being a real pioneer in the kosher industry, rabbi Berel Levy always wanted to see how everything was produced. He would check as far back as he could, finding that each ingredient was made up of many ingredients until eventually he saw the need to certify the plants. And so, one thing led to another and international travel for kosher certification became a necessity. OK Labs was the first to begin certifying companies in the Far East, starting with palm oils and chemicals. Today in Malaysia, Singapore, Indonesia, Korea, Japan and China the OK is the primary kosher organization in that part of the world.

He was among the first to provide kosher certifications after examining the mechanical and chemical components of the food industry, and made extensive trips to the Far East to inspect products from the region. He also travelled to countries with limited ties to Jewish communities, and is credited as the first to visit Malaysia for this purpose. The Lubavitcher Rebbe would ask him to carry out specific tasks in the countries he visited, which he did in detail. A mikveh was built in the Philippines, and a mechitzah was installed in the synagogue in Kobe, Japan.

Levy died in 1987.
