= .radio =

Internet top-level domain

- Introduced: August 28, 2017
- TLD type: Generic top-level domain
- Status: Active
- Registry: European Broadcasting Union
- Sponsor: European Broadcasting Union
- Registration restrictions: Reserved for those in the radio sector
- Documents: Registration policies
- Registry website: nic.radio

.radio is a generic top-level domain used in the Domain Name System of the internet. The TLD was officially delegated to the European Broadcasting Union on 7 October 2016. Domain registration was made available on 28 August 2017.

== Usage ==
Usage of the .radio domain is reserved for those in the radio industry, including radio broadcast stations, amateur radio enthusiasts, and companies selling radio goods and services. In its first year of availability, approximately 2,500 .radio domains were registered, each application having been checked to prevent cybersquatting.

== See also ==
- .audio
