= .ngo and .ong =

Internet top-level domains

.ngo/.ong
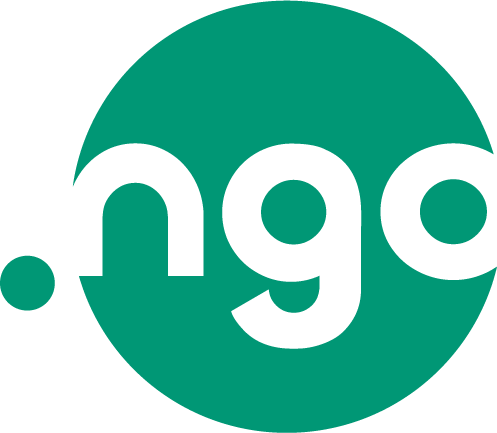
- Introduced: May 6, 2015
- TLD type: Generic top-level domain
- Status: Active
- Registry: Public Interest Registry
- Sponsor: Public Interest Registry
- Intended use: Non-profit organizations
- Actual use: Non-profit organizations
- Registered domains: 8,483 (combined) (15 March 2023)
- Registration restrictions: Proof of non-profit status required
- Structure: Registrations at second level permitted
- Documents: Registration policy
- Dispute policies: UDRP
- DNSSEC: yes
- Registry website: www.ongood.ngo

The domain names .ngo and .ong are generic top-level domains (gTLD) of the Domain Name System (DNS) used in the Internet, sponsored and managed by the Public Interest Registry. The backend is provided by Afilias. The .ngo domain name is an acronym which stands for "non-governmental organization", reflecting the intended usage of the domain.

In June 2011, ICANN expanded the Internet's naming system to allow applications for new top-level domain names. The Public Interest Registry declared publicly an interest in the .ngo domain in August 2011 and applied for it in May 2012. The PIR simultaneously applied for the top-level domain .ong, which is a similarly recognisable initialism for "organisation non gouvernementale" in French, and equivalent terms in many other Romance languages such as Spanish, Portuguese, Italian and Romanian.

Unlike the more prevalent .org domain, which is also managed by the Public Interest Registry, .ngo will require validation of the registrant's non-governmental status. Non-governmental organizations told the Public Interest Registry they needed a closed domain that validated the legitimacy of websites accepting online donations to avoid fraud. The Public Interest Registry plans to use the funds from selling .ngo domains to develop an "NGO Community Program" to reach out to NGOs in developing nations. It also intends to create a directory service of NGOs to support their SEO and visibility, and develop a closed community for NGOs to learn from each other. The new domains have been publicly available since May 6, 2015.

Originally, registrants did not purchase an .ngo or .ong domain name separately, and a single registration was valid for two domain names which end in either .ngo or .ong but were otherwise identical. This policy was relaxed in June 2022, and .ngo and .ong domain names can now be purchased independently of each other.
