= .store =

Generic top-level domain

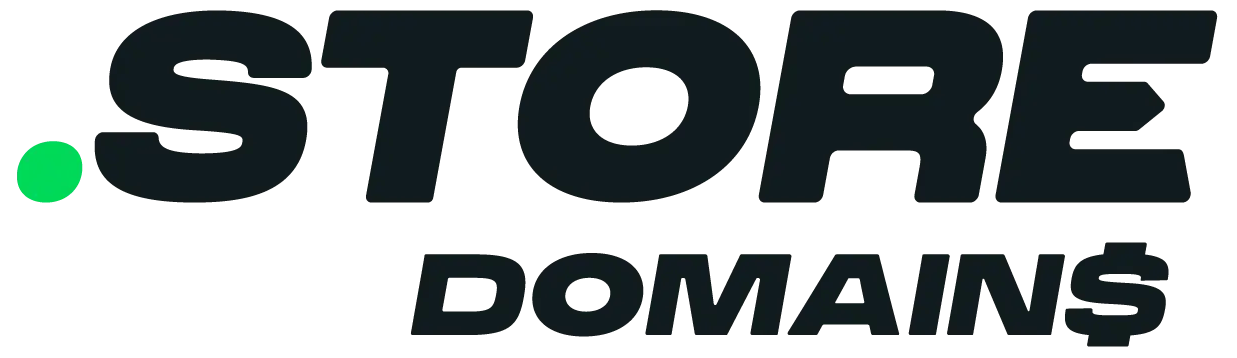
- Introduced: 14 June 2016
- TLD type: Generic top-level domain
- Status: Live
- Registry: Radix
- Sponsor: None
- Intended use: e-Commerce
- Registration restrictions: None
- Registry website: http://get.store

.store is a generic top-level domain (gTLD) of the Domain Name System (DNS) used in the Internet. It was the first domain extension to be launched specifically for ecommerce.

== History ==
The .store domain was initially thought of in 1997 by the International Ad Hoc Committee (IAHC). In 2012, ICANN announced it would be expanding the range of domain extensions to further organize the internet with new TLD's being requested by multiple parties. Seven companies including Radix, Google, Amazon, Uniregistry, Donuts (Sand Dale, LLC), Dot Store Group LLC, and Top Level Domain Holdings Ltd. filed applications for this TLD.

The .store TLD was launched in June 2016. It is currently owned and operated by Radix, founded by Bhavin Turakhia.

== Usage ==
This gTLD is used by an array of websites in the ecommerce sector with companies like Hanes, Emirates, Amazon, Apple, Nike and the luxury brand Jimmy Choo having purchased or launched sites that use the extension. The .store TLD is also used by performance artists such as Khalid, Foster The People, and Lorde as well as in the sports sector including NBA teams, F1, PSG, and Stipe Miocic for ecommerce and selling merchandise.
