= .bank =

Internet top-level domain

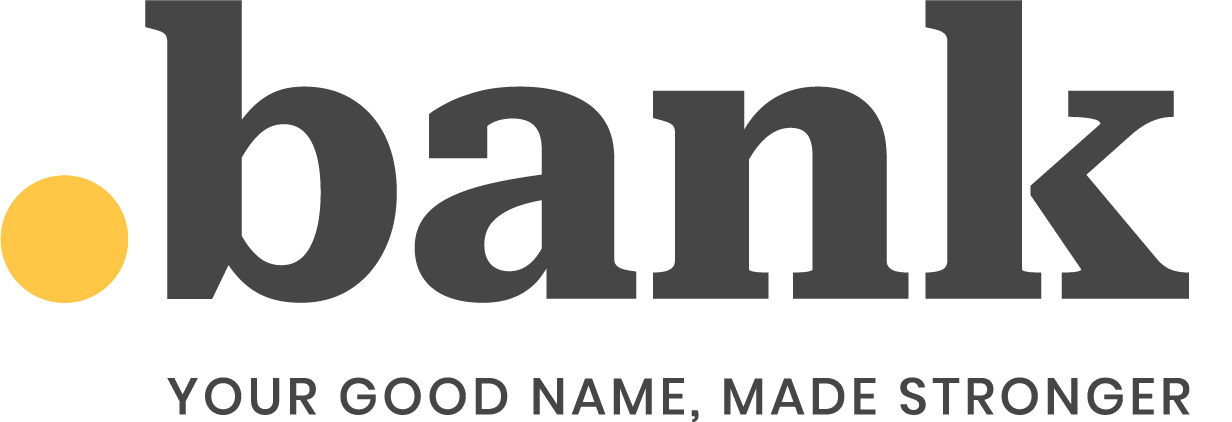
- Introduced: November 26, 2014 (root zone); January 5, 2015 (delegated)
- TLD type: Generic top-level domain
- Status: Active
- Registry: fTLD Registry Services
- Sponsor: Bank Policy Institute; American Bankers Association
- Registration restrictions: Reserved for those in the banking sector; domain names must correspond to organization's legal name or branding
- Documents: Policies
- Registry website: register.bank

Initial logo

.bank is a generic top level domain (gTLD) used in the Domain Name System of the internet. The TLD was officially delegated to fTLD Registry Services on behalf of the Financial Services Roundtable and the American Bankers Association on January 5, 2015.

The top-level domain was approved by ICANN in September 2014, but only became available to qualifying institutions the following year in May 2015. The .bank TLD has been included in the HSTS preload-list; as a result, popular web browsers will only connect to a .bank webpage using HTTPS.

== Proposals ==
When proposed back in 2011, it was hoped that the release and adoption of a .bank domain name by authorized institutions would help prevent phishing and identity theft. The project's general manager, Craig Schwartz, anticipated less than 10,000 .bank domains being registered due to the exclusive eligibility criteria.

== Usage ==
Usage of the .bank domain is reserved for those in the banking industry, including retail banks, savings associations, and related holding companies and associated organizations composed primarily of those entities. If approved by the fTLD board, government regulators of eligible companies and organizations, or organizations whose members are composed primarily of such government regulators, can register as well.

As of March 2017, around 2,400 banks in the United States had registered nearly 5,000 .bank domains, with 300 in active use at that time.

By September 2026, over 930 banking institutions had switched to a .bank domain as their primary website.

Registrations in the .bank domain are exclusive to eligible entities and subject to a verification process, providing visitors trust and authenticity that the .bank website is a legitimate bank.

== Security ==
Institutions operating with a .bank domain are subject to enhanced security requirements, including:

- Vetting process verified annually by fTLD Registry Services, LLC
- .bank TLD must be hosted on .bank name servers
- Registrations limited to approved registrars
- Usage of email authentication and two-factor authentication
- Usage of Domain Name System Security Extensions (DNSSEC)
