= .gdn =

Internet top-level domain

- Logo
- Introduced: August 27, 2015 (root server); March 7, 2016 (general public)
- TLD type: Generic top-level domain (gTLD)
- Status: Active
- Registry: GDN Registry
- Intended use: Generic domain
- Registration restrictions: None
- Documents: ICANN Registry Agreement; Anti-abuse policy Domain name policy
- Dispute policies: UDRP
- DNSSEC: Yes
- Registry website: www.nic.gdn

.gdn (short for Global Domain Name) is a generic top-level domain (TLD) name. It is a generic TLD as it has no intended audience and can be used by anyone. The Registry Agreement was made official on July 31, 2014. It became available to the general public on 7 March 2016.

The top three countries where .gdn is registered are the United States, China, and the Russian Federation.

.gdn made 300,000+ registrations in less than a year after general public launch. The domain is registered in 119 countries.
