= NameSilo =

Domain registrar

NameSilo LLC
- Industry: Domain registrar, Web hosting, SSL certificates
- Founded: 2010; 16 years ago
- Founder: Michael Goldfarb and Michael McCallister
- Headquarters: Phoenix, Arizona
- Area served: Worldwide
- Website: www.namesilo.com

NameSilo LLC is an American Internet domain name registrar and web hosting company headquartered in Phoenix, Arizona. It is owned by NameSilo Technologies Corp., which is listed on the Canadian Securities Exchange. NameSilo is an ICANN-accredited registrar providing domain registration, DNS services, web hosting, email, SSL certificates, and related internet products.

== History ==
NameSilo LLC was founded in 2010 by Michael Goldfarb and Michael McCallister in Phoenix, Arizona. Throughout the 2010s, the company expanded by emphasizing low-cost pricing, transparent fees, and free value-added services. In 2019, Domain Name Wire reported that NameSilo surpassed three million domains under management, noting its rate of growth compared to other registrars. By November 2020, NameSilo managed approximately 3.4 million active domains, ranking among the top 15 registrars globally by total domains under management.

NameSilo surpassed four million active domains in June 2021. In April 2023, an analysis of independent .com registration data by Domain Name Wire ranked the company ninth among the fastest-growing domain registrars for that month, noting that its registrations tended to fluctuate. In December 2024, NameSilo announced that it had exceeded five million active domains under management. In January 2026, NameSilo Technologies Corp. announced that NameSilo LLC had surpassed six million domains under management, placing it among the ten largest domain registrars worldwide by volume.

=== Acquisition and ownership ===
On August 7, 2018, Vancouver-based Brisio Innovations Inc. entered into a share purchase agreement to acquire a controlling interest in NameSilo LLC, an American domain registrar founded in 2010. Under the terms of the transaction, Brisio paid approximately US$9.5 million, plus an earn-out, to the previous owners of NameSilo.

As part of the transaction structure, Brisio Innovations acquired an 81.5% ownership stake in NameSilo LLC. The remaining 18.5% of the membership interests were retained by other parties, including Kristaps Ronka, who was appointed Chief Executive Officer of NameSilo, as well as certain third-party shareholders associated with a related digital services business.

In November 2018, Brisio Innovations Inc. announced that it would change its corporate name to NameSilo Technologies Corp., positioning itself as the publicly traded parent company of NameSilo LLC on the Canadian Securities Exchange.

In January 2019, NameSilo LLC expanded through acquisition with the purchase of NamePal.com, LLC, an ICANN-accredited domain registrar and web services provider known for its proprietary domain backorder service. Under the terms of the purchase agreement, NameSilo acquired 100% of the membership interests in NamePal, and certain equity interests were reallocated as part of the transaction. The acquisition was intended to broaden NameSilo’s product offerings and technical capabilities and to expand its technology and customer support teams.

In August 2025, NameSilo Technologies Corp. announced that its subsidiary NameSilo LLC had acquired the link-shortening platform ShortURL, along with related board appointments and equity grants.

In November 2025, the company entered a letter of intent to acquire 100% of Reach Systems Inc., a technology company based in Nanaimo, British Columbia.

== Partnerships ==
In December 2019, NameSilo announced a partnership with NuSEC to provide premium DNS services focused on improved security and performance.

== Awards ==
- NamePros Registrar of the Year (2019)
