= .hiv =

Internet top-level domain

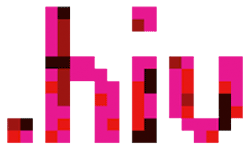
- Introduced: August 2014 (general public)
- TLD type: Generic top-level domain (gTLD)
- Status: Active
- Registry: Uniregistry
- Intended use: HIV/AIDS awareness
- Registration restrictions: None
- Registry website: https://nic.hiv/

.hiv is a generic top-level domain (gTLD) proposed by the Berlin-based nonprofit dotHIV and owned by Uniregistry as of September 2014. It is the first open charitable gTLD and its ICANN designation states that the domain's operator is precluded from making a profit. Funds raised from .hiv domain sales will initially benefit projects to increase access to HIV/AIDS treatment in Rwanda, South Africa, Turkey, and the United States.

== History ==
.hiv has been called the "red ribbon for the digital age", referring to the awareness ribbon.

The top-level domain (TLD) was inspired by an anti-HIV/AIDS campaign by thjnk, a German advertising agency. A group of co-founders, including charity-experienced Carolin Silbernagl, thjnk's co-owner Michael Trautmann and creative director Philipp Kafkoulas, established dotHIV gemeinnütziger e.V. as a charitable association and applied for the .hiv TLD. Despite the global relevance of HIV/AIDS, dotHIV was the only applicant for the .hiv TLD. The charity signed a registration contract with ICANN in March 2014. Domains were made available for select companies and individuals during the July "sunrise" period, becoming generally available in August 2014. hiv became the first open charitable TLD and, according to one press release, "opens up a dedicated namespace that brings website owners together behind one goal: The end of AIDS".

In September 2015, dotHIV and Cayman Islands-based domain company Uniregistry jointly announced Uniregistry's acquisition of .hiv and accompanying plan to complete the change in ownership before World AIDS Day on December 1, 2015. One announcement read, "Today, Uniregistry takes over the lead in this unique journey to use a top-level domain to promote a social good. The dotHIV charity will continue its work for .hiv and focus on community support. The creative agency thjnk from Hamburg, Germany, longstanding partner of the initiative, will continue to work on behalf of the .hiv top-level domain, exploring new and existing opportunities for social change."

Uniregistry's acquisition of .hiv came after a planned auction for the gTLD was cancelled when no companies signed up to participate. The cancelled auction's reserve price had been $200,000. The price ultimately paid by Uniregistry in the private deal was not publicly disclosed.

== Model and donation recipients ==
The contract for .hiv with ICANN does not allow the extension operator to make a profit on the TLD. Before Uniregistry took over, visits to .hiv domains (even redirected ones) generated small donations of approximately one-tenth of a cent, made from dotHIV's general fund to a project fund. The company's general fund was the result of .hiv domain sales, which retailed for 150 euros. dotHIV hoped to direct 70 percent of its income from domain sales to the general fund. Domain sales also funded dotHIV's operations and the debt required to finance the .hiv application process and subsequent launch. According to Slate, dotHIV planned to reimburse "zero- or low-interest loans provided by business angels and the technology development fund of the city-state of Berlin that have allowed the charity to operate so far". Nonprofit organizations in the HIV/AIDS field are eligible to receive .hiv domains at no cost.

.hiv's launch has been called "one of the strangest and riskiest business models of any new gTLD to date". Uniregistry has said it will continue to operate the extension using the same model as dotHIV for the immediate future.

dotHIV identified four initial projects to support; they are located in Rwanda (We-ActsX), South Africa, Turkey, and the United States, and focus on patient access to HIV/AIDS treatment. The company intended to let .hiv domain owners vote on which projects to support in the future.

== Domains ==
In 2014, Trautmann announced that 10,000 requests for .hiv domains were made (which would result in US$200 million in annual income if all domains were sold and purchased at the 150 euro price). Bono's Product Red organization was the first .hiv domain launched during the extension's "sunrise" period in July 2014. Amazon.com, BMW, Gilead Sciences, Instagram, LinkedIn, Paulaner Brewery, Plus.de, POZ, Samsung, Sixt, TED, Tumblr, and Wired have also purchased .hiv domains. In April 2014, when dotHIV put its contract with ICANN up for auction, there were 345 paid registrations generating $83,000 in revenue. According to Domain Name Wire, there were 500 .hiv registrations in the zone file in September 2015.

== Reception ==
Prior to .hiv's transition to Uniregistry, Slate's Marc Naimark contrasted the gTLD with the Product Red campaign. He was more critical of the latter, saying it "reinforces consumerism" and functions more as a public relations strategy for participating brands. He wrote:

Reaching the coffee chain's website by using starbucks.hiv does not provide quite the same visibility for consumers as (RED) products, since it lacks the public broadcasting tote-bag effect. But dotHIV does offer real benefits in terms of action. The money is already in the bank, thanks to the sale of .hiv domains. The projects benefiting from the funding are small in scale and are clearly indicated on the dotHIV website. As operations continue, the outcomes of these specific projects will become clearer than those offered by the bulk funding of the Global Fund. Companies can use their .hiv domain as a landing page to provide further information. And nonprofits will benefit from a free domain name to showcase their actions in the fight against HIV/AIDS. Because funds are released only when .hiv websites are visited, all website owners have an incentive to promote their .hiv domain names, enhancing the 'red ribbon' effect.
