= .realtor =

Internet top-level domain

- Introduced: 2014
- TLD type: Generic top-level domain
- Registry: Real Estate Domains LLC
- Sponsor: Real Estate Domains LLC
- Intended use: For real estate brokers part of the National Association of Realtors or the Canadian Real Estate Association
- Actual use: Realty-related websites
- Registered domains: 88,477 (December 7th, 2014)
- Registration restrictions: Domains may only be registered by members of the National Association of Realtors or the Canadian Real Estate Association
- Structure: Registrations at second level
- DNSSEC: yes
- Registry website: get.realtor

.realtor is an active generic top-level domain (gTLD) intended for real estate brokers who are members of the National Association of Realtors or the Canadian Real Estate Association. The registry for .realtor is run by Real Estate Domains (RED). The sole registrar of .realtor domains is Real Estate Domains LLC.

== See also ==
- National Association of Realtors
- Realtor.com
- Real property
