= .inc =

Internet top-level domain

- TLD type: Generic top-level domain
- Status: Active
- Sponsor: Intercap Registry Inc
- Registered domains: 3,605 (June 2020)
- DNSSEC: Yes
- Registry website: https://get.inc/

The domain name .inc is a top-level domain (TLD) in the Domain Name System of the Internet. It is operated by Intercap Registry Inc., a Cayman Islands company.
