= .kosher =

Internet top-level domain

- Introduced: January 14, 2014
- TLD type: Generic top-level domain
- Registry: OK Kosher Certification
- Intended use: Promotion of kosher foods, kosher certification, and OK Kosher Certification

.kosher is a generic top-level domain owned by OK Kosher Certification. The filing of the application for the domain in January 2012 began a two-year process during which eleven other kosher certification agencies filed official objections, arguing that granting the application would give OK Kosher an unfair competitive advantage. In January 2014, ICANN ruled that OK Kosher could begin using the .kosher domain, after which the eleven objectors filed for reconsideration.

== History ==
=== Application ===
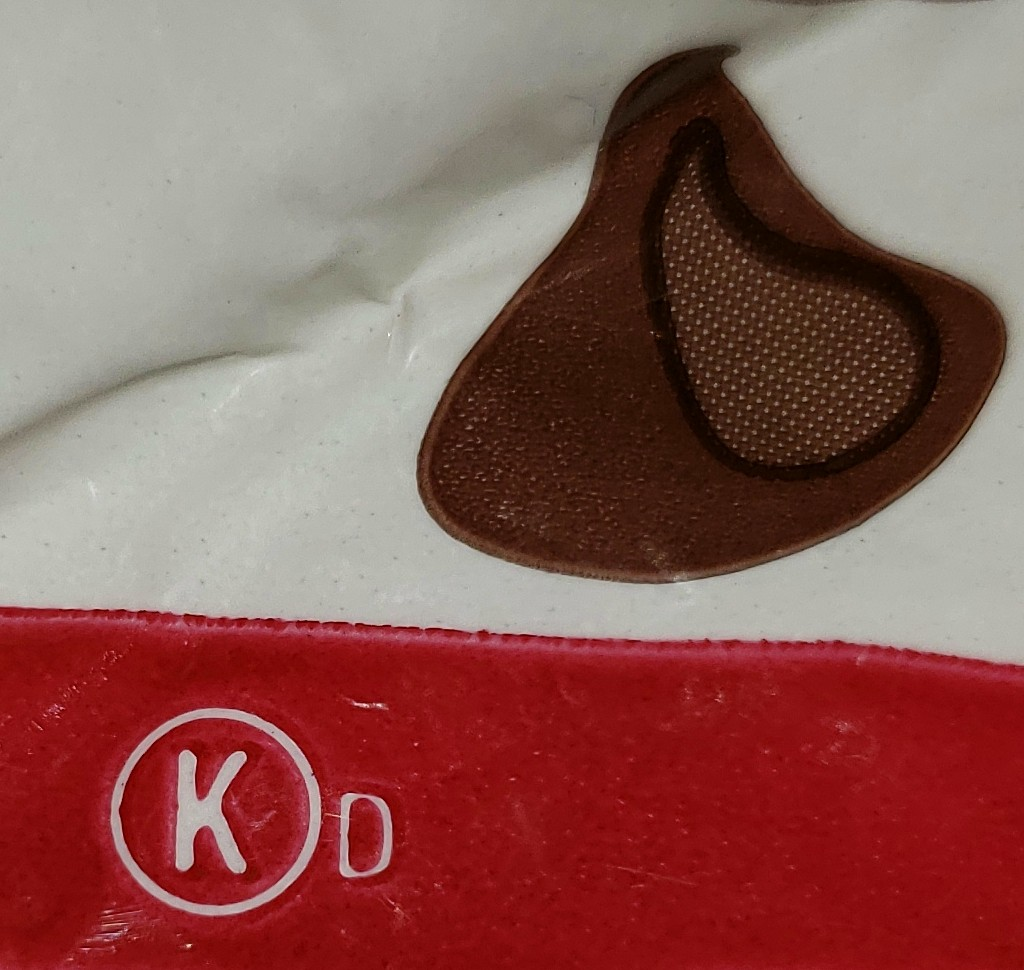
OK Kosher Certification symbol, seen on a bag of chocolate chips

In January 2012, after beginning to accept applications for the creation of new generic top-level domains, ICANN received 1,930 applications for domains. One of these was an application for the domain ".kosher" by OK Kosher Certification. Filed by Kosher Marketing Assets LLC, the application stated that the company would promote the domain "through press releases and direct communications with customers of OK Kosher Certification."

=== Objections ===
In response to the application, eleven other kosher certification agencies filed official objections, including the Orthodox Union (which has the largest kosher certification agency) as well as Star-K, Chicago Rabbinical Council, Kosher Supervision Service, and Kashruth Council of Canada. These objecting agencies argued that OK Kosher would gain an unfair competitive advantage by owning the domain, and that the word "kosher" should not be owned. OK Kosher stated that it had 45 groups supporting its application, including the Chief Rabbis of Russia and South Africa. OK Kosher chief executive officer Don Yoel Levy said that the company purchased the domain "to make sure it fell into the right hands" and was willing to allow its use by others, while the chief executive officer of the Orthodox Union kosher certification agency stated that OK Kosher had offered them an unequal partnership.

In the same time period as the .kosher application, ICANN declined an application for .halal, citing the sensitivity of issues related to religion. The objecting organizations pointed out the different treatments of .halal and .kosher, stating that the objection to .halal was valid and that .kosher should have been treated in the same manner.

=== Implementation ===
An expert from the International Chamber of Commerce found that the objections to OK Kosher's application were not supported by the circumstances. On January 14, 2014, the rights to the .kosher domain were granted to Kosher Marketing Assets LLC, a subsidiary of OK Kosher.

After the rights were granted, OK Kosher's public relations director expressed satisfaction with the decision and said it was "a little bit too early for [OK Kosher] to know" how the domain would be used. He stated that OK Kosher wanted the domain to be open to "other people who adhere to the Torah standards of kosher."

The eleven objectors filed for reconsideration of the decision. The chief executive officer of Orthodox Union's kosher certification agency stated that "we and our friends and colleagues who joined with us in this objection will all survive very well even if we lose," while expressing confidence in their argument for reconsideration. As of 2014, this is unresolved.
