= Frank Schilling =

Canadian-Caymanian internet investor

Frank T. Schilling
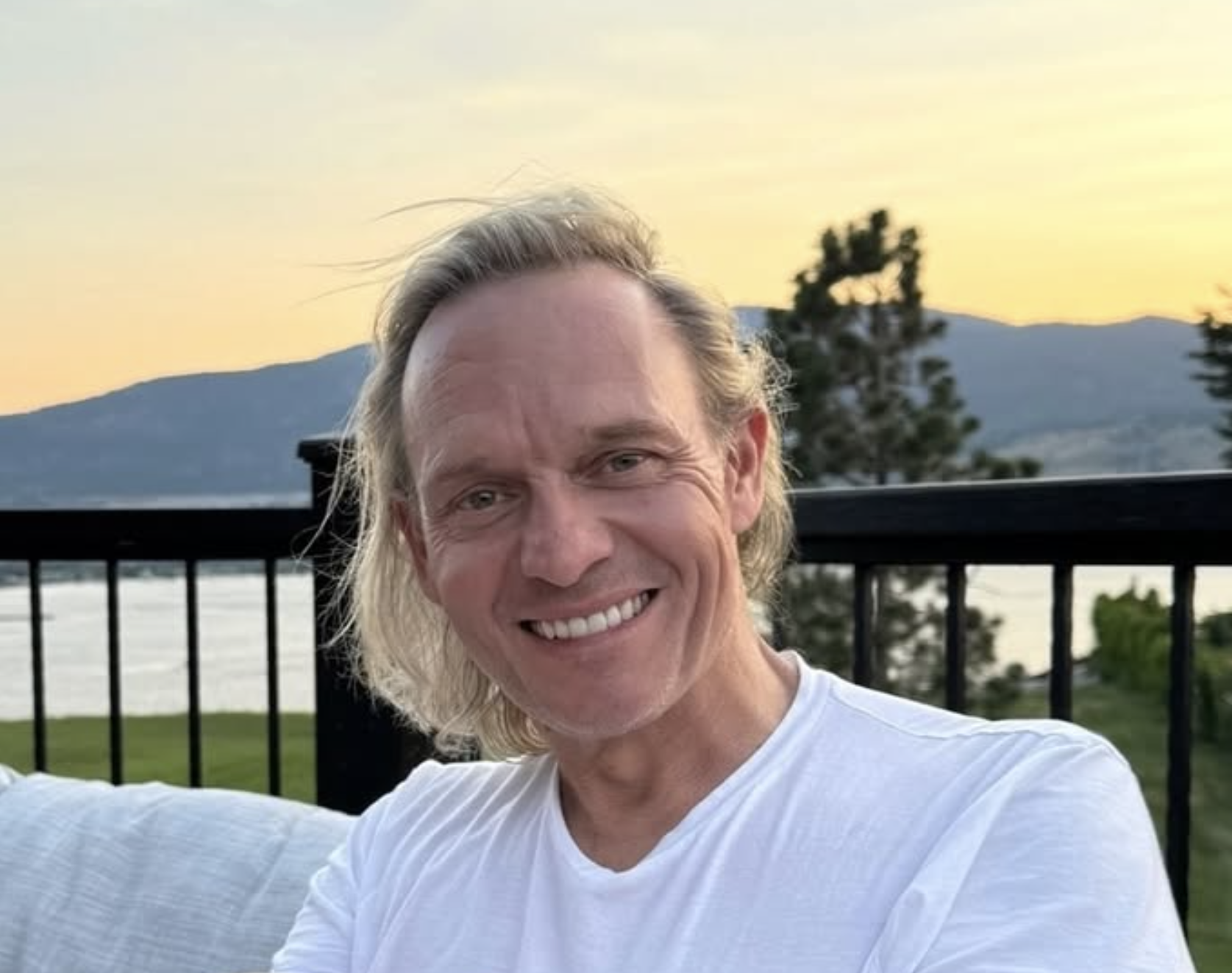
- Born: Frank Taylor Schilling; July 29, 1969 (age 57); Tübingen, Baden-Württemberg, West Germany
- Occupations: Entrepreneur, Investor
- Writing career
- Notable work: Uniregistry

Frank T. Schilling (born July 29, 1969) is a Canadian and Caymanian entrepreneur. Born in Germany, Schilling grew up in Canada and moved to the Cayman Islands c. 2003.

== Career ==
=== Domain Name Industry ===
As the founder of the Name Administration Inc. and Uniregistry, Schilling managed over five million domain names and the domain name registrar and aftermarket sales platform. In 2019, Uniregistry became a top 10 registrar of domain names across new GTLDs and existing CCTLDs. His registry services platform operated and provided back-end registry services to more than 30 top level domain names.

In 2003, Schilling financed the Caribbean's first ICANN accredited domain name registrar. He joined as a member of the ICANN business constituency and co-founded the non-profit Internet Commerce Association in 2006.

On February 11, 2020, GoDaddy announced that it had acquired the assets of Name Administration Inc. as well as the Uniregistry registrar, its secondary marketplace, and Uniregistry investments in New York-based Brandsight.com for an undisclosed sum.

=== Creative Ventures ===
Following his exit from the domain name industry, Schilling pursued new ventures. He is an active angel investor whose fund has investments in Triller, Desktop.com, and ZoomProp.

Schilling formed GoldFYR Records, an independent music record label with partners Yannick "Vasco Got the Recipe" Powell, and Rico Rolando. GoldFYR endeavored to empower young music artists who would otherwise not have had a voice. R&B and hip hop musicians including Rico Rolando, Lonney Love, and Teodoro 'Teö' were signed to the label and are still growing their music catalogs today.

On June 23, 2021, it was announced that Schilling is the developer behind Port Zeus, the first man-made safe harbor in the Cayman Islands on the island of Cayman Brac.

In 2022, Schilling co-published an independent novel with best-selling economist Andrei Polgar titled Omnia Vincit: The Universe Wants You To Win. This novel touches on the beliefs that shaped his "rags to riches" journey and the lessons that transitioned his pursuit of financial gain toward goals centered in meaning and purpose - and how both intersect.

In the Summer of 2023, Schilling opened Mykonos Steak Club, a celebratory dining destination in the heart of Seven Mile Beach. He is also the founder of Aphrodise, a Greek sparkling rosé.

Schilling commissioned metalworking artist Kevin Stone to sculpt 'Alice,' a 17,000 pound handmade steel Tyrannosaurus rex sculpture, in the city of Penticton in British Columbia to honor his Canadian roots and the Okanagan Valley.

Schilling plays with himself and his various business interests are presented in Season 1 of the Hulu and Freeform series Grand Cayman: Secrets in Paradise.

== Personal life ==
Schilling has four children.
