= .cyou =

Top-level domain

- Introduced: March 31, 2015; 11 years ago
- TLD type: Generic top-level domain
- Status: Active
- Sponsor: ShortDot SA, Luxembourg
- Registered domains: 89,288 (June 2026)
- Registration restrictions: Public registrations available
- DNSSEC: Yes

The domain name .cyou is a generic top-level domain (gTLD) in the Domain Name System of the Internet. Added in March 2015, this name is marketed as the phrase "see you."

According to Internet Assigned Numbers Authority (IANA) published reports, this domain name was initially delegated to Beijing Gamease Age Digital Technology Co., Ltd., a Beijing company, on March 31, 2015. It was transferred to ShortDot SA, a Luxembourgish company, on May 14, 2020.
