= .med =

Top-level domain

.med is a top-level domain for the internet, launched on 3 December 2015, intended for websites related to medicine. Med like all the other top-level domain needs to be delegated to an organization.

Google and the Cleveland Clinic both submitted applications to control this top-level domain, but both were rejected after objections by the International Chamber of Commerce in 2014. The decision against Cleveland Clinic's application was reversed later that same year.

In 2015, the application of Medistry LLC, a subsidiary of Second Generation Ltd, was accepted.

== Other uses ==
.med is also a filename extension linked to the Salome platform, a numerical simulation tool.

== See also ==
- Proposed top-level domain
- List of Internet top-level domains
