= .earth =

Generic top-level domain

- Introduced: May 12, 2015; 11 years ago
- TLD type: Generic top-level domain
- Status: Active
- Sponsor: Interlink
- Registered domains: 38,390 (January 2024)
- Registration restrictions: Public registrations available
- DNSSEC: Yes
- Registry website: https://domain.earth/

.earth is a generic top-level domain (gTLD) in the Domain Name System of the internet. It was delegated to Interlink on 12 May 2015.
