= Public Interest Registry =

Company that manages the ".org" domain

- Type: 501(c)(3) corporation
- Industry: Internet, Domain registry
- Founded: 2002 in Reston, Virginia
- Founder: Lynn St. Amour, Hal Lubsen, Ram Mohan, David Maher
- Headquarters: Reston, Virginia
- Key people: Jon Nevett, Judy Song-Marshall, Brian Cimbolic, Elizabeth Szabo, Tim Switzer
- Parent: Internet Society
- Website: pir.org

Public Interest Registry is a not-for-profit 501(c)(3) corporation based in Reston, Virginia, created by the Internet Society in 2002 to manage the .ORG top-level domain. It took over operation of .ORG in January 2003 and launched the .NGO and .ONG top-level domains in March 2015.

In November 2019, it was announced that the Internet Society intended to sell the Public Interest Registry to the private equity investment firm Ethos Capital for 1.135 billion USD. Following concerns raised by the attorney general of California, ICANN decided to reject the sale in April 2020.

== Domains ==
=== .ORG ===
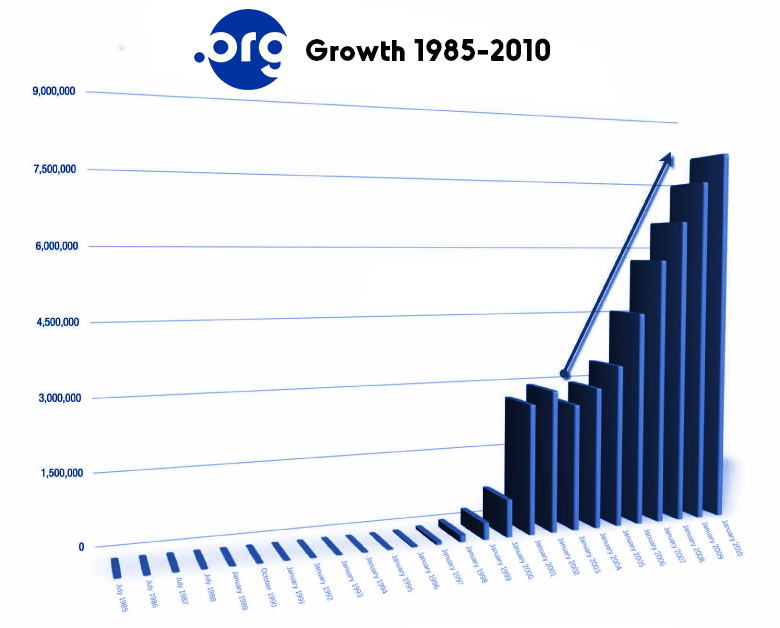
The number of .ORG domains registered with the Public Interest Registry

.ORG is the third largest generic top-level domain of the Domain Name System used in the internet. .ORG domains have been registered by Public Interest Registry since 2003. Craigslist.org and Wikipedia.org are among the more popular .org users. Since 2009, Public Interest Registry has published a bi-annual report called "The Dashboard" on the number of registered .ORG domains. There were more than 8 million registered .ORG in 2009, 8.8 million in 2010, and 9.6 million in 2011. Public Interest Registry registered the ten millionth .org domain in June, 2012. In June 2015 there were 10.5 million .org domains registered. As of 2026, there are more than 12 million .ORG domains registered.

Public Interest Registry promotes and publicizes the .ORG domain. While .ORG is an open domain, Public Interest Registry wants more people to view .ORG as a domain for communities and entities that serve the public good, rather than being perceived as directed to non-profits. In 2010, Public Interest Registry launched "WhyIChose.org" as part of a campaign to promote the .ORG domain extension.

It conducted a survey of consumers in 2011 on how domain names are perceived by internet users. The survey found that 81 percent of Americans still rely on an organization's website before Twitter or Facebook. It also suggested .ORG sites were seen as more trustworthy. Respondents were more likely to turn to .ORG websites in a crisis, more likely to post content on .ORG sites and to trust information on a .ORG domain. It also found that younger age groups were almost twice as likely to register a .ORG as Americans age 55-64.

In July 2015, Public Interest Registry marked the 30th anniversary of the first .ORG registration, and launched a website featuring a timeline of .ORG registrations from 1985 to 2015 and a gallery of .ORG websites. The first .ORG domain name to be registered was mitre.org.

=== .NGO and .ONG ===
In June 2011, ICANN expanded the internet's naming system to allow applications for new top-level domain names. Public Interest Registry declared publicly an interest in the .NGO domain (NGO standing for non-governmental organization) in August 2011 and applied for it in May 2012. It also applied for an equivalent domain, .ONG, which stands for Organisation Non Gouvernementale in French, and is also recognizable in Portuguese, Spanish, Italian and other Romance languages.

Unlike the .ORG domain, .NGO will require validation of the registrant's non-governmental status. Non-governmental organizations told Public Interest Registry they needed a closed domain that validated the legitimacy of websites accepting online donations to avoid fraud. Public Interest Registry plans to use the funds from selling .NGO domains to develop an "NGO Community Program" to reach out to NGOs in developing nations. It also intends to create a directory service of NGOs to support their SEO and visibility, and develop a closed community for NGOs to learn from each other. The new domains have been publicly available since May 6, 2015.

== Policy initiatives ==
=== DNS abuse institute ===
In 2021, PIR announced the establishment of the Domain Name Abuse Institute as part of its ongoing efforts to protect Internet users from the threat of DNS abuse such as malware, botnets, phishing, pharming, and spam. PIR said the Institute will bring together leaders in the anti-abuse space to fund research, publish recommended practices, share data, and provide tools to identify and report DNS Abuse. Graeme Bunton, who has more than a decade of experience working in the DNS and DNS Abuse policy, was named to serve as the DNS Abuse Institute’s inaugural director. In April 2022, it signaled the coming release of an industry tool to report DNS abuse. The tool, named NetBeacon, was slated to be formally introduced in the summer of 2022.

=== Quality Performance Index initiative ===
Two years prior to the establishment of the DNS Abuse Institute, PIR in 2019 created an incentive program with domain registrars to combat DNS abuse and improve the quality of the .ORG domain space. PIR claimed that improving the quality of the domains registered led to higher renewal rates for expiring domain names (a key financial goal for registrars). The program gave registrars tools and best practices to improve the quality of .ORG domains registered and then created a scorecard "Quality Performance Index," or QPI, to measure the results. Among the indicators measured included abuse ratings, renewal rates, domain usage, DNSSEC enablement, SSL encryption usage, and the average term life of a domain name registration. In 2021, PIR, saying the program had been successful improving the quality of. the .Org domain space, offered QPI tools and measurement kit free to all registries and registrars across all domains.

=== Domain tasting ===
Public Interest Registry reduced domain tasting by charging fees to registrars that cancel 90 percent of their domains in less than five days. In 2007, ICANN used that as a model for a similar proposal to curb domain tasting through non-refundable fees. Public Interest Registry supported ICANN's expansion of top-level domain names. CEO Brian Cute commented that internet users will still gravitate towards established domain names, but new domains will target specific communities. Public Interest Registry has also urged ICANN to address privacy implications of the WHOIS database. The organization is critical of the security of DNS filtering techniques and supports the DNSSEC protocol. It also shuts down .org-based phishing scams.

== .ORG Impact Awards ==
PIR holds an annual awards program to "recognize and reward outstanding mission-driven individuals and organizations from the global .ORG Community for their positive contributions to society." Since 2019, the .ORG Impact Awards have recognized more than 120 outstanding .ORGs across more than 40 countries, with prize donations totaling $220,000.

Previous .ORG of the Year recipients include ADES, which produces solar cookers in Madagascar, thus encouraging the use of renewable energy, Days for Girls International, aiming to advance menstrual equity, health, and education, and World Refugees School, a school aiming to leverage technology to provide education to children in a scalable and potentially more affordable way.

PIR intends to recognize 2022 awardees in the following categories: Health and Healing, Quality Education for All, Diversity, Equity, and Inclusion, Environmental Stewardship, Hunger and Poverty, Community Building, Rising Star, and .ORG of the Year.

== History ==
The Domain Name System was created in 1983 to create a more stable and redundant network of networks and to make the internet simpler for more people to use.

.ORG was one of the original top-level domains (along with .COM, .EDU, .MIL, and .GOV) that launched a year later in 1984. .ORG was intended to be the home for organizations of a non-commercial character that did not meet the requirements for the other top-level domains.

From 1984 to 1992, .ORG was managed by the Stanford Research Institute under a grant from the United States government. At this time, .ORG domain names were issued free of charge upon request.

In 1993, the operations of .ORG were privatized and transferred from the Stanford Research Institute to Network Solutions – the single-bidder for further developing the domain name registration service for the internet – under a five-year agreement with the National Science Foundation. Network Solutions charged $100 per .ORG domain name for a two-year registration, a rate that was subsequently lowered to $70 following a 1997 lawsuit charging Network Solutions with antitrust violations.

In 1998, the United States Department of Commerce issued the white paper that resulted in the formation of the Internet Corporation for Assigned Names and Numbers (ICANN). One early decision that ICANN made was to create a vertical separation of registries (the party that manages the underlying database of domain names) and registrars (the party that acts as a retail provider of domain names).

The creation of ICANN brought some competition to the domain name industry when new generic top-level domains like .BIZ, .INFO, and .MUSEUM launched in 2001. Network Solutions, however, retained its monopoly over .ORG, as well as .COM and .NET. Network Solutions was acquired by Verisign in 2000.

In 2001, to keep .COM and .NET (the most financially lucrative of the legacy top-level domains), Verisign voluntarily agreed to surrender its control of .ORG by 2003. At the time, ICANN stated that transferring .ORG away from Verisign and to a new, purpose-built registry would “return the .ORG registry to its original purpose,” and enable .ORG to return “to its originally intended function as a registry operated by and for non-profit organizations.”

Furthermore, article 5.1.4 of the 2001 .ORG Registry Agreement between ICANN and Verisign required that Verisign "pay to ICANN or ICANN’s designee the sum of US $5 million, to be used by ICANN in it [sic] sole discretion to establish an endowment to be used to fund future operating costs of the non-profit entity designated by ICANN as successor operator of the .ORG registry."

The criteria for re-assigning .ORG included:

- Criterion 4 (differentiation): "A key objective is differentiation of the .ORG TLD from TLDs intended for commercial purposes. … Proposals should include detailed planned marketing practices designed to … promote and attract registrations from the global noncommercial community."
- Criterion 5 (responsiveness to the noncommercial community): “The successor operator’s policies and practices should strive to be responsive to and supportive of the noncommercial Internet user community” and "Where representative governing or advisory groups are proposed, the proposal should ensure a mechanism for providing all .org registrants with the opportunity to participate in that mechanism, either through the selection of members, or through some other means. The bylaws or other documents establishing the groups should provide explicitly for an open, transparent, and participatory process by which .org operating policies are initiated, reviewed, and revised in a manner that reflects the interests of .org domain name holders and is consistent with the terms of its registry agreement with ICANN."
- Criterion 6 (public support among noncommercial users): "Demonstrated support among registrants in the .ORG TLD, particularly those actually using .ORG domain names for noncommercial purposes" and
- Criterion 7 (affordability): "In view of the noncommercial character of many present and future .ORG registrants, affordability is important. A significant consideration will be the price at which the proposal commits to provide initial and renewal registrations."

In 2002, the Internet Society was in a dire financial position. There were significant concerns that the Internet Society’s financial position could sink .ORG. Hal Lubsen, the CEO and Ram Mohan, the CTO of Afilias, a domain name registry operator, approached Lynn St. Amour, the CEO of The Internet Society with a proposal to partner with The Internet Society to bid for the .ORG TLD, in a model where The Internet Society would remain the steward of the .ORG name, and Afilias would take charge of all operational and technical functions related to .ORG. After a long deliberation, the Internet Society's Board in 2002, agreed to the partnership between the two organizations. To ensure separation of .ORG from The Internet Society's own issues, the Internet Society proposed creating the Public Interest Registry as a separate 501(c)3 non-profit to manage .ORG and to insulate it from the Internet Society. The Public Interest Registry was established with a membership of one, the Internet Society, governed by a separate board.

Eleven bids for .ORG were received from operators who were assessed as being qualified to manage the registry.

The Internet Society was among the 11 bidders. Presenting to the ICANN Board at its 2002 Budapest meeting were The Internet Society's CEO Lynn St.Amour and Afilias' CTO Ram Mohan. Though the Internet Society did not receive the absolute highest score out of the 11 bids, as assessed by independent and staff evaluators, it was nonetheless awarded a perpetual contract to manage .ORG. Articles 4.1 and 4.2 of the .ORG Registry Agreement outline that, provided there have not been breaches of payment obligations to ICANN and there have not been three or more “fundamental and material breach[es]” of the contract, the contract will automatically renew for a further 10 years – in perpetuity. The reason for awarding the contract to the Internet Society included the Internet Society’s global membership, important mission, and non-profit status and Afilias' technical prowess.

The decision made by the ICANN Board to allocate .ORG to the Internet Society was consistent with RFC 1591, which states that “a designated manager for a domain” is a “trustee for the delegated domain, and ha[s] a duty to serve the community.”

The community that .ORG was intended to serve is non-profit organizations, and Lynn St. Amour, who was then President and CEO of the Internet Society, committed the Internet Society to working to ensure that the non-governmental sector shaped any decisions affecting the .ORG ecosystem.

Afilias was designated the back-end technical provider for .ORG under contract with the Public Interest Registry. Afilias CTO Ram Mohan effectively became the CTO for .ORG and PIR, a stewardship role that was maintained until PIR matured sufficiently to have its own CTO. The then-largest domain transfer in history occurred on January 1, 2003, when ICANN had VeriSign delegate 2.6 million domains to Public Interest Registry. An Internet Society Vice President, David Maher, became the chairman. The following month, Ed Viltz became the organization's first CEO.

Marc Rotenberg, the founding Board Chair of the Public Interest Registry, stated in an op-ed that when the Public Interest Registry was established, “our aim was to promote the non-commercial use of the internet … We believed there should be a space of the Internet to promote non-commercial use and that the governance of the .ORG domain should respect the essential character of the users of the domain.”

On June 23, 2010, Public Interest Registry's technology provider Afilias implemented the Domain Name System Security Extensions (DNSSEC) protocol for .ORG, making .ORG the first open gTLD to sign its zone. DNSSEC is intended to prevent cache poisoning attacks by making sure internet users arrive at the URL they intended. The implementation began in test environments in mid-2009. The protocol was implemented by Public Interest Registry's technical partner Afilias during the tenure of former CEO Alexa Raad, who played a role in creating the DNSSEC Industry Coalition. Raad resigned from Public Interest Registry in late 2010. The non-profit had an interim CEO, until it recruited former Afilias executive Brian Cute as its third chief executive officer on January 14, 2011. After a successful tenure, Brian Cute stepped down as CEO in May 2018.

After the 2011 Tōhoku earthquake and tsunami, Public Interest Registry waived renewal fees for Japan-based .org domains to prevent them from expiring due to intermittent internet access.

=== Attempted commercialization ===
In 2017, PIR renegotiated their agreement with Afilias to manage their registrations, reducing their overhead. In November 2020, Afilias was purchased by Donuts. On 17 December 2018, former Donuts co-founder Jon Nevett became CEO of the Public Interest Registry. On 13 May 2019, ICANN announced that they would remove the price cap on .ORG registrations.

On 13 November 2019 the Internet Society announced that it was selling the Public Interest Registry to Ethos Capital, including its holdings of Registry Agreements. Following concerns about the elimination of price caps, Ethos Capital stated on their website, "Our plan is to live within the spirit of historic practice when it comes to pricing," which they later clarified to mean raising prices by an average of 10% per year. This is the maximum that the Public Interest Registry was allowed to raise prices starting in 2016, though it never chose to do so.

In January 2020 a new entity named the "Cooperative Corporation of .ORG Registrants" was incorporated, to oppose the sale of the registry and to potentially take over the role of registry from PIR.

The sale led to concern over PIR's transition to a for-profit venture, especially in view of the removal of price caps on .org registrations. People who came out in opposition to the sale included Tim Berners-Lee and Marc Rotenberg, the first chair of the Public Interest Registry, as well as previous Trustees along with the first Executive Director of the Internet Society. On 22 November 2019 NTEN launched the website savedotorg.org for organizations and others to express their opposition to the sale. Over 25,000 people signed a petition opposing the sale, and a demonstration was held outside ICANN's office in Los Angeles in January 2020. On 29 November 2019, it was revealed that the purchase price is $1.135 billion.

In late January 2020, ICANN halted its final approval of the sale after the attorney general of California requested detailed documentation from all parties, citing concerns that both ICANN and the Internet Society had potentially violated their public interest missions as registered charities subject to the laws of California. In February, the Internet Society's Chapter Advisory Council (which represents its membership) began the process to adopt a motion rejecting the sale if certain conditions were not complied with.

On 30 April 2020, the ICANN Board, saying it was "the right thing to do," withheld its consent to the transfer of control of the Public Internet Registry to Ethos Capital, effectively killing the proposed deal.
