= Uniregistry =

Domain name registrar

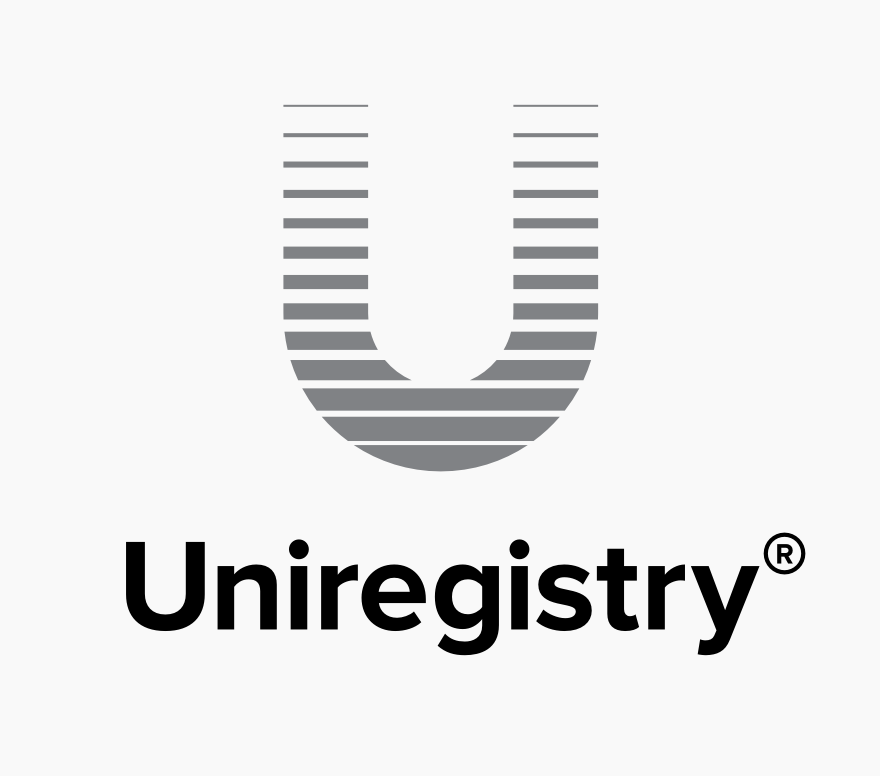
- Industry: Internet
- Founded: 2012; 14 years ago
- Founder: Frank Schilling
- Headquarters: Governors Square, Unit 3-110; PO Box 1361; Grand Cayman KY1-1108, Cayman Islands
- Number of locations: 2: Newport Beach, California: 2161 San Joaquin Hills Road, Newport Beach, California 92660-6507 United States of America
- Products: § Top-level domains
- Owner: GoDaddy
- Website: uniregistry.com (registrar); uniregistry.link (registry)

Uniregistry is a large retail domain name registrar and web services provider; as well as a domain name registry that administers generic top-level domains. In February 2013, the related company Uniregistrar Corporation became an ICANN-accredited registrar and launched under the licensed Uniregistry brand name in 2014. Uniregistry's acquisition by GoDaddy was announced in February 2020.

== History ==
Uniregistry Corporation was officially founded in 2012 by Frank Schilling, one of the largest private domain name portfolio owners in the world, and was registered in the Cayman Islands. However, the domain Uniregistry.com was registered six years earlier and the company filed an intent to use the name in the Cayman Islands in 2010. Trademark applications for the "Uniregistry" mark and its stylized "U" logo were filed in 2012. That year, Schilling invested $60 million and applied for 54 new top-level domains. Uniregistrar Corporation became an ICANN-accredited registrar in February 2013. In January 2014, Uniregistry Inc. became a subsidiary in Newport Beach, California to house a West Coast service and support team. The registrar began operating under the licensed Uniregistry brand name in 2014. Uniregistry's registry infrastructure was designed by Internet Systems Consortium (ISC) and Uniregistry subsequently purchased its infrastructure in 2013.

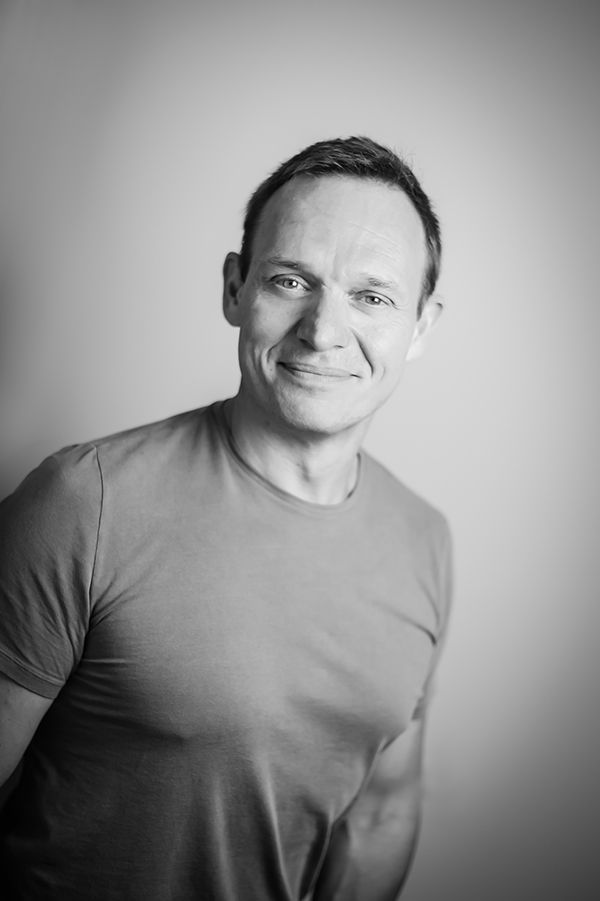
Founder Frank Schilling

In February 2014, the company launched its first two top-level domains, .sexy and.tattoo. That same month, Uniregistry reached a private agreement with Donuts whereby Uniregistry would own the extensions.audio and.juegos ("games", in Spanish) and Donuts would own.auction, .furniture, and.gratis. Uniregistry won.click, .hosting, and.property in April 2014. The company launched the top-level domains.audio, .hiphop, and .juegos in September 2014. It acquired .flowers for an undisclosed amount that same month, beating out Donuts, Minds + Machines, and 1-800-Flowers. In November 2014, the registrar began accepting the cryptocurrency Topcoin to pay for domain name registrations, inbound transfers, and renewals across its extensions; it was discontinued in 2018. The company released .click, .diet, .help, .hosting, and .property during the Thanksgiving holiday week in 2014.

Uniregistry acquired .lol in January 2015, .mom in March, and .game in May 2015. Uniregistry launched .photo and .pics in April. In May 2015, the company and XYZ announced their joint operation of Cars Registry Limited, a company that would operate three top-level domains related to the automotive industry: .auto, .car, and .cars. Uniregistry had won .auto and .cars in 2014, while XYZ acquired .car from Google for an undisclosed amount in 2015. The company launched a new version of its registry website in August 2015. In September 2015, Uniregistry agreed to take over management of the extension .hiv and continue fundraising and raising awareness of HIV/AIDS. .hiv became the first open charitable top-level domain in 2014. Schilling has said of the extension:

By assuming the registry operations of .hiv, we are taking our core skills and putting them at the service of one of the most urgent challenges of humankind. The United Nations has reconfirmed the opportunities to end the global AIDS epidemic within our lifetime. At Uniregistry, we want to be a part of this ambitious endeavor. Of course, Uniregistry is a for-profit company. But with .hiv, we act as a social enterprise. It is the social mission that will guide the operation of this special TLD.

Uniregistry has been the lead sponsor for NamesCon, the domain name industry's largest conference, for at least three years.

== Top-level domains ==
Uniregistry is the domain name registry for the following generic top-level domains:

- .audio, launched September 3, 2014
- .auto
- .blackfriday, launched July 8, 2014
- .car
- .cars
- .Christmas, launched July 8, 2014
- .click, launched November 25, 2014
- .diet, launched November 25, 2014
- .flowers, launched April 7, 2015
- .game, launched May 17, 2016
- .gift, launched April 15, 2014
- .guitars, launched April 15, 2014
- .help, launched November 25, 2014
- .hiphop, launched September 3, 2014
- .hiv
- .hosting, launched November 25, 2014
- .juegos, launched September 3, 2014
- .link, launched April 15, 2014
- .lol, launched August 11, 2015
- .mom
- .photo, launched April 15, 2014
- .pics, launched April 15, 2014
- .property, launched November 25, 2014
- .sexy, launched February 25, 2014
- .tattoo, launched February 25, 2014

More than 17,200 .audio domains had been registered as of September 2014, although 16,000 of these were short domain names registered by Schilling's own North Sound Names (NSN). NSN is a subsidiary of Uniregistry Corporation that sells the premium names in Uniregistry's top-level domains direct to consumers. It also sells the domain names it manages through the Uniregistry Market, which launched on June 16, 2015. The Uniregistry Market EPP extension is available to all Uniregistry-accredited registrars. As of September 24, 2014, more than 10,800 .blackfriday domains were registered, with 400 registered within the first day of general availability. NSN registered 10,000 .blackfriday domains in September 2014, along with 5,000 .hiphop domains. 500 .hiphop domains were registered prior to NSN's large purchase. 400 non-Uniregistry .Christmas domains were registered on its first day of general availability. More than 10,000 .click domains were registered on the first day of general availability (outlets initially reported 3,800 registrations, but Schilling confirmed the higher figure). Uniregistry only held back single-character domain names. This strategy differs from the registry's previous launches in which Schilling's company registered thousands of domains.

On April 15, 2014, the number of domains under Uniregistry's management increased by 50,735 after NSN registered large numbers of .gift, .link (19,945), .photo, .pics, .sexy and .tattoo domains. This increase caused the total number of generic top-level domains registered to pass the 500,000 threshold. More than 8,000 .photo and 4,000 .pics domains were registered by July 2014. As of April 2014, the extensions .link, .sexy, and .tattoo have been registered more than 20,000, 12,318, and 5,932 times, respectively, though these figures include Uniregistry's activated reserved domains. As of February 2015, .diet, .help, .hosting, and .property have been registered 14,596, 21,630, 11,609, and 38,464 times, respectively. The extensions were registered 787, 1,908, 1,197, and 1,490 times, respectively, on the first day of general availability; NSN later registered 13,268, 17,988, 9,329, and 35,991 domains, respectively. FTD purchased the domain Pro.flowers for $50,000 in 2015.

== Registrar services and tools ==
In 2015, the registrar surpassed 1.3 million domains under management. Bulk tools offered by the company include: "Domain Tracker" for monitoring domain expiration dates; two-step account verification for enhanced security; cloud storage for organizing domain attachments; and optional integration with DomainNameSales, which allows users to link their DNS and Uniregistry accounts. The company began offering an affiliate program called "Uniregistry Affiliate Plus" in 2014.

The registrar along with Domain Name Sales (DNS) was acquired by GoDaddy in April 2020.

== See also ==
- List of Internet top-level domains
