= .sucks =

Generic top-level Internet domain

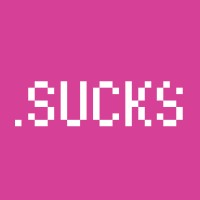
- Founded: 2015
- Industry: Domain Registrar
- Website: get.sucks

.sucks is an internet domain registrar company that controls the rights to sell .sucks domains.

== .sucks domain names ==
.sucks domains are owned and controlled by the Vox Populi Registry. Vox Populi won the rights for .sucks gTLD in November 2014. Domains with .sucks names became available after the Internet Corporation for Assigned Names and Numbers (ICANN) approved the generic top-level domain name (gTLD) in 2014 and assigned it to Vox Populi Registry Inc. in March 2015.

Its primary use is apparently for domain hacks.

The number of registrations and renewals of .sucks domains appears to be declining as of 2018.

== Controversy ==
.sucks domains have generated controversy regarding potential cybersquatting, as individuals can purchase a trademarked domain with bad faith intent to sell the domain at an inflated price.

Several celebrities and companies have purchased .sucks domains in order to protect their brands from potential exploitation, including Taylor Swift, Apple, Facebook, and Microsoft.

As a result of the company's pricing model, .sucks has been criticized for high costs associated with trademarked .sucks domains.

In 2015, ICANN sent a letter to the U.S. Federal Trade Commission to investigate Vox Populi Registry for potentially illegal and predatory actions. The FTC concluded that Vox Populi did not break any rules, but pointed out that ICANN has previously ignored several concerns from the FTC on the topic of new domain names.
