= .one (domain) =

Internet top-level domain

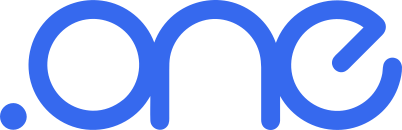
- Introduced: February 22, 2015 (root server); May 20, 2015 (general public)
- Status: Active
- Registry: One Registry & ARI Registry Services (a Neustar company)
- Actual use: one.one.one.one used by Cloudflare
- Registered domains: 187,874 (September 2022)
- Registration restrictions: None
- Documents: ICANN Registry Agreement
- DNSSEC: Yes
- Registry website: get.one

.one is a top-level domain. It was proposed in ICANN's New generic top-level domain (gTLD) Program, and became available to the general public on May 20, 2015. One Registry (a subsidiary of One.com A/S) and ARI Registry Services (a Neustar company) are the registries for the domain.

With the ICANN's New gTLD Program, One.com applied for management of the .one TLD. One.com won at private auction with Radix Registry the rights to the ".one" string. The auction was the "single sealed bid second price" model, in which the winner offers the highest bid and pays the second highest bid.

As of September 2022, .one was the 27th-most registered top-level-domain on the Internet, with 187,874 registrations. One.com was the second highest registrar for .one, out of its 107 accredited registrars.
