= OK Kosher Certification =

Food-products certification agency

Hechsher of Organized Kashrut Laboratories
- Certifying agency: Organized Kashrut Laboratories
- Founded: 1935
- Headquarters: 391 Troy Ave, Brooklyn, NY 11213 U.S.
- Key People: Rabbi Shlomo Weinfeld (Chairman, Executive Rabbinical Council); Rabbi Levi Marmulszteyn (Rabbinic Manager)
- Website: ok.org

OK Kosher Certification is a major kosher certification agency based out of Brooklyn, New York. It is one of the "Big Five," the five largest kosher certifying agencies in the United States. OK also has a large kosher presence in Asia.

== Early history ==
In 1935, Abraham Goldstein founded Organized Kashrut Laboratories (OK Labs) to meet the American Jewish community's need for kosher food products.

In 1968, Rabbi Bernard Levy purchased OK Labs. He was already involved in kosher certification several years prior to the purchase. At the time, it was certifying a relatively small number of companies, but under his leadership, the organization began to grow, certifying companies internationally. Rabbi Levy instituted several improvements in the methods employed by kosher certifying agencies to verify the nature of products. Until then, many ingredients of products were assumed to be kosher, without visiting the company of each one. His policy was to travel to each company to see how the production was done first-hand. This led him to further investigate other companies, as many ingredients were composed of other sub-ingredients. As the organization grew, and the workload increased, Rabbi Levy's son, Rabbi Don Yoel Levy, joined the OK to help expand the organization.

== Today ==
After the death of Rabbi Bernard Levy in 1987, his son Rabbi Don Yoel Levy assumed leadership of the organization. Upon Rabbi Don Yoel Levy’s death in 2020, the Executive Rabbinical Council took responsibility of the OK.

With more than 10 million consumers seeking kosher products in the United States alone, the kosher food industry has seen rapid growth in the past two decades, with sales reaching $165 billion in 2002. Today the OK Certifies over 700,000 products, produced by over 1500 companies worldwide, including food giants such as Kraft, Snapple, and ConAgra. It employs over 350 rabbis worldwide.

Besides giving Kosher Certification, the OK actively promotes education and observance of kosher laws and attitudes. There are many books written on the subject, while most popular are the kosher-approved recipes.

Its headquarters are in Brooklyn, New York, with offices in Europe and Israel. The OK holds an annual Mashgichim conference at the Jewish Children's Museum. In 2014, OK Kosher won the rights to the .kosher domain name. In 2015, Kehilla Kosher from Los Angeles merged with OK Kosher. The agency often expands its supervision of restaurants, mainly located in New York.

== See also ==
- Kosher foods
- Kashrut
- Mashgiach
- Hechsher
- Orthodox Judaism
