= .guru =

Internet top-level domain

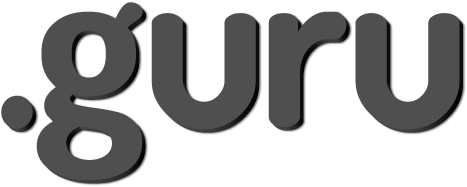
- Introduced: 2013
- TLD type: Generic top-level domain
- Status: Active
- Registry: Identity Digital
- Intended use: General expertise
- Registered domains: 60,360 (February 2022)
- DNSSEC: Yes
- IDN: Yes

.guru is a generic top-level domain (gTLD) owned by Identity Digital. It was delegated on 6 November 2013.

== History ==
.guru was one of the first seven gTLDs launched simultaneously by Donuts in late 2013. (Note: The other six were .bike, .clothing, .holdings, .plumbing, .singles, and .ventures.) The sunrise period, during which pre-existing trademark holders may register URLs prior to general availability to prevent domain squatting, lasted from 26 November 2013 through to 24 January 2014. .guru did not undergo a landrush period in which a closed group of non-trademark holders are able to purchase domains for a premium price, and instead went straight to general availability release.

The launch of .guru was part of a significant movement in the creation of top-level domains; prior to 2014, only 22 gTLDs were available for registration, while over a thousand were launched in February 2014 alone. .guru quickly became the pre-eminent new gTLD in signups, having 55,000 registrations by May of that year with 35,000 in the first three weeks of its opening alone. Until the release of .app, .guru had the most pre-orders of any new gTLD at GoDaddy.

However, the market for new gTLDs performed below expectations, with fewer registrations and a smaller market share than originally predicted. While .guru's first-mover advantage gave it a respectable market share amongst other minor gTLDs, the overall picture was of a more niche product than anticipated. In 2015, a year after its launch, .guru was found to have the second highest number of its registrations lapsed or deleted after .tips.

Despite the failure to meet original expectations, .guru nonetheless remains a popular niche for many individuals and small businesses, particularly in India.

== Usage ==
As of 2022, there are 60,360 registered .guru domains, making up 0.21% of all domains. GoDaddy has the majority of the .guru market share with 47.4%, while NameCheap runs a distant second at 11.3%. Approximately 56,000 of the registrations are to active websites, and an estimated $1.5-2 million dollars are paid in .guru registration fees per year. According to The Spamhaus Project, as of September 2023 3.9% of .guru domains engage in spamming, compared to 1.5% of .com, 2.1% of .net, 6.6% of .info, 2.7% of .biz, and 0.8% of .org domains. .guru's primary competitors are .expert, which is similarly focused on expertise, and .ninja, another "edgy" expert-focused gTLD.
