= Radix (company) =

Domain registry operator

- Company type: Private
- Industry: Internet, Domain name registry
- Founded: 2012
- Founder: Bhavin Turakhia, Divyank Turakhia
- Headquarters: Mumbai, India
- Area served: Worldwide
- Key people: Bhavin Turakhia (Founder & CEO)
- Products: gTLDs (.fun, .host, .online, .uno, .press, .pw, .site, .space, .store, .tech, .website)
- Parent: Directi Group
- Website: radix.website

Radix Registry, also known as Radix, is a domain registry operator known for managing and marketing new generic top-level domains (gTLDs). It was founded in 2012 by Indian entrepreneurs Bhavin and Divyank Turakhia.

== History ==
Brothers Bhavin and Divyank Turakhia founded Radix in 2012. The company was founded with the objective of applying for and operating new gTLDs through ICANN’s expansion program. Prior to Radix, the two had founded the tech venture Directi in 1998, when they were in their teens. Radix was initially a subsidiary of Directi.

Around 2014, Radix also launched the new top-level domains “.host,” “.press,” “.space,” and “.website.” The company has since launched more domain extensions including “.fun,” “.online,” “.store,” “.tech,” “.site,” and “.uno.”

Radix formed an anti-piracy partnership with the MPAA in 2016, which was the MPAA’s first anti-piracy partnership with a domain name registry outside the United States. As part of the agreement, Radix would prevent pirate sites from using domain names and report copyright-infringing sites.

In 2018, Sandeep Ramchandani was appointed as Radix’s global CEO, succeeding Bhavin Turakhia.

In 2019, two of its TLDs, “.online” and “.site” domain names surpassed 1 million domains under management.

Radix launched the business name generator Namify in September 2020. The app uses artificial intelligence to generate legally available business names and business logos based on the prompt given by the user.

Radix secured its largest non-.com gTLD sale to date after selling the domain “Betting.online” directly to a buyer for $400,000 in 2023.
