= At-Large Advisory Committee =

Advisory committee for Internet maintenance

The At-Large Advisory Committee (ALAC) is an advisory committee to ICANN, the organization that administers the Internet's Domain Name System and addressing system. According to ICANN Bylaw XI.4.a, "ALAC is the primary organizational home within ICANN for individual Internet users", with a mandate to "consider and provide advice on the activities of ICANN, insofar as they relate to the interests of individual Internet users".

== Structure and mission ==
The ALAC is composed by fifteen members, three from each of the five geographic regions used by ICANN for geographical diversity requirements.

As a part of its mission, the ALAC reaches out for groups of individual Internet users all around the world - identified as At-Large Structures (ALSes) - and encourages them to apply for accreditation by ICANN. Once accredited, these groups can participate in the five Regional At-Large Organizations (RALOs), regional groupings that host discussions at a regional level. In turn, each RALO appoints two members of the ALAC (for a total of ten members out of fifteen). This builds an open, bottom-up mechanism to select the ALAC members. The remaining five members of the ALAC are appointed by ICANN's Nominating Committee.

The ALAC appoints one non-voting representative to the councils of the Generic Names Supporting Organization and to the Country Code Names Supporting Organization, and liaisons to ICANN working groups and task forces. It also appoints five members (one per geographic region) of ICANN's Nominating Committee. It has some statutory authority, though limited, to influence ICANN's policy making activities. However, it usually shares its opinions through non-binding advisory statements sent to the ICANN Board.

Originally the ALAC appointed a liaison to the ICANN Board; however, that position was abolished in 2010 when an additional, fully voting position on the ICANN Board was designated to be selected by the At-Large community. The first person selected by this process, joining the ICANN Board in October 2012, was former ALAC member Sébastien Bachollet.

== History ==
The ALAC was created in 2002, as one of the changes introduced in the so-called "ICANN 2.0" reform, with the purpose of providing a viable mechanism for participation by a significant number of active individual users of the Internet from around the world. Its structure was studied through the At-Large Advisory Committee Assistance Group, which made a proposal that was then approved by the ICANN Board.

The first ALAC was appointed in January 2003. Since the Regional At-Large Organizations did not exist yet, the committee was marked as "interim" and the ten regional members were appointed by the ICANN Board instead. The initial membership included the former ICANN Chairman Esther Dyson. The initial Chairman was Vittorio Bertola, and the first appointed liaison to the ICANN Board was Roberto Gaetano, and Thomas Roessler to the GNSO, who in December 2004 left his position to Bret Fausett. In March 2006, Bertola left the Chairmanship to Annette Muehlberg; in December 2006, Bertola was appointed as the new Board liaison, Alan Greenberg as GNSO liaison, and Siavash Shahshahani as CCNSO liaison.

Initially, there was widespread concern that the ALAC would fail as a result of a perception of disenfranchisement common to many Internet rights groups - especially the North American ones - that followed the demise by ICANN of the original At-Large election plan. However, the number of accredited At-Large Structures grew slowly but steadily, reaching 100 in the first months of 2007. In December 2006, the first Regional At-Large Organization, the Latin American RALO, was formally accredited by ICANN. Further RALOs for Europe, Africa and Asia-Pacific were expected to be accredited in the first half of 2007.

== Membership ==
=== 2021 membership ===
- Maureen Hilyard (Asia Pacific)
- Jonathan Zuck (North America)
- Joanna Kulesza (Europe)
- Humberto Carrasco (Latin America)
- Tijani Ben Jemaa (Africa)
- Dave Kissoondoyal (Africa)
- Abdulkarim Oloyede (Africa)
- Holly Raiche (Asia Pacific)
- Justine Chew (Asia Pacific)
- Bastiaan Gosling (Europe)
- Matthias Hudobnik (Europe)
- Pari Esfandiari (Europe)
- Carlos Raul Gutierrez (Latin America)
- Sylvia Herlein Leite (Latin America)
- Marita Moll (North America)
- Javier Rua-Jovet (North America)

=== EURALO Individual Members ===
- Alastair Strachan (Netherlands)
- Amali De Silva-Mitchell (United Kingdom)
- Ana Kakalashvili (Germany)
- Andrei Kolesnikov (Russian Federation)
- Anna Romandash (Ukraine)
- Auke Pals (Netherlands)
- Carole Sunderland (Switzerland)
- Christel Dahlskjaer (United Kingdom)
- Cisse Kane (Switzerland)
- Clement Genty (France)
- Daniel Leuenberger (Switzerland)
- Danko Jevtovic (Serbia)
- Desara Dushi (Albania)
- Desiree Miloshevic (United Kingdom)
- Desislava Atanasova (Bulgaria)
- Dina Solveig Jalkanen (Finland)
- Dušan Popovic (Serbia)
- Eric Tomson (Belgium)
- Fotjon Kosta (Albania)
- Gerhard Landauf (Austria)
- Helén Palm (Sweden)
- Ioana Stupariu (Hungary)
- Jacqueline Eggenschwiler (Switzerland)
- James Gannon (Ireland)
- Jean-Jacques Subrenat (France)
- Joanna Kulesza (Poland)
- John McCormac (Ireland)
- José Alberto Barrueto Rodríguez (Spain)
- Julian Ludlow (United Kingdom)
- Laurin Weissinger (United Kingdom)
- Leena Romppainen (Switzerland)
- Lousewies van der Laan (Netherlands)
- Maria Kolesnikova (Russian Federation)
- Maria Korniiets (Ukraine)
- Máté Mester (Hungary)
- Mathias Challend de Cevins (France)
- Matthias Hudobnik (Austria)
- Michael Oghia (Serbia)
- Michele Neylon (Ireland)
- Muhammad Farhan (Ireland)
- Narine Khachatryan (Armenia), observer
- Natalia Filina (Russian Federation)
- Nertil Berdufi (Albania)
- Nicolas Koray Namer (France)
- Pablo Mazurier (Spain)
- Pantelis Kassotis (Greece)
- Pari Esfandiari (United Kingdom)
- Raza Qureshi (Denmark)
- Remo Hardeman (Netherlands)
- Ricardo Holmquist (Spain)
- Rim Hayat Chaif (Denmark)
- Robert Baskerville (United Kingdom)
- Roberto Gaetano (Austria)
- Shwetal Shah (United Kingdom)
- Stuart Clark (United Kingdom)
- Sylwia Marcinkowska (Poland)
- Tapani Tarvainen (Finland)
- Tatiana Tropina (Germany)
- Thierry Piette-Coudol (France)
- Veronica Cretu (Moldova)
- Wale Shakiru Bakare (United Kingdom)
- Zaneta Vinopalova (Czech Republic)

=== ALAC Executive Committee (ExCom) 2020 ===
- Chair - Maureen Hilyard (Asia Pacific)
- Vice-Chairs - Jonathan Zuck (North America) and Joanna Kulesza (Europe)
- Executive Members - Tijani Ben Jemaa (Africa) and Humberto Carrasco (Latin America)

=== ALAC Liaisons ===
- ccNSO - Barrack Otieno (Africa)
- GNSO - Cheryl Langdon-Orr (Asia Pacific)
- SSAC - Andrei Kolesnikov (Europe)
- GAC - Yrjo Lansipuro (Europe)

=== Former ALAC Liaisons ===
- Board - Vanda Scartezini (Latin America) and Wendy Seltzer (North America)
- ccNSO - Maureen Hilyard (Asia Pacific), Cheryl Langdon-Orr (Asia Pacific), Rudi Vansnick (Europe)
- IDN Policy - Edmon Chung (Asia Pacific), James Seng (Asia/Pacific) and Sivasubramanian Muthusamy (Asia/Pacific)

=== Past membership ===
- Hadia Elminiawi (Africa)
- Titi Akinsanmi (Africa)
- Yaovi Atohoun (Africa)
- Edmon Chung (Asia/Pacific)
- Salanieta Tamanikaiwaimaro (Asia/Pacific)
- Rinalia Abdul Rahim (Asia/Pacific)
- Olivier Crépin-Leblond (Europe)
- Jean-Jacques Subrenat (Europe)
- Sandra Hoferichter (Europe)
- Natalia Enciso (Latin America)
- Carlton Samuels (Latin America)
- Sergio Salinas Porto (Latin America)
- Eduardo Diaz (North America)
- Evan Leibovitch (North America)
- Ganesh Kumar (North America)
- Gareth Shearman (North America)
- Chery Langdon-Orr (Asia/Pacific)
- James Seng (Asia/Pacific)
- Mohammed El Bashir (Africa)
- Adam Peake (Europe)
- Dr. V. C.Vivekanandan (Asia/Pacific)
- Patrick Vande Walle (Europe)
- Alan Greenberg (North America)
- Carlos Aquirre ( (Latin America)
- Sébastien Bachollet (Europe)
- Beau Brendler (United States)
- Hawa Diakite (Africa)
- Erick Iriarte Ahon (Latin America) (January 2003 – December 2006)
- Izumi Aizu (Asia/Pacific)
- Vittorio Bertola (Europe) (January 2003 – May 2007)
- Veronica Cretu (Europe)
- Pierre Dandjinou (Africa)
- Esther Dyson (North America) (January 2003 – December 2004)
- Clement Dzidonu (Africa)
- Bret Fausett (North America)
- Sunday Folayan (Africa) (June 2003 – December 2005)
- Roberto Gaetano (Europe) (June 2003 – December 2006)
- Robert Guerra (North America)
- Kenneth Hamma (North America) (June 2003 – December 2004)
- Xue Hong (Asia/Pacific)
- Nguyen Thu Hue (Asia/Pacific)
- John Levine (North America) (February 2005 – March 2007)
- Toshifumi Matsumoto (Asia/Pacific) (June 2003 – December 2005)
- Jacqueline Morris (Latin America)
- Annette Muehlberg (Europe)
- Jean Armour Polly (North America) (December 2004 – December 2006)
- José Ovidio Salgueiro(Latin America)
- Sebastian Ricciardi (Latin America) (January 2003 – December 2006)
- Thomas Roessler (Europe) (January 2003 – December 2004)
- Josè-Ovidio Salgueiro (Latin America)
- Vanda Scartezini (Latin America)
- Sylvia Herlein-Leite (Latin America)
- Wendy Seltzer (North America)
- Siavash Shahshahani(Asia/Pacific)
- Fatimata Seye Sylla (Africa)
- Tadao Takahashi (Latin America) (June 2003 – December 2005)
- Alice Wanjira-Munyua (Africa)
