= Fatimata =

Fatimata is a given name. Notable people with the name include:

- Fatimata Diasso (born 1990), Ivorian athlete
- Fatimata M'baye (born 1957), Mauritanian lawyer
- Fatimata Seye Sylla, Senegalese politician
- Fatimata Touré, Malian activist
- Salifou Fatimata Bazeye, Nigerien jurist
- Hadja Fatimata Ouattara, Burkina Faso politician
