= Pari Esfandiari =

British businesswoman

Pari Esfandiari is a British businesswoman. She is the co-founder and president of the Global TechnoPolitics Forum and CEO of Pario. She is a member of the At Large Advisory Committee (ALAC) at the ICANN, representing European region (Euralo), as well as a member of the GeoTech Action Council at the Atlantic Council. In addition, she serves at the APCO Worldwide’s International Advisory Council. She was a non-resident senior fellow at the Atlantic Council.

Esfandiari is an entrepreneur, internet pioneer and sustainable development executive. She has worked across diverse industries ranging from FinTech, e-commerce and smart cities. Her social enterprise was showcased by UNESCO and supported by Google Foundation for supporting women’s role in sustainable development. Esfandiari holds a doctorate in sustainability business from Oxford Brookes University in Oxford, England.

Her latest co-authored publication is a study on "Data: Governance and Geopolitics".

== Publications ==
- Data: Governance and Geopolitics (with Gregory F. Treverton) (CSIS, 2021).
- Fighting Covid and an attempted coup: the shining moments of 2020 (with Gregory F. Treverton) (the Article, 2021).
- Mark Zuckerberg, meet Jean-Jacques Rousseau? (with Gregory F. Treverton and John Walcott) (the Hill, 2021).
- American Democracy Held (with Gregory F. Treverton) (Global TechnoPolitics Forum).
- Foreign Policy on the Home Front (with Gregory F. Treverton and John Walcott).
- Why data governance matters: Use, trade, intellectual property, and diplomacy (with Gregory F. Treverton) (Atlantic Council, 2020).
- Remembering history so not to repeat it (with Gregory F. Treverton) (the Article, 2020).
- The Iran crisis- the US has no strategy (with Gregory F. Treverton) (the Article, 2020).
- The intelligence did not justify Soleimani’s assassination (with Gregory F. Treverton) (the Article, 2020).
- Viewing tech giants as a geopolitical force (with Gregory F. Treverton) (the Hill, 2020).
- Data has paralleled oil in becoming an intensely political national security issue (with Gregory F. Treverton) (the Hill, 2019).
