= Seye =

Seye or Sèye may refer to:

== People ==
=== Given name ===
- Seye Abimbola (born 1982), Nigerian public health doctor, academic, writer, and BMJ Global Health journal editor-in-chief 2015-2024
- Seye Adelekan (born 1988), Nigerian-British bassist, musician and singer-songwriter
- Seye Kehinde (born 1965), Nigerian journalist
- Seye Ogunlewe (born 1991), Nigerian track and field sprinter

=== Surname ===
- Abdoulaye Seye (1934–2011), Senegalese sprinter
- Bouna Medoune Seye (Bouna Médoune Sèye, 1956–2017), Senegalese painter and film maker
- Chérif Elvalide Seye (died 2012), Senegalese journalist with Les Afriques newspaper
- Fatimata Seye Sylla, Senegalese ICT promoter
- Matthieu Seye, Senegalese swimmer
- Mouhamadou Seye (born 1988), Slovak footballer
- Nils Seye Larsen (born 1980), Swedish politician
- Younousse Sèye (born 1940), Senegalese artist and actress

== Location ==
- Seyé Municipality, municipality in the Mexican state of Yucatán
