= 9/11 Public Discourse Project =

American non-profit organization

The 9/11 Public Discourse Project was a non-governmental organization with 501(c)(3) nonprofit status, started by the ten members of the 9/11 Commission after the commission disbanded on August 21, 2004. Intended as a public education campaign which focused on making America safer and more aware of existing and potential dangers, the project ceased operations on December 31, 2005.

The project received a $25,000 grant from the Smith Richardson Foundation on December 31, 2004, to allow Commissioner Christopher A. Kojm to "lead an effort to educate the American public on the findings of the 9/11 Commission. He will organize a series of nationwide briefings by the members of the commission at which they will discuss the implications of their findings for U.S. national security." Media Transparency reported, without further elaboration, that the Project was connected with the Foundation for Rational Economics and Education.

Philip Shenon reported in the New York Times on June 6, 2005 that the Commission "repeatedly clashed with the Bush administration, which had originally opposed its creation, especially over the panel's access to important White House documents and to witnesses." Shenon pointed out that the Commission had concluded that the Bush administration had made " 'minimal' or 'unsatisfactory' progress" on eight of the fourteen recommendations the Commission had made "for overhauling the government to deal with terrorist threats." Thomas Kean, who chaired the official 9/11 Commission, found particularly worrisome the failure to make any serious effort to secure nuclear material to address the potential for nuclear terror that intelligence analysts feared as inevitable, otherwise. According to Noam Chomsky, the purpose of the 9/11 Discourse Project was to "pressure the government to implement its recommendations to prevent terrorist attacks."
