= Sitefinder =

Sitefinder may refer to:

- Site Finder, a wildcard DNS record for all .com and .net unregistered domain names, run by .com and .net top-level domain operator VeriSign during 15 September – 4 October 2003
- Sitefinder database, an incomplete list of mobile phone base stations in the UK
