= Waiting list =

Waiting list, Waiting List or similar terms may refer to:

- Waiting List Service, for Internet domain name registrations
- Wait list, in United States university and college admissions
- Waiting list ticket, a Reservation against Cancellation ticket for travel on Indian Railways
- Waiting List, alternate name of the 2000 Cuban film Lista de Espera

== See also ==
- Waiting period
