= Comes (disambiguation) =

A comes was an ancient Roman title.

Comes or COMES may also refer to:

== Religion ==
- An acolyth
- The Comes or Liber Comicus, one of the liturgical books of the Roman Rite

== Music ==
- An appearance of a fugue subject, the first appearance being dux, the second comes
- Comes, the following melody in a canon.
- The Comes, a Japanese hardcore punk band

== Other uses ==
- Marcellinus Comes (died c. 534), chronicler of the Roman Empire
- The fainter star in a binary (double) star system.
- COMES, a French organisation
