= List of ICANN meetings =

The Internet Corporation for Assigned Names and Numbers (ICANN) holds periodic public meetings rotated between continents for the purpose of encouraging global participation in its processes.

The following is a list of ICANN meetings:

Meeting	Date	City	Country	Region	Notes	Reference
84	2025, October 25–30	Dublin	Ireland	Europe/ Asia	ICANN84 | Dublin Annual General Meeting Relocated from Muscat, Oman due to uncertain situation in Middle East.|	
83	2025, June 9 - 12	Prague	Czech Republic	Europe	ICANN83 | Prague Policy Forum	https://meetings.icann.org/en/meetings/icann83/
82	2025, March 8 - 13	Seattle	United States	North America	ICANN82 Community Forum in Seattle	https://meetings.icann.org/en/meetings/icann82/
81	2024, November 9 - 14	Istanbul	Turkey	Europe/ Asia	ICANN81 | Annual General Meeting	https://meetings.icann.org/en/meetings/icann81
80	2024, June 10 - 13	Kigali	Rwanda	Africa	ICANN80 | Kigali Policy Forum	https://meetings.icann.org/en/meetings/icann80/
79	2024, February 20-22	Puerto Rico	Puerto Rico	North America	ICANN79 | San Juan Community Forum	
78	2023, October 21–26	Hamburg	Germany	TBD	(25th AGM)	
77	2023, June 12–15	Washington, D.C.	USA	TBD		
76	2023, March 11–16	Cancún	Mexico	Latin America and the Caribbean		
75	2022, September 17–22	Kuala Lumpur	Malaysia	Asia/Pacific	(24th AGM)	
74	2022, June 13–16	The Hague	Netherlands	Europe		
73	2022, March 5–10	San Juan	Puerto Rico	North America		Online instead due to Coronavirus
72	2021, October 23–28	Seattle	USA	North America	(23rd AGM)	Online instead due to Coronavirus
71	2021, June 14–17	The Hague	Netherlands	Europe		Online instead due to Coronavirus
70	2021, March 20–25	Cancún	Mexico	Latin America and the Caribbean		Online instead due to Coronavirus
69	2020, October 17–23	Hamburg	Germany	Europe (Tentative)	(22nd AGM)	Online instead due to Coronavirus
68	2020, June 22–25	Kuala Lumpur	Malaysia	Asia/Pacific		Online instead due to Coronavirus
67	2020, March 7–12	Cancún	Mexico	Latin America and the Caribbean		Online instead due to Coronavirus
66	2019, November 2–8	Montreal	Canada	North America	(21st AGM)	
65	2019, June 24–27	Marrakesh	Morocco	Africa		https://meetings.icann.org/en/marrakech65
64	2019, March 9–14	Kobe	Japan	Asia/Pacific		https://meetings.icann.org/en/kobe64
63	2018, October 20–26	Barcelona	Spain	Europe	(20th AGM)	https://meetings.icann.org/en/barcelona63
62	2018, June 25–28	Panama City	Panama	Latin America and the Caribbean		https://meetings.icann.org/en/panamacity62
61	2018, March 10–15	San Juan	Puerto Rico	North America		https://meetings.icann.org/en/sanjuan61
60	2017, October 28 - November 3	Abu Dhabi	UAE	Asia/Pacific	(19th AGM)	https://meetings.icann.org/en/abudhabi60
59	2017, June 26–29	Johannesburg	South Africa	Africa	ICANN59 Johannesburg hosted by ZADNA	ICANN59 Johannesburg Map and Meeting Schedule
58	2017, March 11–16	Copenhagen	Denmark	Europe		https://meetings.icann.org/en/copenhagen58
57	2016, November 3–9	Hyderabad	India	Asia/Pacific	(18th AGM) Originally scheduled for San Juan, but moved due to Zika virus concerns	https://www.icann.org/news/blog/relocating-icann57
56	2016, June 27–30	Helsinki	Finland	Europe	Originally scheduled for Panama City, but moved due to Zika virus concerns	https://meetings.icann.org/en/helsinki56
55	2016, March 5–10	Marrakesh	Morocco	Africa		https://meetings.icann.org/en/marrakech55
54	2015, October 18–22	Dublin	Ireland	Europe	(17th AGM)	https://meetings.icann.org/en/dublin54
53	2015, June 21–25	Buenos Aires	Argentina	Latin America and the Caribbean		https://buenosaires53.icann.org/en/
52	2015, February 8–12	Singapore	Singapore	Asia		Singapore 52 official site
51	2014, October 12–16	Los Angeles	USA	North America	(16th AGM)	http://la51.icann.org/
50	2014, June 22–26	London	United Kingdom	Europe		http://london50.icann.org/
49	2014, March 23–27	Singapore	Singapore	Asia/Pacific		http://singapore49.icann.org/
48	2013, November 17–21	Buenos Aires	Argentina	Latin America and the Caribbean	(15th AGM)	http://buenosaires48.icann.org/
47	2013, July 14–18	Durban	South Africa	Africa		http://durban47.icann.org/
46	2013, April 7–11	Beijing	China	Asia/Pacific		http://beijing46.icann.org/
45	2012, October 14–18	Toronto	Canada	North America	(14th AGM)	http://toronto45.icann.org/
44	2012, June 24–29	Prague	Czech Republic	Europe		http://prague44.icann.org/
43	2012, March 11–16	San José	Costa Rica	Latin America and the Caribbean		http://costarica43.icann.org/
42	2011, October 23–28	Dakar	Senegal	Africa	(13th AGM)	http://dakar42.icann.org/
41	2011, June 19–24	Singapore	Singapore	Asia/Pacific		http://singapore41.icann.org/
40	2011, March 13–18	San Francisco	USA	North America		http://svsf40.icann.org/
39	2010, December 5–10	Cartagena de Indias	Colombia	Latin America and the Caribbean	(12th AGM)	http://cartagena39.icann.org/
38	2010, June 20–25	Brussels	Belgium	Europe		http://brussels38.icann.org/
37	2010, March 7–12	Nairobi	Kenya	Africa		http://nbo.icann.org/
36	2009, October 25–30	Seoul	Korea	Asia/Pacific	(11th AGM)	http://sel.icann.org/
35	2009, June 21–26	Sydney	Australia	Asia/Pacific		http://syd.icann.org/
34	2009, March 1–6	Mexico City	Mexico	Latin America and the Caribbean		http://mex.icann.org/
33	2008, November 2–7	Cairo	Egypt	Africa	(10th AGM)	http://cai.icann.org/
32	2008, June 22–26	Paris	France	Europe		http://par.icann.org/
-	2008, April 1–3	Dubai	UAE	Asia/Pacific	Regional Meeting	https://web.archive.org/web/20130726182957/http://meetings.icann.org/dubai08/
31	2008, February 10–15	New Delhi	India	Asia/Pacific		http://delhi.icann.org/
30	2007, October 29 - November 2	Los Angeles	USA	North America	(9th AGM)	http://losangeles2007.icann.org/
-	2007, October 19–21	Taipei	Taiwan	Asia/Pacific	Regional Meeting	http://taipei2007.icann.org/
29	2007, June 25–29	San Juan	Puerto Rico	North America		http://sanjuan2007.icann.org/
28	2007, March 26–30	Lisbon	Portugal	Europe		http://www.icann.org/en/meetings/lisbon/archives.htm
27	2006, December 2–8	São Paulo	Brazil	Latin America and the Caribbean	(8th AGM)	http://www.icann.org/en/meetings/saopaulo/archives.html
26	2006, June 26–30	Marrakesh	Morocco	Africa		http://www.icann.org/en/meetings/marrakech
25	2006, March 25–31	Wellington	New Zealand	Asia/Pacific		http://www.icann.org/en/meetings/wellington
24	2005, Nov 30 - Dec 4	Vancouver	Canada	North America	(7th AGM)	http://www.icann.org/en/meetings/vancouver
23	2005, July 11–15	Luxembourg City	Luxembourg	Europe		http://www.icann.org/en/meetings/luxembourg
22	2005, April 4–8	Mar del Plata	Argentina	Latin America and the Caribbean		http://www.icann.org/en/meetings/mardelplata
21	2004, December 1–5	Cape Town	South Africa	Africa	(6th AGM)	http://www.icann.org/en/meetings/capetown
20	2004, July 19–23	Kuala Lumpur	Malaysia	Asia/Pacific		http://www.icann.org/en/meetings/kualalumpur
19	2004, March 2–6	Rome	Italy	Europe		http://www.icann.org/en/meetings/rome
18	2003, October 27–31	Carthage	Tunisia	Africa	(5th AGM)	http://www.icann.org/en/meetings/carthage
17	2003, June 22–26	Montreal	Canada	North America		http://www.icann.org/en/meetings/montreal
16	2003, March 23–27	Rio de Janeiro	Brazil	Latin America and the Caribbean		http://www.icann.org/en/meetings/riodejaneiro
15	2002, December 14–15	Amsterdam	Netherlands	Europe		http://www.icann.org/en/meetings/amsterdam/
14	2002, October 27–31	Shanghai	China	Asia/Pacific	(4th AGM)	http://www.icann.org/en/meetings/shanghai
13	2002, June 24–28	Bucharest	Romania	Europe		http://www.icann.org/en/meetings/bucharest/
12	2002, March 10–14	Accra	Ghana	Africa		http://www.icann.org/en/meetings/accra/
11	2001, November 12–15	Marina del Rey	USA	North America	(3rd AGM)	http://www.icann.org/en/meetings/mdr2001
10	2001, September 7–10	Montevideo	Uruguay	Latin America and the Caribbean		http://www.icann.org/en/meetings/montevideo
9	2001, June 1–4	Stockholm	Sweden	Europe		http://www.icann.org/en/meetings/stockholm
8	2001, March 9–13	Melbourne	Australia	Asia/Pacific		http://www.icann.org/en/meetings/melbourne
7	2000, November 13–16	Marina del Rey	USA	North America	(2nd AGM)	http://www.icann.org/en/meetings/mdr2000
6	2000, July 13–17	Yokohama	Japan	Asia/Pacific		http://www.icann.org/en/meetings/yokohama
5	2000, March 7–10	Cairo	Egypt	Africa		http://www.icann.org/en/meetings/cairo2000
4	1999, November 1–4	Los Angeles	USA	North America	(1st Annual General Meeting, AGM)	http://www.icann.org/en/meetings/losangeles99
3	1999, August 23–26	Santiago	Chile	Latin America and the Caribbean		http://www.icann.org/en/meetings/berlin
2	1999, May 25–27	Berlin	Germany	Europe		http://www.icann.org/en/meetings/berlin
1	1999, March 2–4	Singapore	Singapore	Asia-Pacific		http://archive.icann.org/en/meetings/singapore/
