= Janice Kephart =

American public policy expert

- Born: 12 May 1964 (age 62); Wilmington, Delaware, United States
- Education: Duke University (BA); Villanova University

Janice Kephart (born May 12, 1964) is an American public policy expert who received national attention for her input as a member of the 9/11 Commission in 2002. She was a key author of the 9/11 Commission Report and terrorist travel policies, as well as the immigration-related recommendations in the final 9/11 Report. She was the leading expert on implementation the 9/11 Commission border recommendations and border security measures for the United States following the 11 September attacks. Her work has impacted the national border debates since 2004, and have had influence on current immigration debates help in the United States. Her work got her invited to speak before the United Nations Security Council on terrorist travel in 2015 in Madrid.

== Early life ==
Kephart was born in Wilmington, Delaware, but grew up in Radnor, Pennsylvania. She attended Radnor High School before going on to graduate from Duke University in 1986 with a bachelor's degree in political science and history. She then attended Villanova Law School and graduated in 1992. Her mother, Lore Kephart, is the author of Paths to Prayer, Continuing Paths to Prayer, and was valedictorian of her graduating class at Villanova University. Villanova established The Lore Kephart '86 Distinguished Historians Lecture Series on May 22, 2009.

Kephart's great-grandfather is author, librarian and Smoky Mountain National Park advocate Horace Kephart, for whom Mount Kephart is named. He received a full scholarship to the University of Pennsylvania, where he graduated with a degree in chemical engineering. After running an oil refinery in Marcus Hook, Pennsylvania, he eventually attended the Massachusetts Institute of Technology as a Sloan Fellow and became a group vice president of Sun Oil Company (SUNOCO). Her sister is American award-winning author Beth Kephart and her brother, Jeff Kephart, is a member of the IBM Academy of Technology and a Fellow of the IEEE. Ken Burns' multi-part documentary, The National Parks: Americas Best Idea, features Kephart in the fourth episode (1920–1933), which was initially broadcast on September 30, 2009. Her great uncle is Lloyd Morgan, architect of the New York City landmarks Waldorf-Astoria Hotel and Metropolitan Life Insurance Building.

== Initial career ==
Kephart began her Capitol Hill career in 1996 as the counsel to Senate Judiciary Subcommittee on Technology and Terrorism for chairmen Jon Kyl and later Arlen Specter, serving until 1998. While there, Kephart was tasked with leading two legislative efforts, both of which resulted in bipartisan unanimous consent for the passage of legislation she helped craft and guided the passage of two bills later signed by President Bill Clinton: "The Year 2000 Information and Readiness Act" (signed Oct. 19, 1998) that provided liability immunity for millennium solutions information-sharing; and the "Identity Theft and Assumption Deterrence Act" (signed Oct. 30, 1998) that established digital identity theft as a federal crime as well as the Federal Trade Commission's clearinghouse for victims of identity theft. Kephart drafted the attending conference report.

On February 24, 1998, as a counsel to Chairman Jon Kyl of the Senate Judiciary Subcommittee on Technology, Terrorism and Government Information, Kephart produced the hearing "Foreign Terrorists in America: Five Years after the World Trade Center" that examined "the extent of and policies to prevent foreign terrorist operations in America" and its attending reports and addendums.

== Public service ==
Kephart has been called as a subject matter witness 19 times before the U.S. Congress from 2004 to 2015. Of these, she has been called 12 times as a witness in the House of Representatives, and five times as a witness before U.S. Senate committees, with three Statements for the Record. She was the director for international border organization BORDERPOL (2014–2015) and homeland security director at a former US subsidiary of OT Morpho, MorphoTrak (2015–2016) during which time she also testified before the House Committee on Oversight and Government Reform on terrorist travel vulnerabilities in the US Visa Waiver Program. In 2013, she briefly served Senator Jeff Sessions as a Special Counsel for the "Gang of Eight" immigration legislation.

== 9/11 Commission impact ==
Kephart was the border counsel to the National Commission on Terrorist Attacks Upon America (9/11 Commission) responsible for drafting many of the terrorist travel recommendations in the 9/11 Final Report and was a key author of the attending 9/11 and Terrorist Travel monograph. The 9/11 Commission investigation into facts and circumstances related how the 9/11 hijackers exploited vulnerabilities in the U.S. border system to get in and stay in the United States long enough to commit the terror attacks of that day.

Kephart advocated for Congressional passage of laws and subsequent oversight and executive branch implementation of key 9/11 Commission recommendations, including smarter border security policies and programs, biometric verification of border crossers, and minimum standards for breeder documents that resulted in the REAL ID law, and passport requirements for all persons entering the United States.

== Congressional Testimonies ==
- Senate Judiciary Committee: The REAL ID Act of 2005 (May 8, 2007)
- Senate Judiciary Committee: The Border Security, Economic Opportunity, and Immigration Modernization Act, S.744 (April 22, 2013)
- Senate Committee on Finance: Border Insecurity, Take Two: Fake IDs Foil the First Line of Defense (Aug. 2, 2006)
- House Committee on Oversight and Government Reform, Subcommittee on National Security and the Subcommittee on Health Care, Benefits and Administrative Rule: Terrorism and the Visa Waiver Program (Dec. 10, 2015)

== Cultural Impact ==
Kephart generated well-known buzz phrases such as "terrorist travel: and "assuring people are who they say they are." She has 19 testimonies before Congress as an independent thought leader and policy driver that include identity assurance, counterterrorism facts and circumstances, passport and driver license security, biometric border solutions, and visa requirements. In 2007, Duke Magazine listed her as one of the most influential graduates of Duke University from the 1980s.

"In the aftermath of September 11 and the knowledge at that time that our immigration system had failed us in not keeping the hijackers out of the country and off our domestic planes, the DHS was created to pull a number of agencies under a national security umbrella." - Janice Kephart, Director of National Security Policy
