= Jean-Jacques Subrenat =

French diplomat

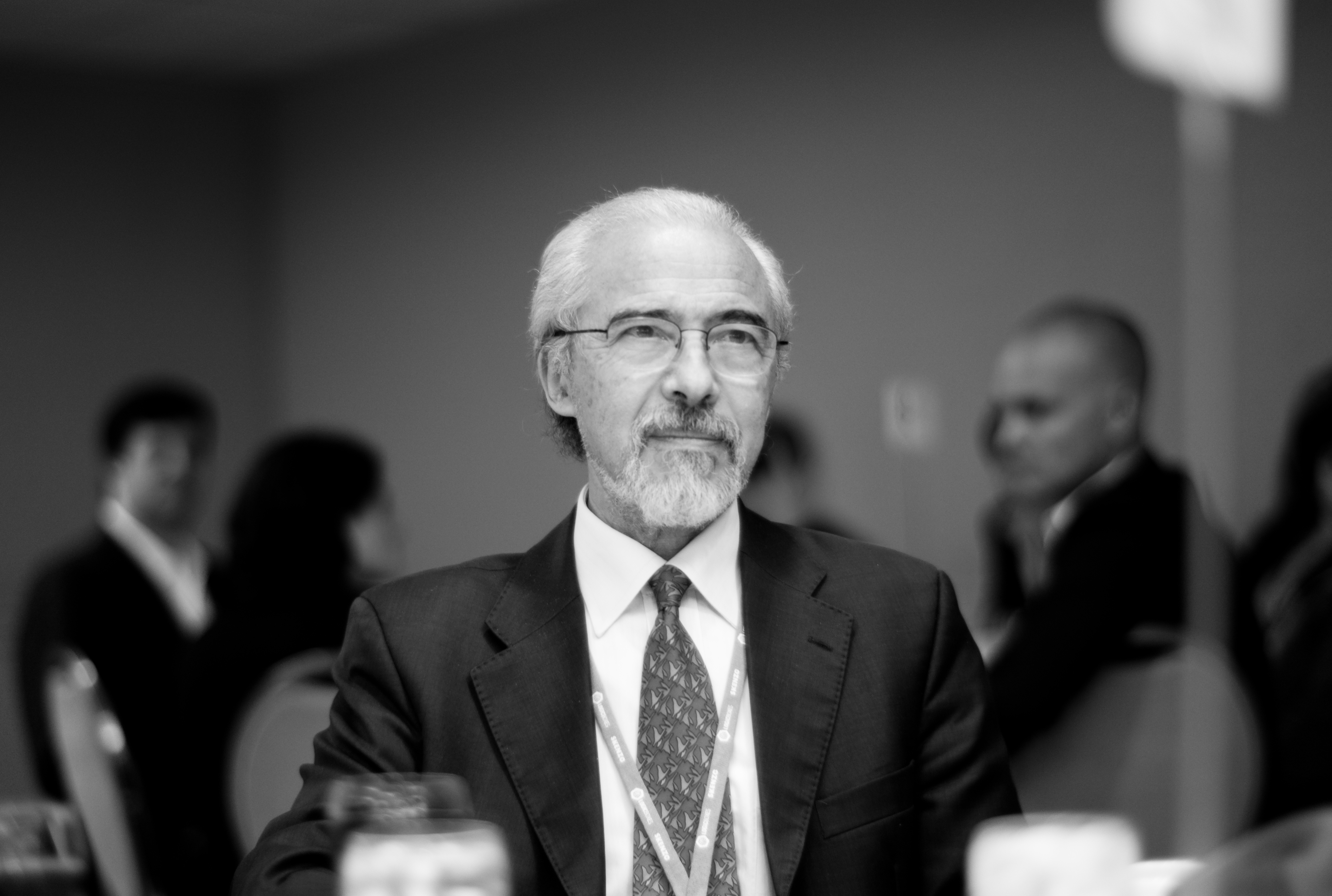
Jean-Jacques Subrenat

Jean-Jacques Subrenat (born 1940) is a French diplomat who served as ambassador, permanent representative to the Western European Union in Brussels (1995–1998), ambassador to Estonia (1998–2002) and to Finland (2002–2005). He represented France at the Board of Governors of the Asia-Europe Foundation (ASEF) in 2005. He retired from the diplomatic service in September 2005. Speaks, debates and writes on international relations, European Union affairs, Asia, defence and security, global trends and challenges, Internet governance. A member of the At-Large Advisory Committee (2010~12, again 2012–14) (ALAC) of the Internet Corporation for Assigned Names and Numbers (ICANN). Currently a member of the IANA Stewardship Transition Coordination Group (ICG). Member of the NetMundial Initiative Coordination Council (since December 2014).

Chairman of the Advisory Board (2007~09) of "Institut Pierre Werner" in Luxemburg. Tutor at ENA (Ecole nationale d'administration) in Strasbourg (2007~08). Member of the Board of Directors, [ICANN] (2007–2010). Special adviser to the Board of "Centre culturel et de rencontre Neumunster" (CCRN) in Luxembourg (2009–2010), which he represented on the Board of European Union National Institutes for Culture (EUNIC) (2008–2010). At EUNIC, he was a member of the organizing committee of the "Europe-China Cultural Dialogue 中欧文化对话 (Zhong-Ou wenhua duihua), also serving as keynote speaker and moderator in the first three sessions of this Dialogue (Beijing 2009, Copenhagen 2010, Shanghai 2011).

== Professional history ==
He served as a volunteer in the French Navy (1960–63), was a scholarship student in Bordeaux and Paris (1963–68) and worked as a research fellow at the Centre national de la recherche scientifique, CNRS from 1967 to 1971.

After entering the diplomatic service in 1972, he served at the French Ministry of foreign affairs in Paris (policy planning staff, administration and personnel, directorate for Asia and the Pacific, development cooperation, directorate for the Americas), and in several French embassies including as secretary in Singapore and counsellor and later minister-counsellor in Tokyo. He was seconded to the French Ministry of Industry (1978–80) to set up the International department at the French solar energy authority ComES, which subsequently became the Agency for the environment and energy management ADEME.

== Books published ==
- Initiator and Editor of "Estonia, identity and independence", published by Rodopi, Amsterdam and New York, 2004 ISBN 978-90-420-0890-8; also published, under his pen name A. Bertricau, in Estonian ISBN 978-9985-2-0613-3 and Russian ISBN 978-9985-2-0465-8 by Avita, Tallinn 2001; and in French, "Estonie, identité et indépendance" by L'Harmattan, Paris 2002 ISBN 978-2-7475-1036-3
- Listen, there's music from the forest: a short presentation of the Kuhmo Chamber Music Festival, in English and French, by Jean-Jacques Subrenat, ISBN 978-952-92-0564-6.
