= Christopher A. Kojm =

Chris Kojm

Chair of the National Intelligence Council
- In office July 6, 2009 – July 5, 2014
- President: Barack Obama
- Preceded by: Peter Lavoy
- Succeeded by: Gregory F. Treverton

Personal details
- Born: August 12, 1955 (age 70) Kenmore, New York, U.S.
- Party: Democratic
- Education: Harvard University (AB); Princeton University (MA)

Christopher A. "Chris" Kojm is a professor at George Washington University. From 2009 to 2014, he served as the chairman of the National Intelligence Council during the Obama administration.

== Early life and education ==
Kojm was valedictorian at Lancaster High School. Kojm went on to receive an AB from Harvard College in 1977 and an MA from the Woodrow Wilson School of Public and International Affairs at Princeton University in 1979.

== Career ==
From 1979 to 1984, he was a senior editor at the Foreign Policy Association in New York City.

From 1984 to 1998, he was a staff member of the House Foreign Affairs Committee under Lee H. Hamilton, the ranking member, then chairman of the committee.

From 1998 to 2003, Kojm was Deputy Assistant Secretary for Intelligence Policy and Coordination in the State Department's Bureau of Intelligence and Research. He then served as Deputy Director of the National Commission on Terrorist Attacks Upon the United States, later serving as president of the 9/11 Public Discourse Project.

Between 2004 and 2006, he was a visiting professor at his alma mater, the Woodrow Wilson School of Public and International Affairs. In 2006, he was a senior adviser to the Iraq Study Group. In 2007, he became a faculty member of the Elliott School of International Affairs at George Washington University, and returned to teach at the Elliott School in 2014. In 2009, Kojm was appointed Chairman of the National Intelligence Council by Director of National Intelligence Dennis C. Blair, where he oversaw intelligence analysis and National Intelligence Estimates, showcasing his expertise in national security and policy-making.

In November 2020, Kojm was named a volunteer member of the Joe Biden presidential transition Agency Review Team to support transition efforts related to the United States Intelligence Community.

Government offices
Preceded by Peter Lavoy	Chair of the National Intelligence Council; 2009–2014	Succeeded by Gregory F. Treverton
