= Trademark Clearinghouse =

Database of trademarks for gTLDs

- Focus: Centralized database of verified trademarks for use in Domain Name System
- Designated by: ICANN
- Website: www.trademark-clearinghouse.com

The Trademark Clearinghouse is a database of validated and registered trademarks established by ICANN to assist trademark holders prevent infringing behavior in the Domain Name System. In combination with the Uniform Rapid Suspension System (URS), it is the second significant attempt by ICANN to handle the "Trademark Dilemma". The first attempt was the Uniform Domain-Name Dispute-Resolution Policy.

The Trademark Clearinghouse is not a trademark office. Rights holders who register their marks with the Trademark Clearinghouse must still register with their country's trademark office. The primary purpose of the Trademark Clearinghouse is to maintain a global database of verified trademarks for the Domain Name System.

The Trademark Clearinghouse is strictly for second-level domain names. Other mechanisms exist to protect trademark in the new gTLDs themselves. All new gTLD registries are required to use the Trademark Clearinghouse and URS for protection of Second-level domains.

== History ==
One of the initial tasks of ICANN when it was formed was to deal with the so-called "Trademark Dilemma", which is determining the appropriate balance of rights between domain name holders and trademark owners. So in December 1999 ICANN launched the Uniform Domain-Name Dispute-Resolution Policy. Starting in 2008 ICANN began a new program to launch many more new Generic top-level domains. As part of this program ICANN envisioned a replacement program for the Uniform Domain-Name Dispute-Resolution Policy.

On March 6, 2009 ICANN commissioned 18 intellectual property experts from around the world entitled the Implementation Recommendation Team (IRT). They produced a report on May 29, 2009 with numerous recommendations to protect intellectual property rights holders. Most importantly, the report recommended an Intellectual Property Clearinghouse be created in concert with a Uniform Rapid Suspension System (URS).

The recommendation of the Intellectual Property Clearinghouse became the basis for the Trademark Clearinghouse and together with the URS eventually replaced the Uniform Domain-Name Dispute-Resolution Policy.

On May 28, 2010 ICANN published the Trademark Clearinghouse Proposal. The proposal emerged from an ICANN meeting held in Nairobi between the 7th and 12 March 2010. In the proposal both the Trademark Clearinghouse and the Universal Rapid Suspension program were proposed as possible replacements for the Uniform Domain-Name Dispute-Resolution Policy.

In November 2012 ICANN organized meetings in Los Angeles and Brussels to consider the implementation of the Trademark Clearinghouse for new top level domains. The outcome of these meetings was a straw man proposal for the Trademark Clearinghouse.

In March 2013 the Trademark Clearinghouse launched.

=== Controversy ===
The new gTLD program initially faced heavy criticism from many brand owners. Specifically, the Association of National Advertisers created an organization called Coalition for Responsible Internet Domain Oversight (CRIDO) and began lobbying ICANN to halt the new gTLD rollout. The brand owners saw the creation of more gTLDs as a further cost to protect their trademarks from cybersquatting. They wanted strong trademark protections built into the new gTLD program.

Milton Mueller, a professor at Syracuse University and frequent critic of ICANN, argues that the creation of the Trademark Clearinghouse was entirely hijacked by the advertising and intellectual property stakeholders, primarily by groups like the Association of National Advertisers (ANA). He argues that ICANN staff ignored its established bottom up processes when it did not suit them, and instead implemented the straw man proposal against the wishes of the Generic Names Supporting Organization (GNSO), Noncommercial Stakeholders Group (NCSG), and numerous other stakeholders.

DNS news site DomainIncite.com has also been critical of the Trademark Clearinghouse development process.

==== Brussels and Los Angeles meetings ====
Many non-commercial observers have criticised ICANN for the way in which the Trademark Clearinghouse was developed. Most of this criticism has stemmed from a lack of openness concerning the proceedings at the Los Angeles and Brussels meetings. In response to this criticism ICANN's Ombudsman opened a probe into the closed door nature of these meetings in December 2012.

Robin Gross, chair of ICANN's Noncommercial Stakeholders Group (NCSG) claimed that the NCSG was largely ignored during the proceedings, while the Business Constituency and Intellectual Property Constituency were overly represented. Using ICANN's Documentary Information Disclosure Program (DIDP) process, ICANN's version of a FOIA request, the NCSG requested all information concerning the Los Angeles and Brussels meetings. In response, the NCSG received no new information

The NCSG criticised the Brussels meeting immediately prior to it. In response, Fadi Chehade, CEO of ICANN, explained the purpose of the meeting in Brussels as simply an informal white board brainstorming session. After the meeting Chehade wrote a blog post detailing what happened at the Brussels meeting.

==== Red Cross / Red Crescent ====
On June 25, 2014, ICANN's Governmental Advisory Committee (GAC) issued a comminuque entitled, "Protection of Red Cross / Red Crescent Names". The communique exempted the 'terms and names associated with the Red Cross and Red Crescent' from trademark protection while still affording them protected status. The communique advised that the names not be subject to policy considerations relating to trademark, because they cannot receive adequate treatment under trademark law. Instead the permanent protection of these names should be confirmed.

In response, ICANN's Generic Names Supporting Organization (GNSO) suggested the names simply be added to the Trademark Clearinghouse. The matter is still being debated.

== Protection services ==
The Trademark Clearinghouse is not a rights protection mechanism itself. Instead, additional mechanisms coupled with the Trademark Clearinghouse help trademark owners protect their rights. There are two special time periods where trademark holders are given special treatment, ongoing notification services, and the URS. There are also differentiated services offered by specific registries. These build on the Trademark Clearinghouse to afford special treatment to trademark holders with verified trademarks in the Trademark Clearinghouse.

=== Sunrise period ===
The sunrise period is a time period immediately prior to the launching of a TLD. Trademark Clearinghouse registrants receive priority access to reserve domain names associated with their trademarks before general access. New gTLD registries are required to offer a sunrise period of at least 30 days.

=== Claims period ===
During the claims period registrants attempting to register a second-level domain name under a TLD which utilizes the Trademark Clearinghouse will receive a warning if the name matches an entry in the Trademark Clearinghouse. If the registrant registers the name anyway, the rights owner will receive a notification from the Trademark Claims system. The claims period is required to last at least 90 days after the initial launch of the new gTLD.

=== Ongoing notifications ===
Rights holders with trademarks registered in the Trademark Clearinghouse can opt in to receive additional notifications after the claims period expires. Holders will be notified of exact matches to names they have registered in the Trademark Clearinghouse. This service is optional and free.

=== Domain Protected Marks List ===
Domain Protected Marks List (DPML) is a service offered by specific new gTLD registry operators based on the Trademark Clearinghouse. It is not a standard service offered to rights holders registered in the Trademark Clearinghouse, nor is it standardized by ICANN. Different registries will implement DPML differently as a means of marketplace differentiation. Typically registries will offer to defensively block registrations that are more than just exact matches.

== Uniform Rapid Suspension ==
As part of the new gTLD program ICANN developed an accompanying rights protection mechanism for trademark holders called the Uniform Rapid Suspension (URS). Work on the URS started in September 2012 with an RFI issued by ICANN. It was finalized in January 2014.

The URS is not meant to replace the Uniform Domain-Name Dispute-Resolution Policy, but instead complement it. In contrast to the UDRP, the URS is meant as a lightweight, inexpensive, expedited arbitration process for resolving obvious trademark rights violations. Unlike the UDRP, successful URS claims only cause a domain name to be suspended and redirected, not seized. Also, the URS is not intended for use where facts are in question. URS decisions can take as little as one week to resolve.

Registries and registrars participating in the new gTLD program are required to implement the URS. In the context of the URS, they are called providers.

=== How it works ===
Every URS claim starts with a complaint filed by a trademark holder against a registrant of a domain name they believe to be infringing their trademark. The complainant must also pay a one time non-refundable fee of $375. Within two days of the complaint being filed an administrative review will be held by the URS provider.

If this review determines the complaint is in proper order the domain name will be locked, preventing changes to the DNS, and the allegedly offending registrant will be notified of the complaint. The registrant then has 14 calendar days to respond to the complaint before the complaint proceeds to default.

After the complaint has been filed and either a response has been received or the complaint has entered default, a single examiner selected by the provider determines the outcome. The examiner should then examine the evidence and issue a verdict using a standard of clear and convincing evidence.

The examiner should find in favor of the complainant if; the registered domain name is identical or confusingly similar to a word mark, the complainant holds a valid and current national or regional registration of the mark in question, this mark is registered and validated in the Trademark Clearinghouse, the registrant has no legitimate right or interest to the domain name, and the domain name was registered and is being used in bad faith. All standards must be met for the examiner to find in favor of the complainant.

If the examiner determines that the domain name is non-infringing use, or a fair use, the complaint should be dismissed. However, the URS guidelines do not define "fair use", nor do they indicate which specific jurisdiction's definition of "fair use" should be used.

=== Examples ===
In October 2014 the domain names radisson.club and radissonblu.club were suspended using the URS. Saravanan Dhandapani, acting as the first examiner for the National Arbitration Forum (NAF) and the Asian Domain Name Dispute Resolution Centre (ADNDRC), determined these two domain names infringed on the trademark of Radisson hotels.

== Pricing ==
As of October 2014 registering a single trademark can cost between $95 and $150 for one year. Three year and five year registrations are also available at reduced cost, as are bulk discounts. In general registering a single mark for one year will always be the most expensive option, while registering multiple marks for longer periods will incur greater discount.

Registries pay a one time fee to register between $7,000–10,000.

=== Basic fee structure ===
The basic fee structure is intended for registering small numbers of marks. It is only available to actual trademark holders, and not trademark agents. No bulk discounts are available, but discounts are given for registering marks for longer periods.

- $150 for 1 year
- $435 for 3 years
- $725 for 5 years

=== Advanced fee structure ===
The advanced fee structure is intended for registering large numbers of marks. It is available for trademark holders and agents, and requires the establishment of a prepayment account. Discounts are available when buying in bulk and when purchasing for longer periods.

The advanced fee structure uses a Loyalty program to encourage more trademark registrations. Registrants using it gain points for each registration. As more points are earned successive levels are reached, which decrease the cost of the next batch of registrations. In short, the more registrations a registrant makes, and the longer their duration, the cheaper they get.

== Implementation ==
ICANN has subcontracted out most of the functionality of the Trademark Clearinghouse to IBM and Deloitte. IBM handles the technical implementation, administration and support of the trademark database. Deloitte is responsible for authentication and validation of trademarks.

== Use ==
On March 25, 2013, the Trademark Clearinghouse claimed it had "delivered over 500,000 Trademark Claims notices and prevented over 475,000 trademarked names from being registered."

Uptake on new gTLDs has been brisk, with 426 new gTLDs introduced to the Internet as of October 17, 2014.
