= 9/11 Commission =

U.S. commission to investigate the September 11 attacks (2002–2004)

National Commission on Terrorist Attacks Upon the United States
- Seal of the 9/11 Commission

Agency overview
- Formed: November 27, 2002; 23 years ago
- Dissolved: August 21, 2004; 22 years ago
- Jurisdiction: U.S. government
- Agency executives: Thomas Kean, Chairman; Lee Hamilton; Vice Chairman
- Key document: Intelligence Authorization Act for Fiscal Year 2003
- Website: 9-11commission.gov

The National Commission on Terrorist Attacks Upon the United States, commonly known as the 9/11 Commission, was set up on November 27, 2002, to investigate all aspects of the September 11 attacks, the deadliest terrorist attack in world history. It was created by Congressional legislation, which charged it with preparing "a full and complete account of the circumstances surrounding the September 11 attacks", including preparedness by the U.S. federal government for the attacks, the response following the attacks, and steps that can be taken to guard against a future terrorist attack.

The 9/11 Commission was chaired by Thomas Kean, a two-term former governor of New Jersey from 1982 until 1990, and included five Democrats and five Republicans. The legislation creating the commission was signed into law by President George W. Bush.

The commission's final report, known as The 9/11 Commission Report, was published on July 22, 2004. It is 585 pages, including the findings of the commission's extensive interviews and testimony received during its investigation. The primary conclusion in the 9/11 Report is that failures of the U.S. Central Intelligence Agency (CIA) and Federal Bureau of Investigation (FBI) permitted the September 11 terrorist attacks to occur and that wiser and more aggressive actions by these agencies could potentially have prevented the attack.

After the publication of its final report, the commission closed on August 21, 2004.

== History ==
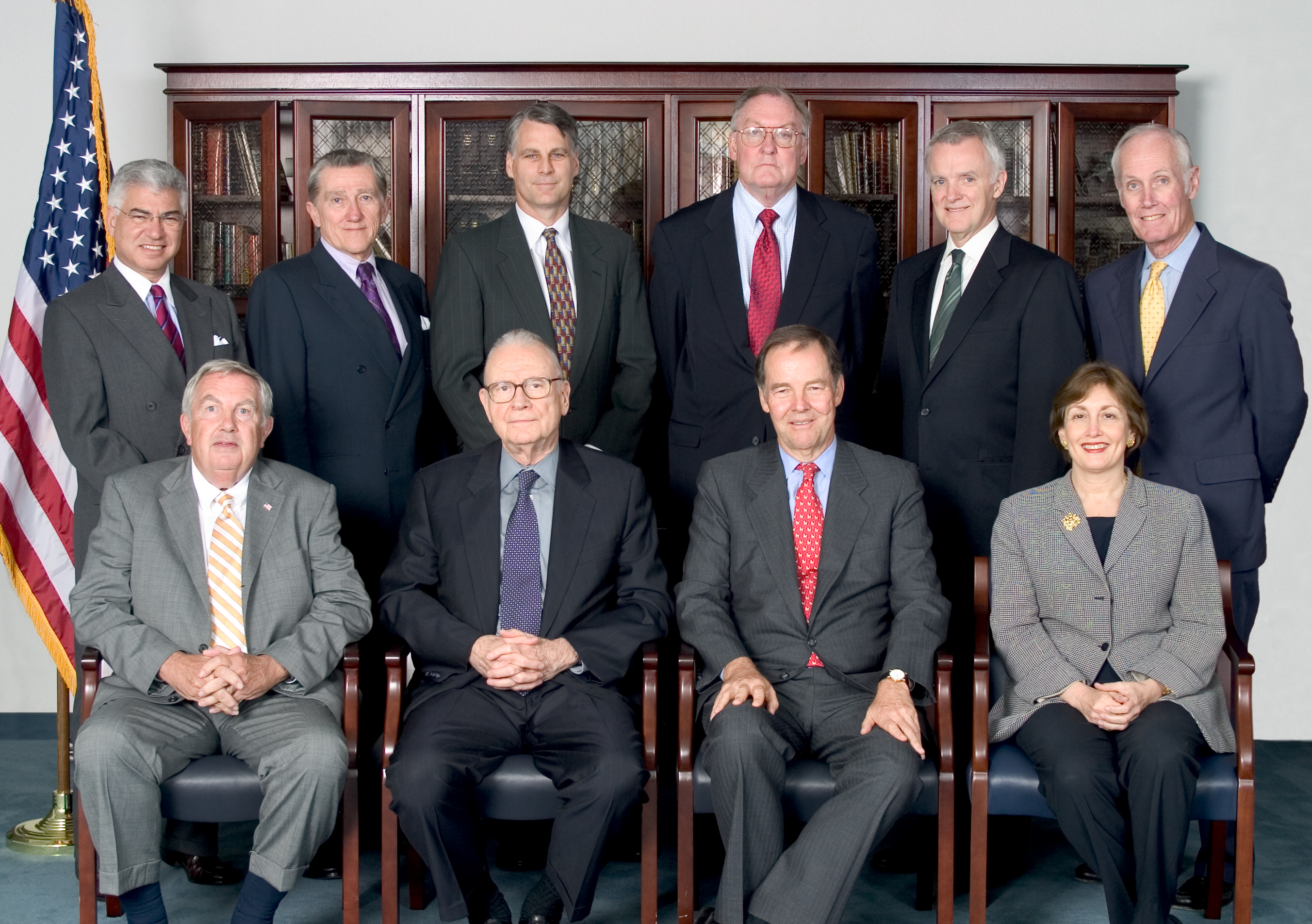
Members of the 9/11 Commission

The National Commission on Terrorist Attacks Upon the United States was established on November 27, 2002, by President George W. Bush and the United States Congress, with former secretary of state Henry Kissinger initially appointed to head the commission. However, Kissinger resigned only weeks after being appointed, to avoid conflicts of interest. Former U.S. senator George Mitchell was originally appointed as the vice chairman, but he stepped down on December 10, 2002, not wanting to sever ties to his law firm. On December 15, 2002, Bush appointed former New Jersey governor Tom Kean to head the commission.

By the spring of 2003, the commission was off to a slow start, needing additional funding to help it meet its target day for the final report, of May 27, 2004. In late March, the Bush administration agreed to provide an additional $9 million for the commission, though this was $2 million short of what the commission requested. The first hearings were held from March 31 to April 1, 2003, in New York City.

== Members ==
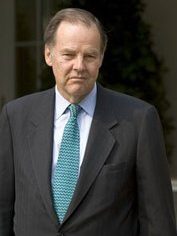
9/11 Commission chairman Thomas Kean

- Thomas Kean (chairman), Republican, former governor of New Jersey
- Lee Hamilton (vice chairman), Democrat, former U.S. representative for the 9th congressional district of Indiana
- Richard Ben-Veniste, Democrat, attorney and former chief of the Watergate Task Force of the Watergate Special Prosecutor's Office
- Max Cleland, Democrat, former U.S. senator from Georgia. Resigned in December 2003, stating that "the White House has played cover-up".
- Fred F. Fielding, Republican, attorney and former White House counsel
- Jamie Gorelick, Democrat, former U.S. deputy attorney general in the Clinton administration
- Slade Gorton, Republican, former U.S. senator from Washington
- Bob Kerrey, Democrat, President of the New School University and former U.S. senator from Nebraska. He replaced Max Cleland as a Democratic commissioner, after Cleland's resignation.
- John Lehman, Republican, former secretary of the Navy
- Tim Roemer, Democrat, former U.S. representative for the 3rd congressional district of Indiana
- Jim Thompson, Republican, former governor of Illinois

The members of the commission's staff included:

- Philip D. Zelikow, executive director
- Christopher A. Kojm, deputy executive director
- Daniel Marcus, general counsel
- John Farmer Jr., senior counsel
- Dieter Snell, senior counsel
- Janice Kephart, counsel
- Alvin S. Felzenberg, spokesman

U.S. president George W. Bush initially appointed former U.S. secretary of state and national security advisor Henry Kissinger as the commission's chairman. Following his appointment, Congress insisted that Kissinger disclose the names of his clients at Kissinger Associates, a New York City-based consulting firm he ran. The firm has long been discreet about its clientele. Kissinger refused to provide Congress with the names of his clients, and resigned as the commission's chairman. Bush then appointed Thomas Kean, a two-term governor of New Jersey from 1982 to 1990, as Kissinger's replacement.

== Testimony ==
Present U.S. federal government officials who were called to testify before the 9/11 Commission included:

- George W. Bush, U.S. president testified but not under oath in a session that was not officially transcribed because the White House considered it a "private meeting" in which highly classified information would be discussed. Bush asked that his testimony be limited to one hour. However, the meeting lasted for three hours and ten minutes. Bush's testimony took place in the Oval Office. Initially, Bush insisted that he would testify only to the chairman and vice chairman of the 9/11 Commission, but later agreed to testify before the full panel.
- Dick Cheney, U.S. vice president testified but not under oath. The session was not officially transcribed because the White House considered it a "private meeting" in which highly classified information would be discussed. Cheney's testimony took place in the Oval Office.
- George Tenet, director of the Central Intelligence Agency
- Colin Powell, Secretary of State
- Donald Rumsfeld, Secretary of Defense
- Condoleezza Rice, National Security Advisor
- Richard Armitage, Deputy Secretary of State
- Paul Wolfowitz, Deputy Secretary of Defense
- Tom Ridge, Secretary of Homeland Security and former governor of Pennsylvania
- John Ashcroft, Attorney General

Former federal government officials who were called to testify before the 9/11 Commission included:

- Bill Clinton, former president, testified in private separately from Al Gore. Clinton's testimony was recorded and not limited in time.
- Al Gore, former vice president, testified in private separately from Bill Clinton. Gore's testimony was recorded and not limited in time.
- Madeleine Albright, former secretary of state
- William Cohen, former secretary of defense
- Sandy Berger, former national security advisor
- Richard A. Clarke, former chief counter-terrorism adviser on the National Security Council in the George W. Bush and Bill Clinton administrations
- Rudy Giuliani, former mayor of New York City
- Janet Reno, former attorney general
- Sibel Edmonds, former FBI translator

President George W. Bush, Vice President Dick Cheney, former president Bill Clinton, and former vice president Al Gore all gave private testimony. President Bush and Vice President Cheney insisted on testifying together and not under oath, while Clinton and Gore met with the panel separately. As National Security Advisor, Condoleezza Rice claimed that she was not required to testify under oath because the position of national security advisor is an advisory role, independent of authority over a bureaucracy and does not require confirmation by the Senate. Legal scholars disagree on the legitimacy of her claim. Eventually, Rice testified publicly and under oath.

== Report ==
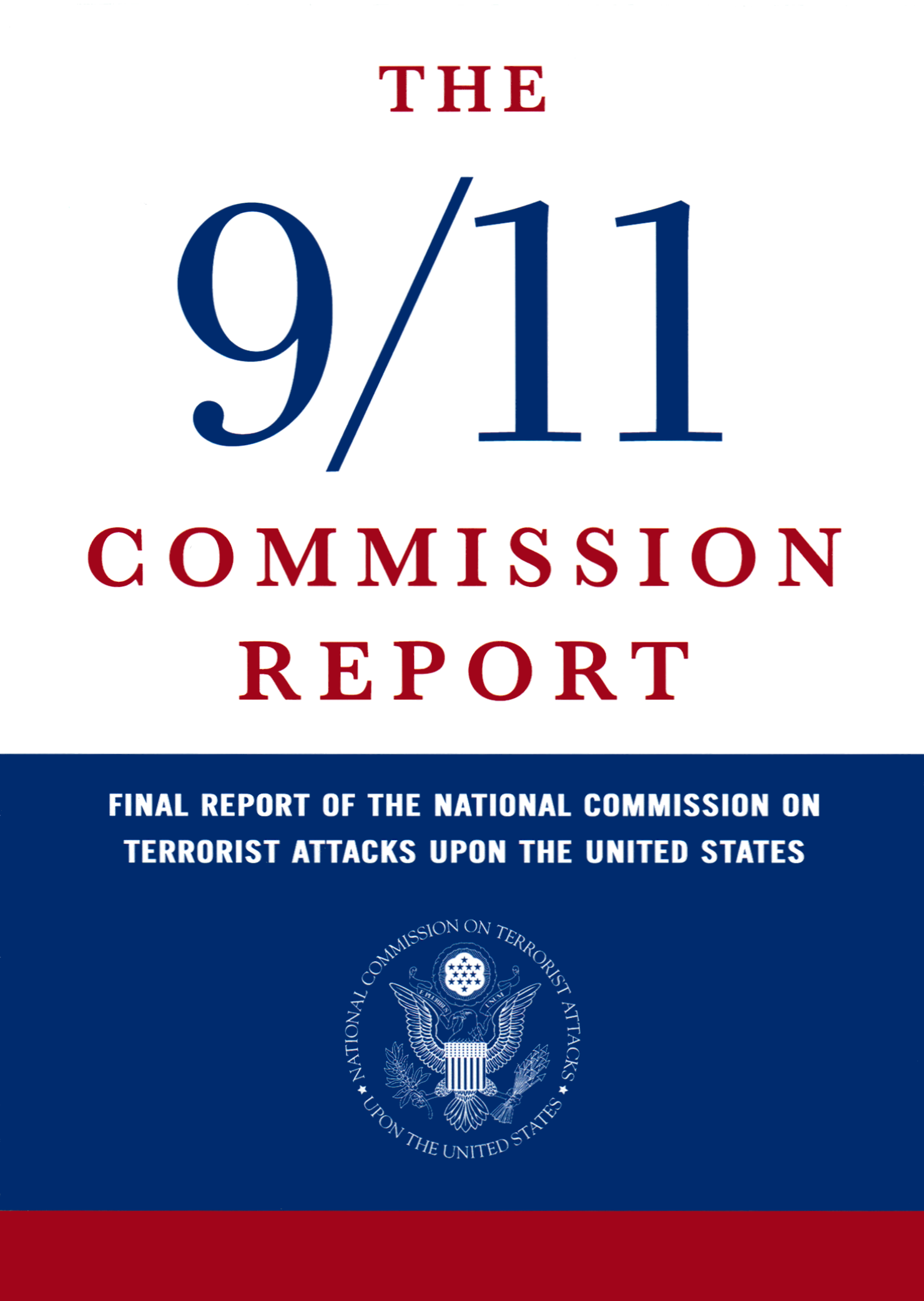
The cover of The 9/11 Commission Report, a 585-page report issued July 22, 2004

The commission issued its final report, The 9/11 Commission Report, on July 22, 2004. After its release, 9/11 Commission chair Thomas Kean declared that both presidents Bill Clinton and George W. Bush were "not well served" by the Federal Bureau of Investigation and the Central Intelligence Agency. The commission interviewed over 1,200 people in 10 countries and reviewed over two and a half million pages of documents, including some closely guarded classified national security documents. Before it was released by the commission, the final public report was screened for any potentially classified information and edited as necessary.

The commission later released several supplemental reports on the terrorists' financing, travel, and other matters.

== Findings and responses ==
=== NORAD falsehoods ===
John Farmer Jr., senior counsel to the 9/11 Commission, stated that the 9/11 Commission, "discovered that ... what government and military officials had told Congress, the Commission, the media, and the public about who knew what when — was almost entirely, and inexplicably, untrue." Farmer said, "At some level of the government, at some point in time, a decision was made not to tell the truth about the national response to the attacks on the morning of 9/11 ... The [NORAD] tapes told a radically different story from what had been told to us and the public." Thomas Kean, the head of the 9/11 Commission, concurred, saying, "We to this day don't know why NORAD told us what they told us, it was just so far from the truth."

=== CIA withheld information ===
Central Intelligence Agency (CIA) director George Tenet misled the commission and was "obviously not forthcoming" in his testimony to the commission, according to commission chair Thomas Kean. An FBI agent named Doug Miller had been working inside Bin Laden Issue Station, a unit of the CIA dedicated to tracking the activities of Osama bin Laden and his associates. By the spring of 2000, the Bin Laden Issue Station learned that Khalid al-Mihdhar, a Saudi national who was an al-Qaeda member, and Nawaf al-Hazmi, another Saudi who at that time was a suspected al-Qaeda operative, had entered the U.S. and were living under their own names in Southern California.

Miller wanted to inform the FBI of their entry and presence in the U.S., but the CIA blocked Miller's efforts to do so. Miller's contemporaneous draft cable to the FBI reporting on this, which the CIA prevented Miller from sending at the time, was found much later. Al-Mihdhar and al-Hazmi were both hijackers of American Airlines Flight 77. The CIA then failed to reveal to the commission that over a year before the attack, it had been tracking the two hijackers' entry into and whereabouts inside the United States. Co-chair Kean believes the CIA's failure to be forthcoming with this information to the commission was deliberate, not a mistake, saying: "Oh, it wasn't careless oversight. It was purposeful. No question about that in my mind ... In the DNA of these organizations was secrecy."

== Criticism ==
The commission was criticized for alleged conflicts of interest on the part of commissioners and staff, including those of Philip D. Zelikow, the commission's executive director who co-authored a book with Condoleezza Rice. The commission's final report, The 9/11 Commission Report, has been the subject of criticism by both commissioners themselves and by others.

== Legacy ==
Months after the commission had officially issued its report and ceased its functions, Thomas Kean, the commission's chair, and other commissioners toured the country to draw attention to the recommendations of the commission for reducing the terror risk, claiming that some of their recommendations were being ignored. Kean and vice-chair Lee Hamilton wrote a book about the constraints they faced as commissioners, titled Without Precedent: The Inside Story of the 9/11 Commission.

The book was released on August 15, 2006, and chronicles the work of Kean and Hamilton on the commission. In the book, Kean and Hamilton charge that the 9/11 Commission was "set up to fail", and write that the commission was so frustrated with repeated misstatements by officials from the Pentagon and the Federal Aviation Administration during the investigation that it considered a separate investigation into possible obstruction of justice by Pentagon and FAA officials.

== See also ==
- Warren Commission
- 9/11 conspiracy theories
