= Fatimata Touré =

Malian activist

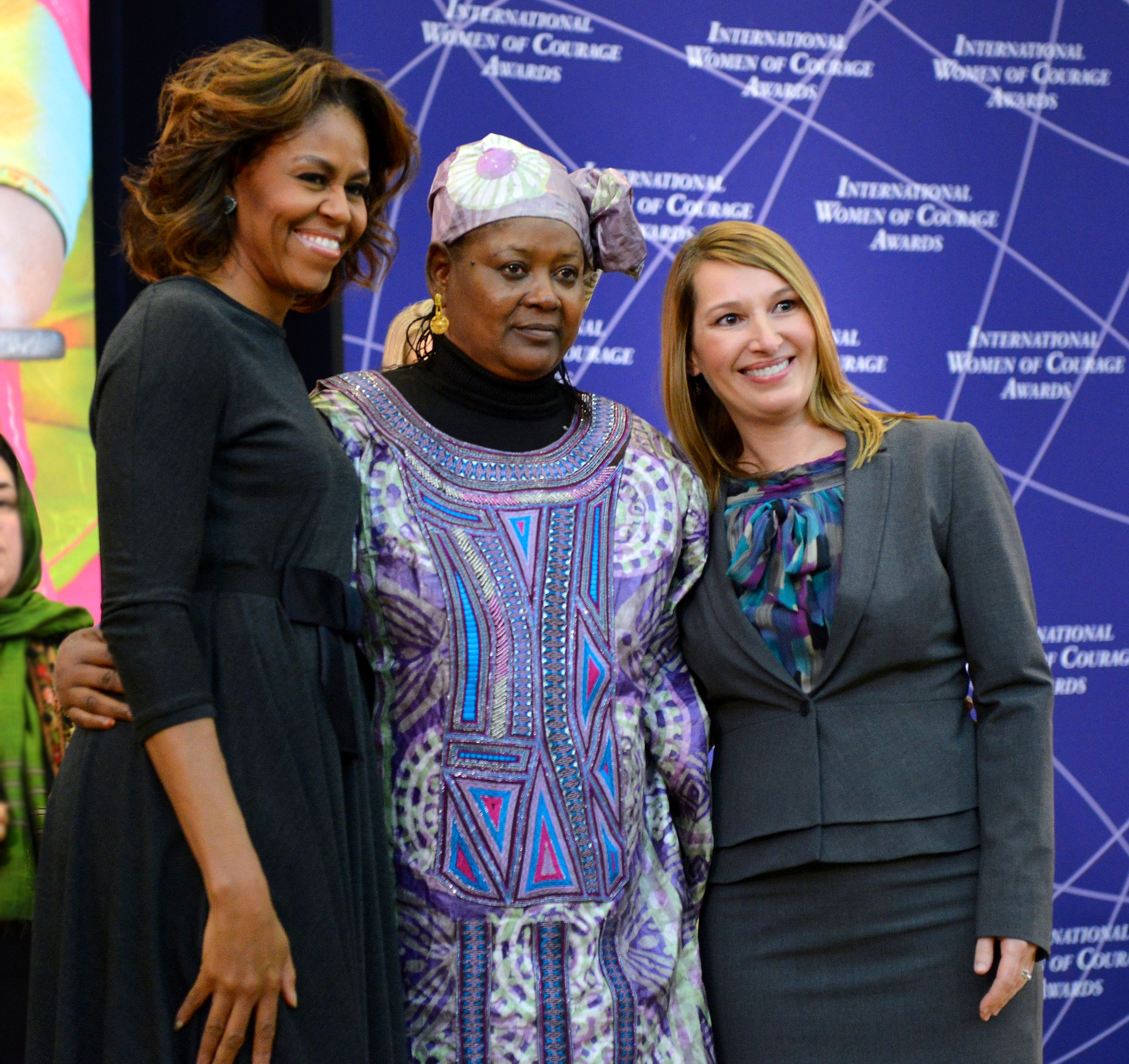
International Women of Courage Award, 2014. United States First Lady Michelle Obama and Deputy Secretary Higginbottom with Fatimata Touré.

Fatimata Touré is a women's rights activist and the head of the Regional Forum on Reconciliation and Peace in Gao, Mali. She is also the head of Women's Action, Research, Study and Training Group, which works against fistula.

During the conflict in the north of Mali in the late 1990s, Touré and her colleagues at the Association of Women for Peace and Development persuaded the Touareg rebels to attend ceasefire talks, resulting in discussions and some localized ceasefires. Touré was recognized for her peace work by her inclusion as one of the 1000 Peace Women, a group nomination of 1000 women peace makers for the 2005 Nobel Peace Prize. During the 2012 and 2013 occupation of Mali, she helped fistula patients relocate and find medical help after a hospital in Gao was attacked, as well as giving care and shelter to those forced into marriages or raped. She also publicly spoke out against gender-based violence. She documented the violence that was occurring, even as her own home was attacked.

She received a 2014 International Women of Courage award. Samantha Power, as America's Ambassador to the United Nations, mentioned her in a speech she gave in Mali in 2014.
