= Siavash Shahshahani =

Iranian mathematician (born 1942)

Siavash Mirshams Shahshahani
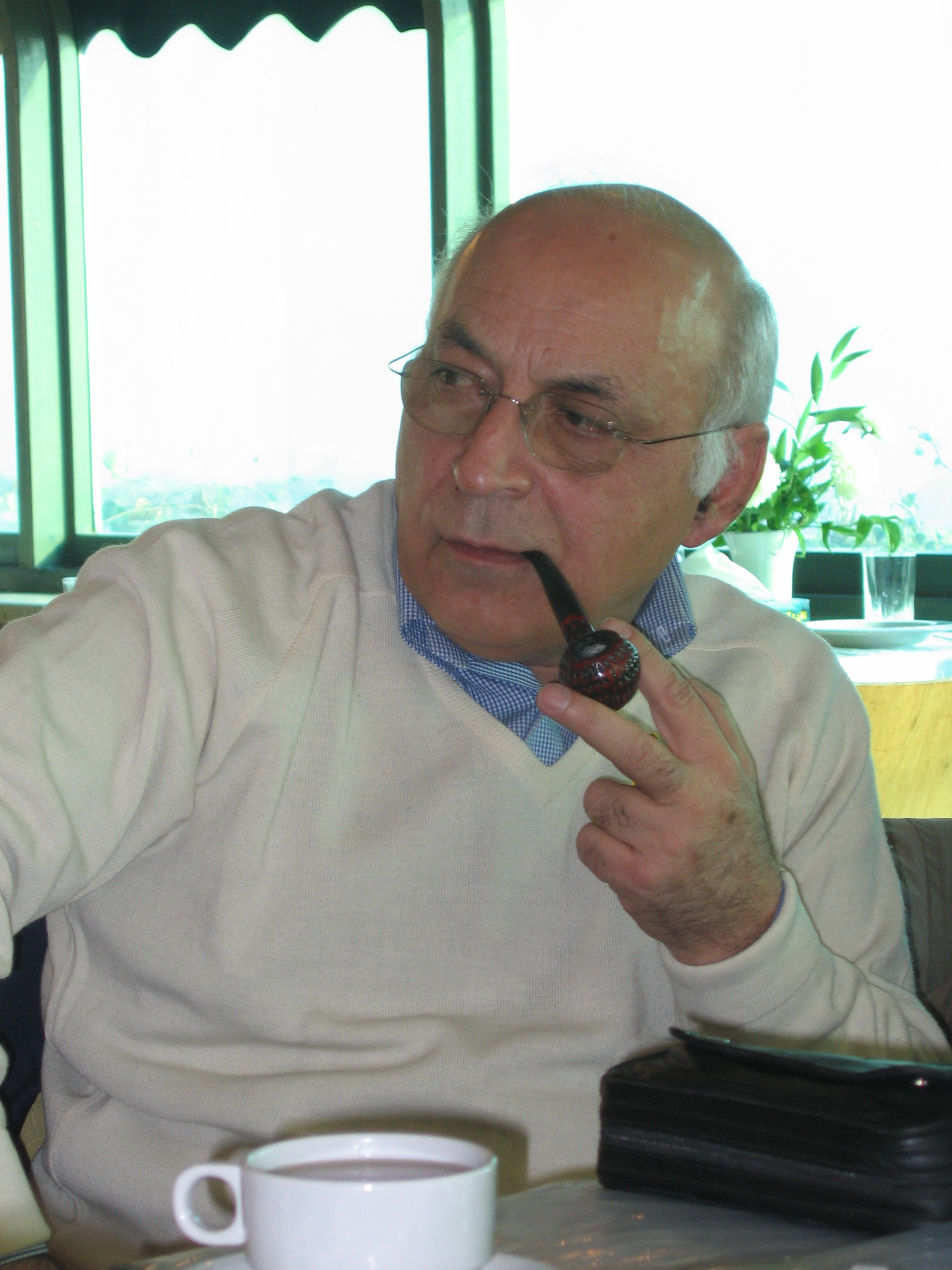
- Siavash Mirshams Shahshahani in 2004
- Born: Siavash Mirshams Shahshahani; 31 May 1942 (age 84); Iran
- Education: University of California, Berkeley
- Awards: Lasting Figures (2003)
- Scientific career
- Fields: Geometry; Topology; Differentiable manifold
- Workplaces: Sharif University of Technology; University of Michigan; University of Wisconsin–Madison; Northwestern University; Institute for Research in Fundamental Sciences
- Thesis: Global Theory of Second Order Ordinary Differential Equations on Manifolds (1969)
- Doctoral advisor: Stephen Smale
- Website: sharif.ir/~shahshah/

Siavash Mirshams Shahshahani (Persian: سیاوش میرشمس شهشهانی; born May 31, 1942) is an Iranian mathematician. He is a professor of mathematics and head of Mathematical Sciences Department at Sharif University of Technology. He headed up the IRNIC registry for the .ir ccTLD until his retirement from that position in late 2008. He has also served as a director of APTLD (the Asia Pacific Top Level Domain Association) between 2007 and his retirement from that position in February 2009.

== Education ==
Shahshahani completed his PhD under the supervision of Stephen Smale at the University of California at Berkeley in 1969. He has since devoted a substantial part of his career to mathematical education.

== Books ==
- Shahshahani, Siavash. An Introductory Course on Differentiable Manifolds. USA: Dover Publications.
- Shahshahani, Siavash. Differential and Integral Calculus Volume I (in Persian). Iran: Fatemi Publishing House.
- Shahshahani, Siavash. Differential and Integral Calculus Volume II (in Persian). Iran: Fatemi Publishing House.
