= Les Afriques =

Swiss newspaper

- Type: Weekly newspaper
- Format: Tabloid
- Owner: Les Afriques Editions et Communication SA
- Publisher: Dominique Flaux
- Editor: Adama Wade, Chérif Elvalide Seye
- Founded: 2007; 19 years ago
- Language: French
- Headquarters: Carouge, Geneva
- Country: Switzerland
- Price: FCFA 1500 Afrique CFA €1,9 Belgique, Luxembourg, France, Suisse $ CAD 3,3 Canada
- Website: www.lesafriques.com

Les Afriques is a weekly economical and financial African newspaper. In 2007, it claimed to be the first Pan-African financial newspaper. It is published weekly and is available in almost all French-speaking countries.

== History ==
The newspaper started its publication in July 2007. Its launch was announced on the French-language TV Journal de Léman bleu and on several specialised African websites.

After a first journal and a necessary period of adaptation using a franchise system, the journal Les Afriques launched local editions for Morocco, Senegal and Cameroon.

== Objectives ==
In order to balance the views of the "old continent", the journalists are based in Africa (Morocco, Senegal and Algeria) and are highly respected in the African financial community.

== Journalists ==
=== Adama Wade, Morocco ===
Adama Wade, a Mauritanian national, established in Casablanca for at least thirteen years. He has flourished as a journalist in the Economic and Financial sections in the Moroccan press.

=== Chérif Elvalide Seye, Senegal ===
He was a special advisor to the communication for president Abdoulaye Wade 2000–2002, and he has created or managed various media entities in his country. Chérif Seye died on June 18, 2012, in Nairobi, Kenya.
