= Gregory F. Treverton =

American foreign policy executive

Gregory Treverton

Chair of the National Intelligence Council
- In office July 6, 2014 – July 5, 2017
- Preceded by: Christopher A. Kojm
- Succeeded by: Amy McAuliffe

Personal details
- Born: Colorado, U.S.
- Party: Democratic
- Education: Princeton University (BA); Harvard University (MPP, PhD)

Gregory F. Treverton is an American foreign policy and intelligence executive. Treverton was the chairperson of the U.S. National Intelligence Council from 2014-2017 and vice chair from 1993-1995. He is also a professor at the University of Southern California and a visiting senior fellow at the Swedish Defence University.

== Biography ==
From 2007 to 2014, Treverton was a Senior Fellow, Stockholm, Sweden. Between 2000 and 2014, he served at the Rand Corporation as the Director for the Center for Global Risk and Security (2009-2014), Director of Intelligence Policy Center (2004-2005), and a senior researcher (2000-2009) at the Rand Corporation. From 1998 to 2000 he served at the Pacific Council on International Policy, as president and before Vice President and Director of Studies. He is currently a member of the Advisory Board at the Oxford Analytica,

Treverton graduated summa cum laude with an A.B. from the Princeton School of Public and International Affairs at Princeton University in 1969 after completing a 181-page-long senior thesis titled "Politics and Petroleum: The International Petroleum Company in Peru."

He received an M.P.P. from the John F. Kennedy School of Government at Harvard University in 1972 and a Ph.D. from Harvard University in 1975 after completing a doctoral dissertation titled "Managing the politics and economics of alliance: the balance of payments and American forces in Germany."

Treverton was one of the 51 former U.S. intelligence officials who signed the October 19, 2020, letter that said the Hunter Biden laptop story "has all the classic earmarks of a Russian information operation." While the letter did not claim the laptop itself contained Russian disinformation, and admitted no specific evidence of the operation existed, later evidence verified some content as authentic, and there was no evidence of Russian disinformation on the laptop.

In 2021, Treverton was implicated in a dispute with Oxford University Press and a former graduate student regarding his 2015 book National Intelligence and Science: Beyond the Great Divide in Analysis and Policy (Oxford University Press) found he had plagiarized a substantial portion of a chapter in his book from white papers by the graduate student, who was eventually named a co-author of the chapter.

== Bibliography ==
Publications include:

- Telling Truth to Power: A History of the National Intelligence Council, (edited, with Robert Hutchings) (Oxford University Press, 2019)
- National Intelligence and Science: Beyond the Great Divide in Analysis and Policy, (with Wilhelm Agrell) (Oxford University Press, 2015)
- Dividing Divided States (University of Pennsylvania Press, 2014)
- Making Strategic Analysis Matter (with Jeremy Ghez) (CF-287-NIC, RAND, 2012)
- How Americans Will Live and Work in 2020: A Workshop Exploring Key Trends and Philanthropic Responses (with others) (CF-299, RAND, 2012)
- Threats without Threateners? Exploring Intersections of Threats to the Global Commons and National Security (with others) (OP-360, RAND, 2011)
- Moving toward the Future of Policing (with others) (MG-1102, RAND, 2011)
- Making Policy in the Shadow of the Future (OP-298-RC, RAND Corporation, 2010)
- National Intelligence Systems: Current Research and Future Prospects, (edited, with Wilhelm Agrell) (Cambridge University Press, 2009)
- Intelligence for an Age of Terror (Cambridge University Press, 2009)
- Film Piracy, Organized Crime and Terrorism (with others) (RAND, 2009)
- Reorganizing U.S. Domestic Intelligence: Assessing the Options (RAND, 2008)
- Assessing the Tradecraft of Intelligence Analysis (with C. Bryan Gabbard) (TR-293, RAND Corporation, 2008)
- New Challenges, New Tools for Defense Decisionmaking (edited, with Stuart Johnson and Martin Libicki) (RAND, 2003)
- Reshaping National Intelligence for an Age of Information (Cambridge University Press, 2001)
- Latin America in a New World (edited, with Abraham F. Lowenthal) (Westview Press, 1994)
- Making American Foreign Policy (casebook) (Prentice-Hall, 1993)
- America, Germany and the Future of Europe (Princeton University Press, 1992)
- Rethinking America's Security (edited, with Graham T. Allison) (W.W. Norton, 1992)
- The Shape of the New Europe (edited) (Council on Foreign Relations, 1992)
- Alternative to Intervention: A New U.S.-Latin American Security Relationship (edited, with Richard J. Bloomfield) (Lynne Rienner, 1990)
- Europe and America Beyond 2000 (edited) (Council on Foreign Relations, 1989)
- Covert Action: The Limits of Intervention in the Postwar World (Basic Books, 1987)
- Europe, America and South Africa, (edited) (Council on Foreign Relations, 1988)
