= Commissariat à l'Energie Solaire =

The Commissariat à l'Energie Solaire (ComES) was the French solar energy authority that existed from 1978 to 1982. The a public scientific and industrial entity, was set up in 1978 to promote a comprehensive energy policy based on energy savings, on efficient energy management, and on renewable sources of energy (photovoltaic, solar thermal, wind, hydraulic, biomass). It was supervised by the Ministry for Industry and by the Ministry for Research.

The first Managing Director and Chief Executive of ComES was M. Henry Durand, an engineer. As a national agency, COMES defined, financed and evaluated projects using renewable energies. Shortly after this agency was created, its Department of International Affairs was set up (by Jean-Jacques Subrenat, a career diplomat), and became involved in a number of projects, both multilateral and in the context of bilateral relations between France and partner countries.

A new distribution of tasks among public agencies led to the French Solar Energy Authority being discontinued: its tasks were taken over, and expanded, by the Agence de l'Environnement et de la Maîtrise de l'Energie (ADEME) the Agency for the Environment and Energy Management which, compared with its predecessors, has a wider purview which includes the environment.
