= Country Code Names Supporting Organization =

The Country Code Names Supporting Organization (ccNSO) of the Internet Corporation for Assigned Names and Numbers (ICANN) is the policy-development body for a narrow range of global issues regarding country code top-level domains (ccTLD) within the ICANN structure.

Established under the bylaws of ICANN, it is responsible for developing and recommending global policies relating to ccTLD to the ICANN Board of Directors, including the name-related activities of ccTLDs and coordinating with other ICANN Supporting Organizations, committees, and constituencies under ICANN.
