= Désirée Miloshevic =

Internet public servant

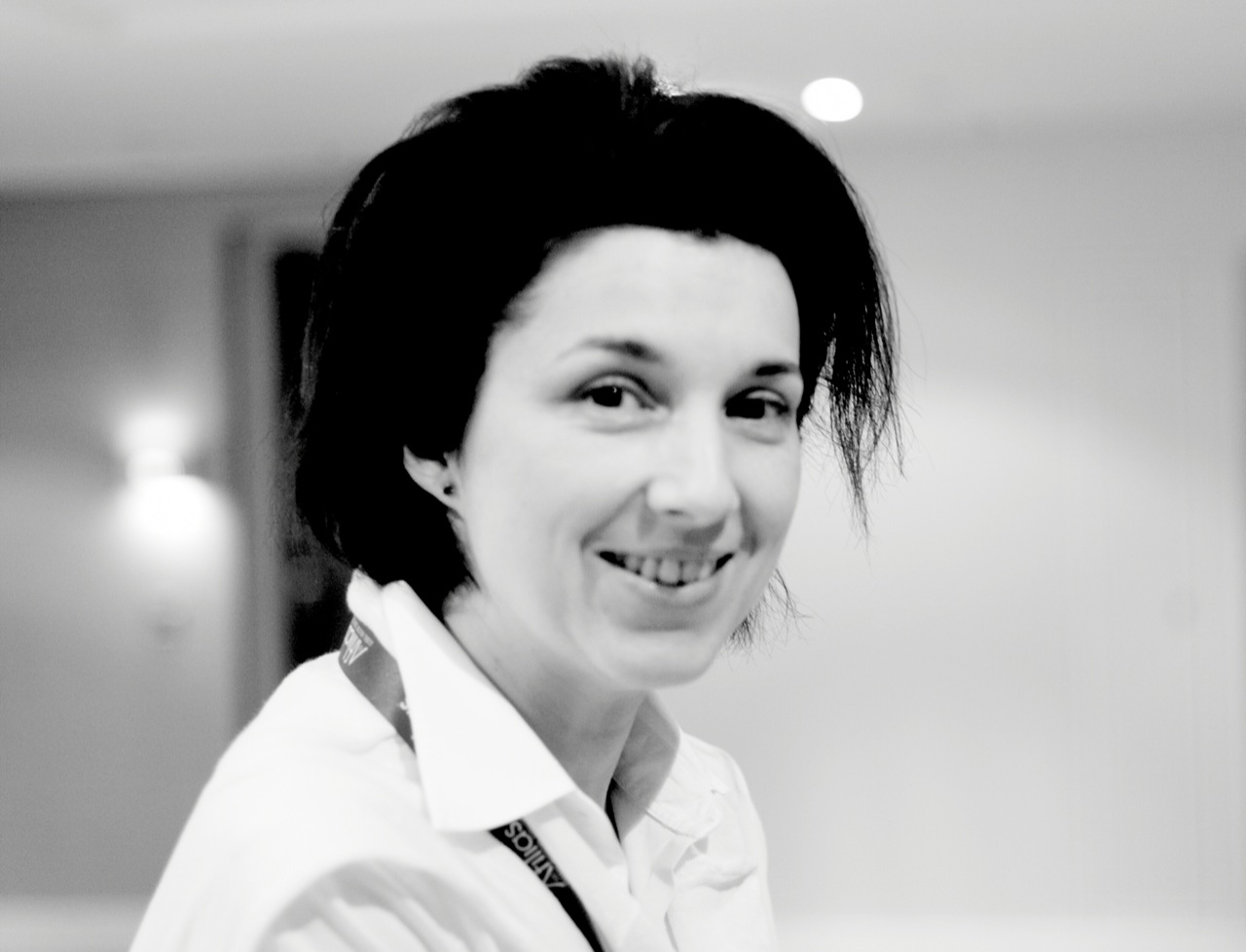
Désirée Zeljka Miloshevic

Désirée Zeljka Miloshevic is an Internet public servant, and was a special advisor to the chair of the United Nations' Internet Governance Forum Multi-stakeholder Advisory Group. Additionally, she is Senior Public Policy and International Affairs Advisor in Europe for Afilias, the domain name registry.

== Early life ==
Miloshevic studied English Literature at the University of Belgrade Faculty of Philology before starting her internet career at the then newly formed British service provider Demon Internet in 1993.

== Affiliations and positions ==
- Special Adviser to the Chair of Internet Governance Forum Advisory Group (2006–2009)
- Member of the Internet Society Board of Trustees (2004–2010) (2013–2019)
- Member of the CPSR Board (2004–2010)
- Member of the ICANN ccNSO
- Member of the IADAS Webby Awards
- Member of the Irish ENUM Policy Advisory Board
- Member of the Open Rights Group Advisory Council
- Member of the CC UK Advisory Board
- Chair of the SHARE Foundation Board of Directors (2018–present)
