= Wait Listing Service =

Ability to option an already registered domain name

A wait-listing service (WLS) provided by a domain name registry provides the ability to option a domain name that is already registered. The option-holder then has the ability to have first rights to that domain name if the current registrant should cancel their registration.

Taking such an option is no guarantee a person will be able to register the domain name, merely that the person will be able to if the domain name becomes otherwise available. If the existing holder continues to renew their domain name, the option-holder will never get the domain through the procedure.

A move to introduce this service by ICANN-accredited registries drew fire in 2003 as anti-competitive. Currently domain name registrars provide a similar, non-guaranteed service by continually querying the registry if a domain name is available. If it should become available, the registrar quickly tries to register the domain to the new party. The consequence of this process is that, if multiple registrars are vying for the domain, the beneficiary of the new domain name may come down to luck and circumstance.

== ICANN proposal ==
The Waiting List Service was proposed as an ICANN service by Verisign on March 21, 2002, and requested ICANN to include the WLS in the .com and .net registry agreements for a $35 subscription fee.
