= Fatimata Seye Sylla =

Senegalese politician

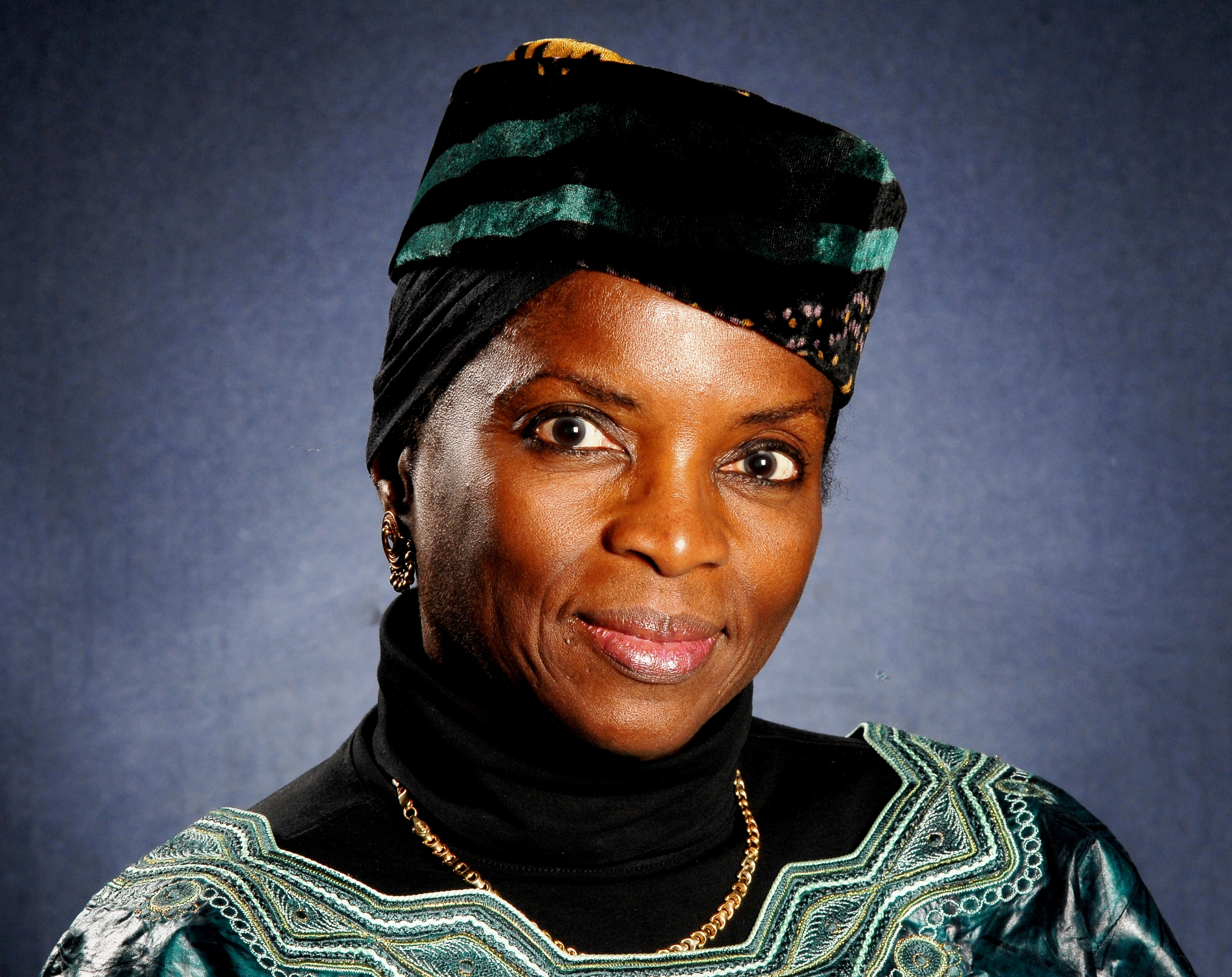
- Fatimata Seye Sylla
- Education: University of Le Havre; Massachusetts Institute of Technology

Fatimata Seye Sylla is the director of Senegal's Digital Freedom Initiative, a council member for the Free and Open Source Software Foundation for Africa, and the Senegal National Coordinator of the African Civil Society for the Information Society.

== Career Background ==
She is a former member of the At-Large Advisory Committee for ICANN, where she represented Senegal, and advocated there for greater involvement of the developing world with Internet governance. She also served on the board of the CATIA (Catalyzing Access To ICTS in Africa) initiative, a program that worked to support ICT initiatives and their directors across African countries.

Best known for championing the use of information and communications technology (ICT) in the Senegalese education system; Seye Sylla began the first nationwide program to introduce ICT in Senegalese schools. She has also worked as an Internet access advocate with the United Nations, the Panos Network, and the International Development Research Centre. Her activism in Senegal has also included work with the Internet Society and founding OSIRIS, a pro-ICT initiative.

== Education ==
Seye Sylla was educated at the University of Le Havre, where she earned a degree in computer science; CESAG Dakar, where she earned a degree in Management; and MIT, where she earned a Master of Science. Her writing includes analysis of the difference between boys and girls in how they use ICT and development of methods for attracting more young women to technology and fields where they are underrepresented. These include properly training women and girls via the education system, encouraging women to build websites, involving the government and policymakers, and having telecommunications companies provide discounts as an incentive for women.

== Publications & Recognition ==
- Computers and literacy in Senegal
- Speaker at AIS 2018 at Dakar
