= ICANN =

American nonprofit organization

Internet Corporation for Assigned Names and Numbers
- Abbreviation: ICANN
- Founded: September 30, 1998; 28 years ago
- Type: 501(c)(3) organization
- Tax ID no.: 95-4712218
- Purpose: Manage Internet Protocol numbers and Domain Name System root
- Headquarters: Los Angeles, California, United States
- Key people: Kurt Erik Lindqvist (CEO and president); Tripti Sinha (Chair of the Board); Jon Postel (founder)
- Employees: 428
- Website: icann.org

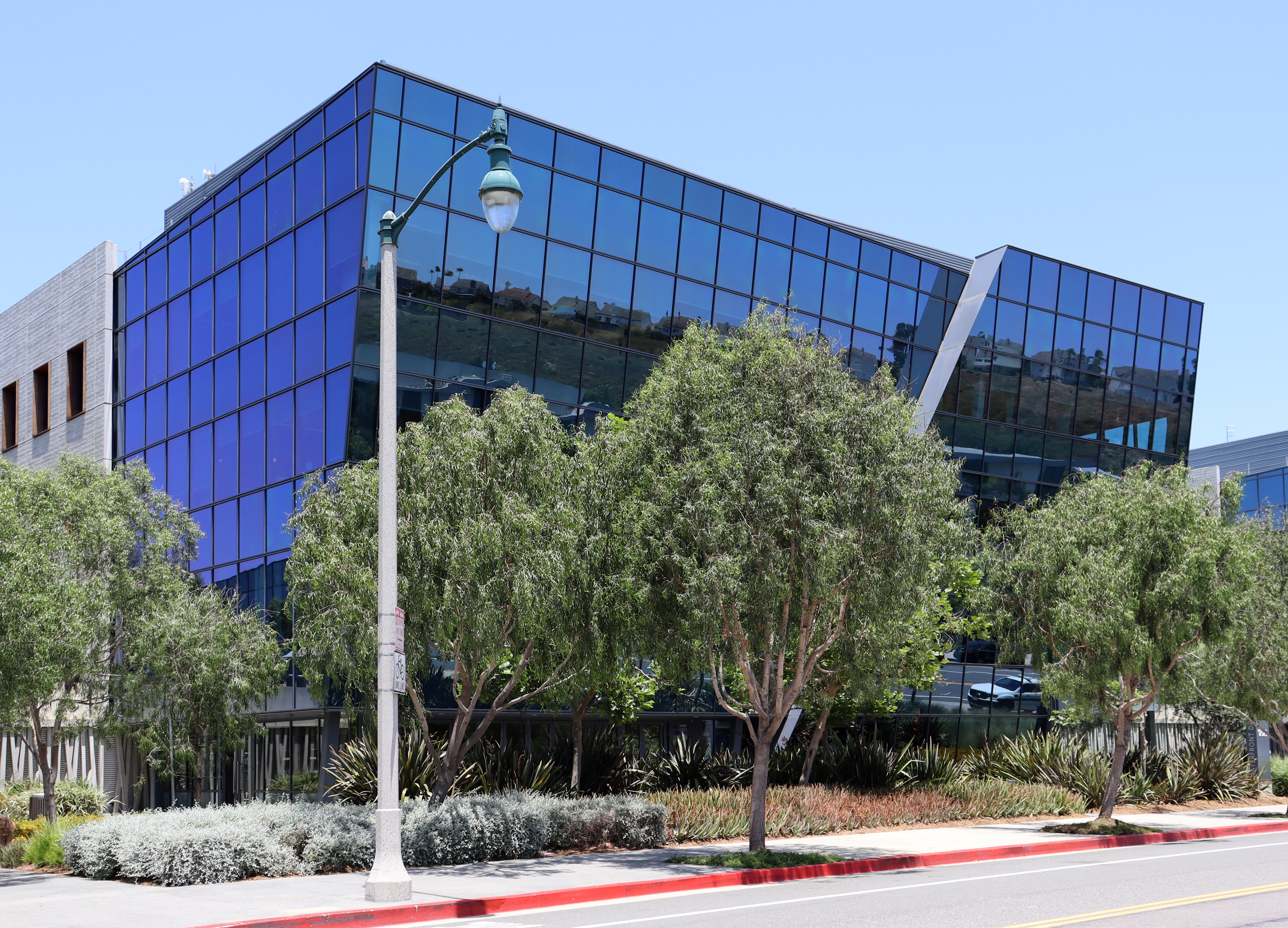
ICANN headquarters in the Playa Vista neighborhood of Los Angeles

The Internet Corporation for Assigned Names and Numbers (ICANN /ˈaɪkæn/ EYE-kan) is a global multistakeholder group and nonprofit organization headquartered in the United States, responsible for coordinating the maintenance and procedures of several databases related to the namespaces and numerical spaces of the Internet, while also ensuring the Internet's smooth, secure, and stable operation. ICANN performs the actual technical maintenance (work) of the Central Internet Address pools and DNS root zone registries pursuant to the Internet Assigned Numbers Authority (IANA) function contract. The contract regarding the IANA stewardship functions between ICANN and the National Telecommunications and Information Administration (NTIA) of the United States Department of Commerce ended on October 1, 2016, formally transitioning the functions to the global multistakeholder community. It was created in 1969, but only available to academic research institutions, in 1998 with the rapid growth of the internet and e-commerce, the State of California legalized the process, made procedural regulations to obtain domains and the US Department of Commerce followed through with similar regulations, the United Nations became very involved as far as managing the registration for countries with low literacy rates.

Much of its work has concerned the Internet's global Domain Name System (DNS), including policy development for internationalization of the DNS, introduction of new generic top-level domains (TLDs), and the operation of root name servers; the numbering facilities ICANN manages include the Internet Protocol (IP) address spaces for IPv4 and v6 in addition to the assignment of address blocks to regional Internet registries (RIRs).

ICANN's primary principles of operation have been described as helping preserve the operational stability of the Internet, promoting competition, achieving broad representation of the global Internet community, and developing policies appropriate to its mission through bottom-up, consensus-based processes. The organization has often included the motto "One World. One Internet." on annual reports beginning in 2010, on less formal publications, and on its official website.

ICANN was officially incorporated in the state of California on September 30, 1998, with entrepreneur and philanthropist Esther Dyson as founding chairwoman. Originally headquartered in Marina del Rey in the same building as the University of Southern California's Information Sciences Institute (ISI), its offices are now in the Playa Vista neighborhood of Los Angeles.

== History ==
Before the establishment of ICANN, the IANA function of administering RIRs (including the distributing top-level domains and IP addresses) was performed by Jon Postel, a computer science researcher who had been involved in the creation of ARPANET, first at UCLA and then at USC-ISI. In 1997 Postel testified before Congress that this had come about as a "side task" to this research work. The Information Sciences Institute was funded by the U.S. Department of Defense, as was SRI International's Network Information Center, which also performed some assigned name functions.

As the Internet grew and expanded globally, the U.S. Department of Commerce initiated a process to establish a new organization to perform the IANA functions. On January 30, 1998, the National Telecommunications and Information Administration (NTIA), an agency of the U.S. Department of Commerce, issued for comment, "A Proposal to Improve the Technical Management of Internet Names and Addresses." The proposed rule making, or "Green Paper", was published in the Federal Register on February 20, 1998, providing opportunity for public comment. NTIA received more than 650 comments as of March 23, 1998, when the comment period closed.

The Green Paper proposed certain actions designed to privatize the management of Internet names and addresses in a manner that allows for the development of competition and facilitates global participation in Internet management. The Green Paper proposed for discussion a variety of issues relating to DNS management including private sector creation of a new not-for-profit corporation (the "new corporation") managed by a globally and functionally representative board of directors. ICANN was formed in response to this policy. ICANN managed the Internet Assigned Numbers Authority (IANA) under contract to the United States Department of Commerce (DOC) and pursuant to an agreement with the IETF.

ICANN is a public-benefit nonprofit corporation "organized under the California Nonprofit Public Benefit Corporation Law for charitable and public purposes." ICANN was established in California due to the presence of Postel, who was a founder of ICANN and was set to be its first Chief Technology Officer prior to his unexpected death. ICANN formerly operated from the same Marina del Rey building where Postel formerly worked, which is home to an office of the Information Sciences Institute at the University of Southern California. However, ICANN's headquarters is now located in the nearby Playa Vista neighborhood of Los Angeles.

Per its original by-laws, primary responsibility for policy formation in ICANN was to be delegated to three supporting organizations (Address Supporting Organization, Domain Name Supporting Organization, and Protocol Supporting Organization), each of which was to develop and recommend substantive policies and procedures for the management of the addresses within their respective scope. They were also required to be financially independent from ICANN. As expected, the RIRs and IETF agreed to serve as the Address Supporting Organization and Protocol Supporting Organization respectively, and ICANN issued a call for interested parties to propose the structure and composition of the Domain Name Supporting Organization. In March 1999, the ICANN Board, based in part on the DNSO proposals received, decided instead on an alternate construction for the DNSO which delineated specific constituencies bodies within ICANN itself, thus adding primary responsibility for DNS policy development to ICANN's existing duties of oversight and coordination.

On July 26, 2006, the United States government renewed the contract with ICANN for performance of the IANA function for an additional one to five years. The context of ICANN's relationship with the U.S. government was clarified on September 29, 2006, when ICANN signed a new memorandum of understanding with the United States Department of Commerce (DOC). This document gave the DOC oversight over some of the ICANN operations.

In July 2008, the DOC reiterated an earlier statement that it has "no plans to transition management of the authoritative root zone file to ICANN". The letter also stresses the separate roles of the IANA and VeriSign.

On September 30, 2009, ICANN signed an agreement with the DOC (known as the "Affirmation of Commitments") that confirmed ICANN's commitment to a multistakeholder governance model, but did not remove it from DOC oversight and control. The Affirmation of Commitments, which aimed to create international oversight, ran into criticism.

On March 10, 2016, ICANN and the DOC signed a historic, culminating agreement to finally remove ICANN and IANA from the control and oversight of the DOC. On October 1, 2016, ICANN was freed from U.S. government oversight.

Since its creation, ICANN has been the subject of criticism and controversy. In 2000, professor Michael Froomkin of the University of Miami School of Law argued that ICANN's relationship with the U.S. Department of Commerce is illegal, in violation of either the Constitution or federal statutes. On June 10, 2024, it was announced that Kurt Erik Lindqvist, who has been CEO of the London Internet Exchange since 2019, was to become the new president and CEO of ICANN on December 5, 2024.

== Notable events ==
On March 18, 2002, publicly elected At-Large Representative for North America board member Karl Auerbach sued ICANN in the Superior Court of Los Angeles County, California, to gain access to ICANN's accounting records without restriction. Judge Dzintra Janavs ruled in Auerbach's favor on July 29, 2002.

During September and October 2003, ICANN played a crucial role in the conflict over VeriSign's "wild card" DNS service Site Finder. After an open letter from ICANN issuing an ultimatum to VeriSign, later endorsed by the Internet Architecture Board, the company voluntarily ended the service on October 4, 2003. After this action, VeriSign filed a lawsuit against ICANN on February 27, 2004, claiming that ICANN had exceeded its authority. By this lawsuit, VeriSign sought to reduce ambiguity about ICANN's authority. The antitrust component of VeriSign's claim was dismissed during August 2004. VeriSign's challenge that ICANN overstepped its contractual rights is currently outstanding. A proposed settlement already approved by ICANN's board would resolve VeriSign's challenge to ICANN in exchange for the right to increase pricing on .com domains. At the meeting of ICANN in Rome, which took place from March 2 to 6, 2004, ICANN agreed to ask approval of the U.S. Department of Commerce for the Waiting List Service of VeriSign.

On May 17, 2004, ICANN published a proposed budget for the year 2004–05. It included proposals to increase the openness and professionalism of its operations, and increased its proposed spending from US$8.27 million to $15.83 million. The increase was to be funded by the introduction of new top-level domains, charges to domain registries, and a fee for some domain name registrations, renewals and transfers (initially US$0.20 for all domains within a country-code top-level domain, and US$0.25 for all others). The Council of European National Top Level Domain Registries (CENTR), which represents the RIRs of 39 countries, rejected the increase, accusing ICANN of a lack of financial prudence and criticizing what it describes as ICANN's "unrealistic political and operational targets". Despite the criticism, the registry agreement for the top-level domains jobs and travel includes a US$2 fee on every domain the licensed companies sell or renew.

After a second round of negotiations during 2004, the TLDs eu, asia, travel, jobs, mobi, and cat were introduced during 2005.

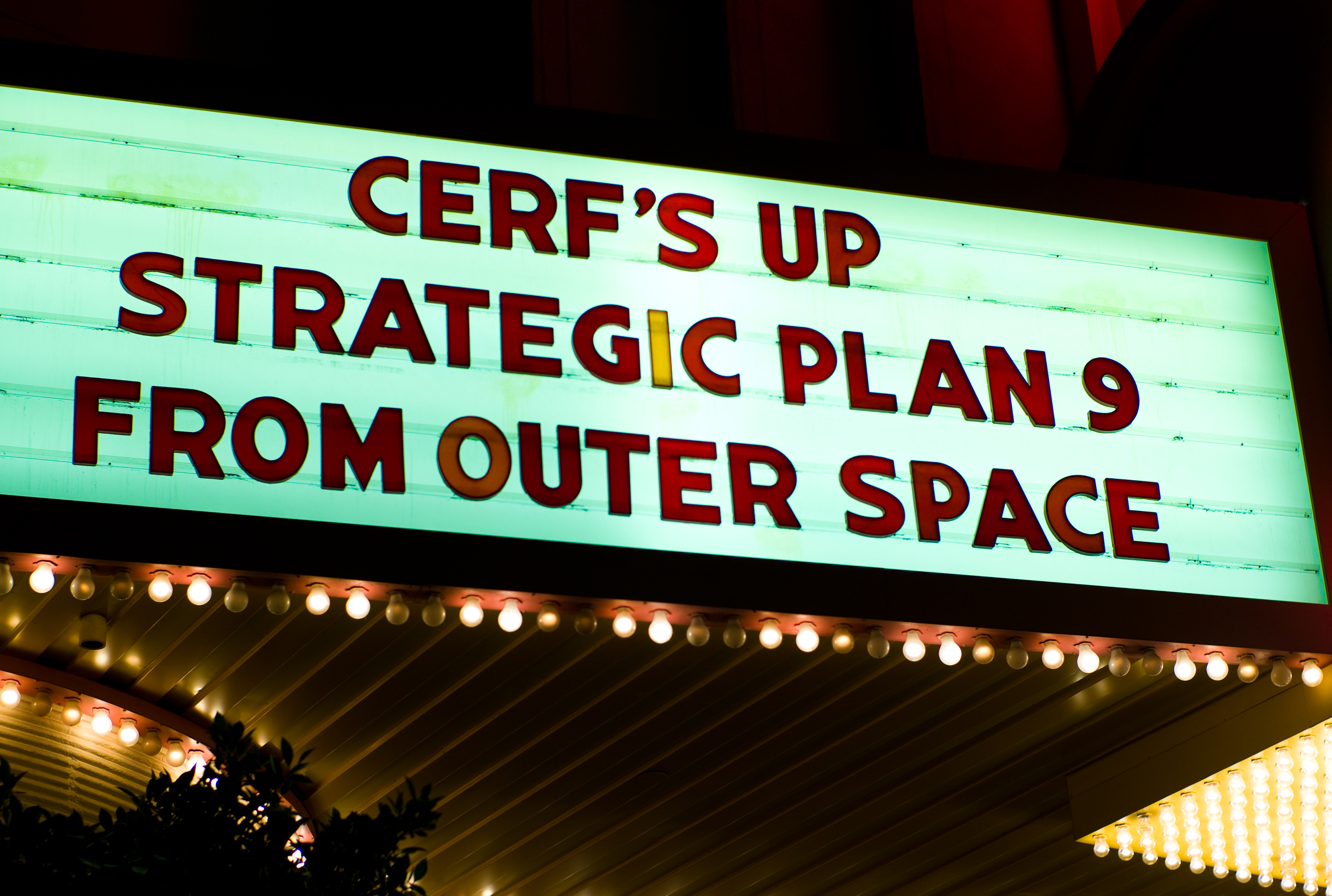
ICANN meeting, Los Angeles USA, 2007. The sign refers to Vint Cerf, then chairman of the board of directors, who is working on the so-called Interplanetary Internet.

On February 28, 2006, ICANN's board approved a settlement with VeriSign in the lawsuit resulting from SiteFinder that involved allowing VeriSign (the registry) to raise its registration fees by up to 7% a year. This was criticised by a few members of the U.S. House of Representatives' Small Business Committee.

During February 2007, ICANN began procedures to end accreditation of one of their registrars, RegisterFly amid charges and lawsuits involving fraud, and criticism of ICANN's management of the situation. ICANN has been the subject of criticism as a result of its handling of RegisterFly, and the harm caused to thousands of clients as a result of what has been termed ICANN's "laissez faire attitude toward customer allegations of fraud".

On May 23, 2008, ICANN issued enforcement notices against ten accredited registrars and announced this through a press release entitled "'Worst Spam Offenders' Notified by ICANN, Compliance system working to correct Whois and other issues." This was largely in response to a report issued by KnujOn, called "The 10 Worst Registrars" in terms of spam advertised junk product sites and compliance failure. The mention of the word "spam" in the title of the ICANN memo is somewhat misleading since ICANN does not address issues of spam or email abuse. Website content and usage are not within ICANN's mandate. However, the KnujOn report details how various registrars have not complied with their contractual obligations under the Registrar Accreditation Agreement (RAA). The main point of the KnujOn research was to demonstrate the relationships between compliance failure, illicit product traffic, and spam. The report demonstrated that out of 900 ICANN accredited registrars, fewer than 20 held 90% of the web domains advertised in spam. These same registrars were also most frequently cited by KnujOn as failing to resolve complaints made through the Whois Data Problem Reporting System (WDPRS).

On June 26, 2008, the ICANN Board started a new process of TLD naming policy to take a "significant step forward on the introduction of new generic top-level domains." This program envisioned the availability of many new or already proposed domains, as well a new application and implementation process.

On October 1, 2008, ICANN issued breach notices against Joker and Beijing Innovative Linkage Technology Ltd. after further researching reports and complaints issued by KnujOn. These notices gave the registrars 15 days to fix their Whois investigation efforts.

In 2010, ICANN approved a major review of its policies with respect to accountability, transparency, and public participation by the Berkman Center for Internet and Society at Harvard University. This external review was an assistance of the work of ICANN's Accountability and Transparency Review team.

On February 3, 2011, ICANN announced that it had distributed the last batch of its remaining IPv4 addresses to the world's five RIRs (the organizations that manage IP addresses in different regions); these registries began assigning the final IPv4 addresses within their regions until they completely ran out.

On June 20, 2011, the ICANN board voted to end most restrictions on the names of generic top-level domains (gTLD). Companies and organizations became able to choose essentially arbitrary top-level Internet domain names. The use of non-Latin characters (such as Cyrillic, Arabic, Chinese, etc.) is also allowed in gTLDs. ICANN began accepting applications for new gTLDS on January 12, 2012. The initial price to apply for a new gTLD was set at $185,000 and the annual renewal fee is $25,000.

During December 2011, the Federal Trade Commission stated ICANN had long failed to provide safeguards that protect consumers from online swindlers.

Following the 2013 NSA spying scandal, ICANN endorsed the Montevideo Statement, although no direct connection between these could be proven.

On October 1, 2016, ICANN ended its contract with the United States Department of Commerce National Telecommunications and Information Administration (NTIA) and entered the private sector.

The European Union's General Data Protection Regulation (active since May 25, 2018) has had an impact on ICANN's operations, which had to be fixed via some last minute changes.

== Structure ==
From its founding to the present, ICANN has been formally organized as a nonprofit corporation "for charitable and public purposes" under the California Nonprofit Public Benefit Corporation Law. It is managed by a 16-member board of directors composed of eight members selected by a nominating committee on which all the constituencies of ICANN are represented; six representatives of its Supporting Organizations, sub-groups that deal with specific sections of the policies under ICANN's purview; an at-large seat filled by an at-large organization; and the president / CEO, appointed by the board.

There are currently three supporting organizations: the Generic Names Supporting Organization (GNSO) which deals with policy making on generic top-level domains (gTLDs); the Country Code Names Supporting Organization (ccNSO) deals with policy making on country-code top-level domains (ccTLDs); the Address Supporting Organization (ASO) deals with policy making on IP addresses.

ICANN also relies on some advisory committees and other advisory mechanisms to receive advice on the interests and needs of stakeholders that do not directly participate in the Supporting Organizations. These include the Governmental Advisory Committee (GAC), which is composed of representatives of a large number of national governments from all over the world; the At-Large Advisory Committee (ALAC), which is composed of individual Internet users from around the world selected by each of the Regional At-Large Organizations (RALO) and Nominating Committee; the Root Server System Advisory Committee (RSSAC), which provides advice on the operation of the DNS root server system; the Security and Stability Advisory Committee (SSAC), which is composed of Internet experts who study security issues pertaining to ICANN's mandate; and the Technical Liaison Group (TLG), which is composed of representatives of other international technical organizations that focus, at least in part, on the Internet.

=== Governmental Advisory Committee ===
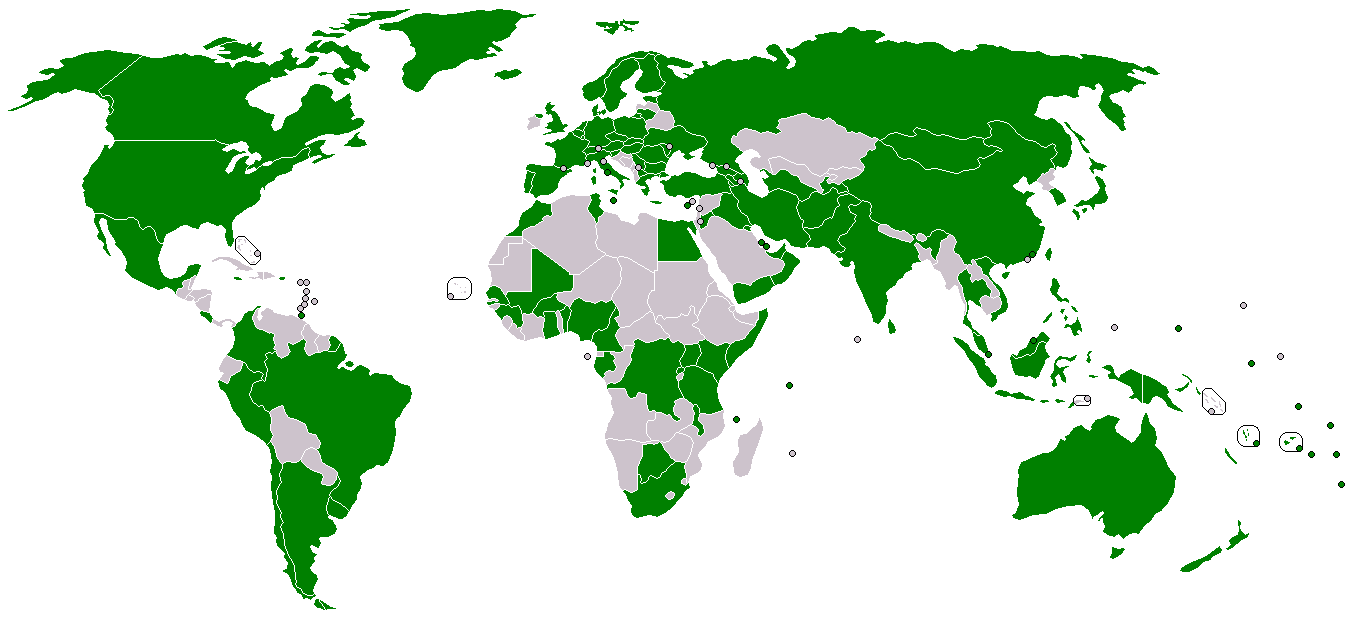
Governmental Advisory Committee representatives

==== Representatives ====
The Governmental Advisory Committee has representatives from 179 states and 38 Observer organizations, including the Holy See, Cook Islands, Niue, Taiwan, Hong Kong, Bermuda, Montserrat, the European Commission and the African Union Commission.

==== Observers ====
In addition the following organizations are GAC Observers:

- African Telecommunications Union
- Asia-Pacific Telecommunity
- Caribbean Telecommunications Union (CTU)
- Commonwealth Telecommunications Organisation (CTO)
- Council of Europe
- Economic Commission for Africa (ECA)
- European Broadcasting Union
- European Organization for Nuclear Research (CERN)
- European Space Agency
- International Labour Office
- International Telecommunication Union (ITU)
- International Criminal Police Organization (INTERPOL)
- International Red Cross and Red Crescent Movement
- Latin American Association of Telecom Regulatory Agencies (REGULATEL)
- League of Arab States
- New Partnership for Africa's Development (NEPAD)
- Organisation for Economic Co-operation and Development
- The Organization for Islamic Cooperation
- Organization of American States
- Organisation internationale de la Francophonie (OIF)
- Pacific Islands Forum
- Secretariat of the Pacific Community (SPC)
- Inter-American Telecommunication Commission (CITEL)
- International Criminal Court
- United Nations Educational Scientific and Cultural Organization (UNESCO)
- Universal Postal Union
- World Bank
- World Health Organization (WHO)
- World Intellectual Property Organization (WIPO)
- World Meteorological Organization
- World Trade Organization

=== Trusted Community Representatives ===
As the operator of the IANA domain name functions, ICANN is responsible for the DNSSEC management of the root zone. While day-to-day operations are managed by ICANN and Verisign, the trust is rooted in a group of Trusted Community Representatives. The members of this group must not be affiliated with ICANN, but are instead members of the broader DNS community, volunteering to become a Trusted Community Representative. The role of the representatives are primarily to take part in regular key ceremonies at a physical location, organized by ICANN, and to safeguard the key materials in between.

=== Democratic input ===
In the memorandum of understanding that set up the relationship between ICANN and the U.S. government, ICANN was given a mandate requiring that it operate "in a bottom-up, consensus-driven, democratic manner." However, the attempts that ICANN has made to establish an organizational structure that would allow wide input from the global Internet community did not produce results amenable to the current Board. As a result, the At-Large constituency and direct election of board members by the global Internet community were soon abandoned.

ICANN holds periodic public meetings rotated between continents for the purpose of encouraging global participation in its processes. Resolutions of the ICANN Board, preliminary reports, and minutes of the meetings are published on the ICANN website, sometimes in real-time. However, there are criticisms from ICANN constituencies including the Noncommercial Users Constituency (NCUC) and the At-Large Advisory Committee (ALAC) that there is not enough public disclosure and that too many discussions and decisions take place out of sight of the public.

During the early 2000s, there had been speculation that the United Nations might assume control of ICANN, followed by a negative reaction from the U.S. government and worries about a division of the Internet. At UN's World Summit on the Information Society in Tunisia in November 2005, the world's governments agreed not to get involved in the day-to-day and technical operations of ICANN. However they also agreed to establish an international Internet Governance Forum, with a consultative role on the future governance of the Internet. ICANN's Government Advisory Committee is currently established to provide advice to ICANN regarding public policy issues and has participation by many of the world's governments.

Some have attempted to argue that ICANN was never given the authority to decide policy, e.g., choose new TLDs or exclude other interested parties who refuse to pay ICANN's US$185,000 fee but was to be a technical caretaker. Critics suggest that ICANN should not be allowed to impose business rules on market participants and that all TLDs should be added on a first-come, first-served basis and the market should be the arbiter of who succeeds and who does not.

== Activities ==
=== Uniform Domain-Name Dispute Resolution Policy (UDRP) ===
One task that ICANN was asked to do was to address the issue of domain name ownership resolution for generic top-level domains (gTLDs). ICANN's attempt at such a policy was drafted in close cooperation with the World Intellectual Property Organization (WIPO), and the result has now become known as the Uniform Dispute Resolution Policy (UDRP). This policy essentially attempts to provide a mechanism for rapid, cheap and reasonable resolution of domain name conflicts, avoiding the traditional court system for disputes by allowing cases to be brought to one of a set of bodies that arbitrate domain name disputes. According to ICANN policy, domain registrants must agree to be bound by the UDRP—they cannot get a domain name without agreeing to this.

Examination of the UDRP decision patterns has caused some to conclude that compulsory domain name arbitration is less likely to give a fair hearing to domain name owners asserting defenses under the First Amendment and other laws, compared to the federal courts of appeal in particular.

=== Proposed elimination of public DNS whois ===
In 2013, the initial report of ICANN's Expert Working Group has recommended that the present form of Whois, a utility that allows anyone to know who has registered a domain name on the Internet, should be "abandoned". It recommends it be replaced with a system that keeps most registration information secret (or "gated") from most Internet users, and only discloses information for "permissible purposes". ICANN's list of permissible purposes includes domain name research, domain name sale and purchase, regulatory enforcement, personal data protection, legal actions, and abuse mitigation. Whois has been a key tool of investigative journalists interested in determining who was disseminating information on the Internet. The use of whois by journalists is not included in the list of permissible purposes in the initial report.

== Proposals for reform ==
Proposals have been made to internationalize ICANN's monitoring responsibilities (currently the responsibility of the US), to transform it into an international organization (under international law), and to "establish an intergovernmental mechanism enabling governments, on an equal footing, to carry out their roles and responsibilities in international public policy issues pertaining to the Internet".

=== IBSA proposal (2011) ===
One controversial proposal, resulting from a September 2011 summit between India, Brazil, and South Africa (IBSA), sought to move Internet governance into a "UN Committee on Internet-Related Policy" (UN-CIRP). The action was a reaction to a perception that the principles of the 2005 Tunis Agenda for the Information Society had not been met; the statement proposed the creation of a new political organization operating as a component of the United Nations to provide policy recommendations for the consideration of technical organizations such as ICANN and international bodies such as the ITU. Subsequent to public criticism, India backed away from the proposal.

=== Montevideo Statement on the Future of Internet Cooperation (2013) ===
On October 7, 2013, the Montevideo Statement on the Future of Internet Cooperation was released by the managers of a number of organizations involved in coordinating the Internet's global technical infrastructure, loosely known as the "I*" (or "I-star") group. Among other things, the statement "expressed strong concern over the undermining of the trust and confidence of Internet users globally due to recent revelations of pervasive monitoring and surveillance" and "called for accelerating the globalization of ICANN and IANA functions, towards an environment in which all stakeholders, including all governments, participate on an equal footing". This desire to reduce United States association with the internet is considered a reaction to the ongoing NSA surveillance scandal. The statement was signed by the managers of the ICANN, the Internet Engineering Task Force, the Internet Architecture Board, the World Wide Web Consortium, the Internet Society, and the five regional Internet address registries (African Network Information Center, American Registry for Internet Numbers, Asia-Pacific Network Information Centre, Latin America and Caribbean Internet Addresses Registry, and Réseaux IP Européens Network Coordination Centre).

=== Global Multistakeholder Meeting on the Future of Internet Governance (2013) ===
During October 2013, Fadi Chehadé, former president and CEO of ICANN, met with Brazilian president Dilma Rousseff in Brasilia. Upon Chehadé's invitation, the two announced that Brazil would host an international summit on Internet governance during April 2014. The announcement came after the 2013 disclosures of mass surveillance by the U.S. government, and Rousseff's speech at the opening session of the 2013 United Nations General Assembly, where she strongly criticized the American surveillance program as a "breach of international law". The "Global Multistakeholder Meeting on the Future of Internet Governance (NET mundial)" will include representatives of government, industry, civil society, and academia. At the IGF VIII meeting in Bali in October 2013 a commenter noted that Brazil intends the meeting to be a "summit" in the sense that it will be high level with decision-making authority. The organizers of the "NET mundial" meeting decided that an online forum called "/1net", set up by the I* group, will be a major conduit of non-governmental input into the three committees preparing for the meeting in April.

The Obama administration, which had joined critics of ICANN in 2011, announced in March 2014 that they intended to transition away from oversight of the IANA functions contract. The current contract that the United States Department of Commerce has with ICANN expired in 2015, in its place the NTIA will transition oversight of the IANA functions to the 'global multistakeholder community'.

=== NetMundial Initiative (2014) ===
The NetMundial Initiative is a plan for international governance of the Internet that was first proposed at the Global Multistakeholder Meeting on the Future of Internet Governance (GMMFIG) conference (April 23–24, 2014) and later developed into the NetMundial Initiative by ICANN CEO Fadi Chehadé along with representatives of the World Economic Forum (WEF) and the Brazilian Internet Steering Committee (Comitê Gestor da Internet no Brasil), commonly referred to as "CGI.br".

The meeting produced a nonbinding statement in favor of consensus-based decision-making. It represented a compromise and did not harshly condemn mass surveillance or support net neutrality, despite initial endorsement for the latter from Brazil; the final resolution states that ICANN should be controlled internationally by September 2015. A minority of governments, including Russia, China, Iran, and India, were unhappy with the final resolution and wanted multilateral management for the Internet (such as a UN-based model), rather than broader multistakeholder management.

A month later, the Panel on Global Internet Cooperation and Governance Mechanisms (convened by the ICANN and WEF with assistance from The Annenberg Foundation), endorsed and included the NetMundial statement in its own report.

During June 2014, France vehemently lambasted ICANN, saying they are an unfit venue for Internet governance, and that alternatives should be sought.

== TLD expansion and concerns about specific top-level domains ==
During 2011, seventy-nine companies, including The Coca-Cola Company, Hewlett-Packard, Samsung and others, signed a petition against ICANN's new TLD program (sometimes referred to as a "commercial landgrab"), in a group organized by the Association of National Advertisers. As of September 2014, this group, the Coalition for Responsible Internet Domain Oversight, that opposes the rollout of ICANN's TLD expansion program, has been joined by 102 associations and 79 major companies. Partly as a response to this criticism, ICANN initiated an effort to protect trademarks in domain name registrations, which eventually culminated in the establishment of the Trademark Clearinghouse.

=== .sucks domain ===
ICANN has received more than $60 million from gTLD auctions, and has accepted the controversial domain name ".sucks" (referring to the primarily US slang for being inferior or objectionable). sucks domains are owned and controlled by the Vox Populi Registry which won the rights for .sucks gTLD in November 2014.

The .sucks domain registrar has been described as "predatory, exploitive and coercive" by the Intellectual Property Constituency that advises the ICANN board. When the .sucks registry announced their pricing model, "most brand owners were upset and felt like they were being penalized by having to pay more to protect their brands." Because of the low utility of the ".sucks" domain, most fees come from "Brand Protection" customers registering their trademarks to prevent domains being registered.

Canadian brands had complained that they were being charged "exorbitant" prices to register their trademarks as premium names. FTC chair Edith Ramirez has written to ICANN to say the agency will take action against the .sucks owner if "we have reason to believe an entity has engaged in deceptive or unfair practices in violation of Section 5 of the FTC Act". The Register reported that intellectual property lawyers are infuriated that "the dot-sucks registry was charging trademark holders $2,500 for .sucks domains and everyone else $10."

U.S. Representative Bob Goodlatte has said that trademark holders are "being shaken down" by the registry's fees. Jay Rockefeller says that .sucks is "a predatory shakedown scheme" and "Approving '.sucks', a gTLD with little or no public interest value, will have the effect of undermining the credibility ICANN has slowly been building with skeptical stakeholders."

=== .islam, .halal top level domains ===
In a long-running dispute, ICANN has so far declined to allow a Turkish company to purchase the .islam and .halal gTLDs, after the Organisation of Islamic Cooperation objected that the gTLDs should be administered by an organization that represents all the world's 1.6 billion Muslims. After a number of attempts to resolve the issue the domains are still held "on hold" as of 2019.

=== .org price cap removal ===
In April 2019, ICANN proposed an end to the price cap of .org domains and effectively removed it in July in spite of having received 3,252 opposing comments and only six in favor. A few months later, the owner of the domain, the Public Interest Registry, proposed to sell the domain to investment firm Ethos Capital.

=== .amazon gTLD dispute ===
In May 2019, ICANN decided in favor of granting exclusive administration rights to amazon.com for the .amazon gTLD after a 7 year long dispute with the Amazon Cooperation Treaty Organization (ACTO).

== See also ==
- Alternative DNS root
- Domain name scams
- Domain Name System
  - Domain name
  - Domain name registrar
  - Internationalized domain name
  - Top-level domain
    - Country code top-level domain
    - Generic top-level domain
    - Geographic top-level domain (GeoTLD)
- IEEE Registration Authority
- Internet Assigned Numbers Authority (IANA)
- InterNIC
- List of ICANN meetings
- List of United States quangos
- Montevideo Statement on the Future of Internet Cooperation
- NetMundial Initiative, a plan for governance of the Internet
- Network Solutions
- OneWebDay
- OpenNIC
- Trademark Clearinghouse
- Uniform Domain-Name Dispute-Resolution Policy
- WHOIS
