= Special-use domain name =

Set of reserved Internet domain names

A special-use domain name is a domain name that is defined and reserved in the hierarchy of the Domain Name System of the Internet for special purposes. The designation of a reserved special-use domain is authorized by the Internet Engineering Task Force (IETF) and executed, maintained, and published by the Internet Assigned Numbers Authority (IANA).

== Reserved domain names ==
The following list comprises the domain names list by IANA in the category of special-use domain names.

| Domain | Purpose | Authority document |
|---|---|---|
| .alt | Preventing name collisions with DNS | RFC 9476 |
| 6tisch.arpa | IETF 6TiSCH working group | RFC 9031 |
| 10.in-addr.arpa | Reverse zones for IPv4 private networks (see AS112) | RFC 6761 |
| 16.172.in-addr.arpa | Reverse zones for IPv4 private networks (see AS112) | RFC 6761 |
| 17.172.in-addr.arpa | Reverse zones for IPv4 private networks (see AS112) | RFC 6761 |
| 18.172.in-addr.arpa | Reverse zones for IPv4 private networks (see AS112) | RFC 6761 |
| 19.172.in-addr.arpa | Reverse zones for IPv4 private networks (see AS112) | RFC 6761 |
| 20.172.in-addr.arpa | Reverse zones for IPv4 private networks (see AS112) | RFC 6761 |
| 21.172.in-addr.arpa | Reverse zones for IPv4 private networks (see AS112) | RFC 6761 |
| 22.172.in-addr.arpa | Reverse zones for IPv4 private networks (see AS112) | RFC 6761 |
| 23.172.in-addr.arpa | Reverse zones for IPv4 private networks (see AS112) | RFC 6761 |
| 24.172.in-addr.arpa | Reverse zones for IPv4 private networks (see AS112) | RFC 6761 |
| 25.172.in-addr.arpa | Reverse zones for IPv4 private networks (see AS112) | RFC 6761 |
| 26.172.in-addr.arpa | Reverse zones for IPv4 private networks (see AS112) | RFC 6761 |
| 27.172.in-addr.arpa | Reverse zones for IPv4 private networks (see AS112) | RFC 6761 |
| 28.172.in-addr.arpa | Reverse zones for IPv4 private networks (see AS112) | RFC 6761 |
| 29.172.in-addr.arpa | Reverse zones for IPv4 private networks (see AS112) | RFC 6761 |
| 30.172.in-addr.arpa | Reverse zones for IPv4 private networks (see AS112) | RFC 6761 |
| 31.172.in-addr.arpa | Reverse zones for IPv4 private networks (see AS112) | RFC 6761 |
| 168.192.in-addr.arpa | Reverse zones for IPv4 private networks (see AS112) | RFC 6761 |
| 170.0.0.192.in-addr.arpa | NAT64 prefix discovery | RFC 8880 |
| 171.0.0.192.in-addr.arpa | NAT64 prefix discovery | RFC 8880 |
| ipv4only.arpa | NAT64 prefix discovery | RFC 8880 |
| 254.169.in-addr.arpa | Reverse zone for the IPv4 link-local address space | RFC 6762 |
| 8.e.f.ip6.arpa | Reverse zones for the IPv6 link-local address space | RFC 6762 |
| 9.e.f.ip6.arpa | Reverse zones for the IPv6 link-local address space | RFC 6762 |
| a.e.f.ip6.arpa | Reverse zones for the IPv6 link-local address space | RFC 6762 |
| b.e.f.ip6.arpa | Reverse zones for the IPv6 link-local address space | RFC 6762 |
| .eap.arpa | Extensible Authentication Protocol | RFC 9965 |
| .eap-noob.arpa | Extensible Authentication Protocol | RFC 9965 |
| .home.arpa | Non-unique use in residential networks | RFC 8375 |
| .resolver.arpa | Facilitate upgrading to encrypted DNS | RFC 9462 |
| .service.arpa | DNS-based service discovery | RFC 9665 |
| .example | Documentation, tutorials, or testing | RFC 6761 |
| example.com | Documentation, tutorials, or testing | RFC 6761 |
| example.net | Documentation, tutorials, or testing | RFC 6761 |
| example.org | Documentation, tutorials, or testing | RFC 6761 |
| .invalid | Documentation, tutorials, or testing | RFC 6761 |
| .test | Documentation, tutorials, or testing | RFC 6761 |
| .local | Used in multicast DNS (mDNS) | RFC 6762 |
| .localhost | Refers to the loopback addresses (:: and 127.0.0.1) | RFC 6761 |
| .onion | Tor network onion services | RFC 7686 |

== See also ==
- .internal, reserved by ICANN
- Reserved top-level domains
