= .internal =

Private Internet domain for application use

internal
- Introduced: 29 July 2024; 2 years ago
- TLD type: Reserved top-level domain
- Status: Reserved
- Intended use: Private use

The name internal is reserved by ICANN as a domain name for private application use that may not be installed as a top-level domain in the Domain Name System (DNS) of the Internet. The domain has yet to be standardized by the Internet Engineering Task Force (IETF), though an Internet-Draft describing the TLD has been submitted.

== History ==
In 2013, RFC 6762 mentioned the use of unregistered TLDs for private internal networks, and while recommending against them, included .internal among other unregistered TLDs that had been in common use on private networks. Later, in 2017, an Internet-Draft draft-wkumari-dnsop-internal-00 proposed reserving the use of .internal for "names which do not have meaning in the global context but do have meaning in a context internal to their network", and for which the RFC 6761 reserved names are semantically inappropriate. The draft expired on January 3, 2018.

On January 24, 2024, ICANN opened submissions for public comment on a proposed top-level domain reserved for "private-use and internal network applications". Amazon and Google both submitted comments in favor of the TLD. ICANN stated that the adoption of a domain explicitly reserved for internal network usage would help minimize usage of uncoordinated and ad hoc TLDs, such as .corp, .home, .lan, and .private.

On July 29, 2024, ICANN formally accepted and reserved .internal for private-use applications. An Internet-Draft, draft-davies-internal-tld-00, was made on August 2 describing the reservation of .internal. It identified the risk of choosing unassigned TLDs that could be "later introduced into the global DNS, resulting in name collisions and unpredictable behavior."

== See also ==
- .example
- .local
- .localhost
- .test
- .home.arpa, a special-use domain name for non-unique use on residential networks
