= Internet in Zimbabwe =

The Internet in Zimbabwe has seen rapid expansion in recent years. The Internet country code top-level domain is .zw. In 2009, the Mugabe-Tsvangirai Government of National Unity established a Ministry of Information and Communications Technology to focus on ICT growth and development.

== History of the Internet in Zimbabwe ==
Zimbabwe's first internet service provider (ISP), Data Control & Systems, was established in 1994. In 1997, the national Posts and Telecommunication Corporation (PTC) built a national Internet backbone to sell bandwidth to private ISPs. The Postal and Telecommunications Regulatory Authority of Zimbabwe (POTRAZ) oversees ISP licensing. As of 2009, licenses cost US$2–4 million, depending on the level of service the ISP wished to provide, plus 3.5 percent of the ISP's annual gross income. The most recent membership list on the Zimbabwe Internet Service Providers Association (ZISPA) web site, last updated in 2007, comprises 28 ISPs.

== Statistics ==
Approximately 40 percent (5.2 million) of Zimbabwe's population were internet users as of January 2014. This contrasts with 15.7 percent in 2011 and 0.4 percent in the year 2000. Most of the users (5.16 million) access internet via mobile devices.

== Operators ==
Liquid Telcom, a subsidiary of Econet Wireless, is the leading internet player in Zimbabwe. Their local fibre network is the largest in the country and since early 2013 they also operate the largest fibre network in Africa. Liquid's pan-African fibre network stretches across nine countries (South Africa, Zimbabwe, Kenya, Lesotho, Botswana, Zambia, DRC, Rwanda, and Uganda).

As of 2011, Zimbabwe's largest ISPs were YoAfrica and Zimbabwe Online (ZOL). Government-owned communications company TelOne is another major ISP; it provides bandwidth to most other ISPs in the country. In 2006, TelOne's international satellite services were cut due to non-payment of debts, severely impacting service in the country. The debts were eventually cleared by the Reserve Bank. In 2009 it raised its fees tenfold before being ordered to reduce them by the Minister of Information and Communication Technology. Plans were then announced to privatise the company. GISP, an ISP operating since 1998, provides internet services to the government and to parastatal organizations.

== Legal and regulatory framework ==
The Post and Telecommunications Act of 2000 allows the government to monitor e-mail usage and requires ISPs to supply information to government officials when requested. The Supreme Court, however, ruled in 2004 that the sections of the law that permit monitoring violated the constitution. The government struck back with an initiative that requires ISPs to renew contracts with TelOne with the stipulation that they report any e-mail with “offensive or dangerous” content. In essence, this requires ISPs to do what the Supreme Court has ruled unconstitutional. The Zimbabwe Internet Service Providers Association has stated that none of its members will sign agreements with TelOne.

The government strengthened its Internet surveillance policies with the Interception of Communications Bill of 2006. Under its provisions, the government will establish a telecommunications agency called the Monitoring and Interception of Communications Center to oversee, among other things, all telecommunications and postal services. Telecommunications and Internet service providers are required to ensure that their systems are technically capable of monitoring and to cover all associated costs. The government initially withdrew the bill in November 2006 over constitutionality objections from the Parliamentary Legal Committee, but the parliament approved it in June 2007.

In June 2009, the government began discussing a new Information Communication and Technology Bill, which will take the place of the Broadcasting Services Act and the Posts and Telecommunications Act. It will also amend some sections of the Access to Information and Protection of Privacy Act, which, among other things, governs the accreditation of journalists. If passed, the bill will consolidate ICT regulation under the proposed National Information and Communications Technology Authority of Zimbabwe, which will oversee ICT, broadcasting and postal services. The Authority will technically be an independent organization, though it will also be responsible for enacting government policies, a duty that may compromise its independence.

== Surveillance and censorship ==
The Posts and Telecommunications Act introduced by Zimbabwe on 8 March 2000 empowers the government to intercept private e-mail traffic at its discretion. Sending or receiving disparaging comments about the country and its leadership rendered Zimbabwean nationals liable for a Z$200,000 fine. A spokesman for Zimbabwe Lawyers for Human Rights claimed that the legislation was "designed to remind internet service providers and others that they operated only at the mercy of the president."

According to Reporters Without Borders, during the 2008 presidential elections, government forces hacked into journalists’ e-mail accounts; eight journalists were fired for allegedly failing to support Mugabe and the ZANU-PF. Employees of the Reserve Bank are not allowed to receive e-mails containing the words “Morgan Tsvangirai” or “MDC”; the bank has had an e-mail content manager installed since 2006 that prevents e-mails with political content from reaching their intended recipients. In 2005, authorities arrested 40 people in a raid on a local Internet café because an e-mail insulting Mugabe was sent from the location.

The OpenNet Initiative conducted testing on Zimbabwean ISP CABSAS in September 2008 and found no evidence of filtering.

In 2017 it was announced that a new Board Of Censors headed by Home Affairs Minister Ignatius Chombo will be commissioned to tackle the spread of information in the digital age.

== See also ==
- .zw
