= Hakon Haugnes =

Businessman

Hakon Haugnes is one of the founders of the .name top-level domain founded and launched by Global Name Registry (GNR) in 2000/2001. Previously Mr Haugnes was a co-founder of Nameplanet.com, which provided personalized email addresses to 1 million users in March 2000.

Hakon Haugnes is CFO/COO of Andurand Capital and responsible for all operational and financial (non-investment) aspects of the company. Hakon was previously Risk Manager for BlueGold Capital (2010-2012), reporting to the CFO and CIO on all risk management aspects of the hedge fund which at its peak managed over US$2 billion. Mr Haugnes also developed BlueGold's information systems and headed up the in-house development team. Hakon was Business Analyst for BlueGold from 2009 to 2010. Prior to BlueGold, Haugnes was co-founder and president of Global Name Registry, a private company which was sold in Q4 2008 to VeriSign Inc (NASDAQ:VRSN).

He served with the Norwegian Armed Forces as Strategist and holds a master's degree (honours) in mathematical modelling from the Institute of Cybernetics at the Norwegian Institute of Science and Technology (NTNU) and studied engineering at Institut National des Sciences Appliquees (INSA) in Toulouse, France.
