= Address munging =

Privacy technique to cloak e-mail addresses

Address munging is the practice of disguising an e-mail address to prevent it from being automatically collected by unsolicited bulk e-mail providers. Address munging is intended to disguise an e-mail address in a way that prevents computer software from seeing the real address, or even any address at all, but still allows a human reader to reconstruct the original and contact the author: an email address such as, "no-one@example.com", becomes "no-one at example dot com", for instance.

Any e-mail address posted in public is likely to be automatically collected by computer software used by bulk emailers (a process known as e-mail address scavenging). Addresses posted on webpages, Usenet or chat rooms are particularly vulnerable to this. Private e-mail sent between individuals is highly unlikely to be collected, but e-mail sent to a mailing list that is archived and made available via the web, or passed on to a Usenet news server and made public, may eventually be scanned and collected.

== Disadvantages ==
Disguising addresses makes it more difficult for people to send e-mail to each other. Many see it as an attempt to fix a symptom rather than solving the real problem of e-mail spam, at the expense of causing problems for innocent users. In addition, there are e-mail address harvesters who have found ways to read the munged email addresses.

The use of address munging on Usenet is contrary to the recommendations of RFC 1036 governing the format of Usenet posts, which requires a valid e-mail address be supplied in the From: field of the post. In practice, few people follow this recommendation strictly.

Disguising e-mail addresses in a systematic manner (for example, user[at]domain[dot]com) offers little protection.

Any impediment reduces the user's willingness to take the extra trouble to email the user. In contrast, well-maintained e-mail filtering on the user's end does not drive away potential correspondents. No spam filter is 100% immune to false positives, however, and the same potential correspondent that would have been deterred by address munging may instead end up wasting time on long letters that will merely disappear into junk mail folders.

For commercial entities, maintaining contact forms on web pages rather than publicizing e-mail addresses may be one way to ensure that incoming messages are relatively spam-free yet do not get lost. In conjunction with CAPTCHA fields, spam on such comment fields can be reduced to effectively zero, except that non-accessibility of CAPTCHAs bring the same deterrent problems as address munging itself.

== Alternatives ==
As an alternative to address munging, there are several "transparent" techniques that allow people to post a valid e-mail address, but still make it difficult for automated recognition and collection of the address:

- Content delivery network vendors, such as Cloudflare, offer email address obfuscation services to their clients.
- "Transparent name mangling" involves replacing characters in the address with equivalent HTML references from the list of XML and HTML character entity references, e.g. the '@' gets replaced by either 'U+0040' or '&#64;' and the '.' gets replaced by either 'U+002E' or '&#46;' with the user knowing to take out the dashes.
- Posting all or part of the e-mail address as an image, for example, no-oneexample.com, where the at sign is disguised as an image, sometimes with the alternative text specified as "@" to allow copy-and-paste, but while altering the address to remain outside of typical regular expressions of spambots.
- Using a client-side form with the e-mail address as a CSS3 animated text logo captcha and shrinking it to normal size using inline CSS.
- Posting an e-mail address with the order of characters jumbled and restoring the order using CSS.
- Building the link by client-side scripting.
- Using client-side scripting to produce a multi key email address encrypter.
- Using server-side scripting to run a contact form.
- Using Base64 to encode the email address.

An example of munging "user@example.com" via client-side scripting would be:

 <script type="text/javascript">
 var name = 'user';
 var at = '@';
 var domain = 'example.com';
 document.write(name + at + domain);
 </script>

The use of images and scripts for address obfuscation can cause problems for people using screen readers and users with disabilities, and ignores users of text browsers like lynx and w3m, although being transparent means they don't disadvantage non-English speakers that cannot understand the plain text bound to a single language that is part of non-transparent munged addresses or instructions that accompany them.

According to a 2003 study by the Center for Democracy and Technology, even the simplest "transparent name mangling" of e-mail addresses can be effective. However, modern address harvesting bots have become significantly more sophisticated and can often parse these techniques, including the execution of client-side JavaScript to reveal an address.

== Examples ==
Common methods of disguising addresses include:

Disguised address	Recovering the original address	Notes
no-one at example (dot) com	Replace " at " with "@", and " (dot) " with "."	
no-one@elpmaxe.com.invalid	Reverse domain name: elpmaxe to example; remove .invalid	
moc.elpmaxe@eno-on	Reverse the entire address	
no-one@exampleREMOVEME.com	Instructions in the address itself; remove REMOVEME	
no-one@exampleNOSPAM.com.invalid	Remove NOSPAM and .invalid from the address.	
n o - o n e @ e x a m p l e . c o m	Remove the spaces between each letter of the address	This is still readable, but the spaces between letters stop most automatic spambots.
no-one<i>@</i>example<i>.</i>com (as HTML)	Can be directly copied from webpages	This is still readable and can be copied directly from webpages, but stops many email harvesters.
по-опе@ехатрlе.сот	Manually replace each character in the address with its closest lookalike	Cannot be copied directly from webpages — all letters except l are Cyrillic homoglyphs that are identical to Latin equivalents to the human eye but are perceived differently by most computers. (See also IDN homograph attack for more malicious use of this strategy.)
no-oneexample.com	Replace the image with "@".	

The reserved top-level domain .invalid is appended to ensure that a real e-mail address is not inadvertently generated.

== See also ==
- Internet bot
- Netiquette
