= Host (Unix) =

Unix program for DNS lookups

host
- Developer: Internet Systems Consortium (ISC)
- Operating system: Unix, Unix-like
- Type: Command
- License: Mozilla Public License 2.0

host is a simple utility for performing Domain Name System lookups.

== Origin ==
It was developed by the Internet Systems Consortium (ISC), and is released under the Mozilla Public License 2.0.

== Modes ==
When applied to a fully qualified domain name (FQDN) the host command will return information associated with that name such as its IP address and mail handling host. It can also be used to list all members of a domain. The host command is also able to perform reverse IP lookups to find the FQDN associated with an IP address.

== Example ==
$ host example.com
example.com has address 93.184.216.34
example.com has IPv6 address 2606:2800:220:1:248:1893:25c8:1946
example.com mail is handled by 0 .

== See also ==
- BIND name server
- dig, a utility interrogates DNS servers directly for troubleshooting and system administration purposes.
- nslookup, another utility that can be used to obtain similar information
- Root name server - top-level name servers providing top level domain name resolution
- List of DNS record types - possible types of records stored and queried within DNS
- whois
