= LongIsland.com =

Destination specific geodomain

- Company type: Private company
- Industry: Media; Web search engine Web portal
- Founded: 1996
- Headquarters: Commack, New York, USA
- Key people: John Colascione, CEO; Ralph Cristello, Officer on Board of Managers Tyler Roe was the original CEO of LongIsland.com, through its parent company, Invision.com, Inc.
- Revenue: Not disclosed
- Net income: Not disclosed
- Number of employees: 15
- Website: www.LongIsland.com

LongIsland.com is a destination-specific geodomain and Web portal founded in 1996 and headquartered in Commack, New York, on Long Island. It is owned by Long Island Media Inc. LongIsland.com provides extensive content, local news, Associated Press newslines, press releases and other information for both area residents and visitors. The web site receives in access of 450,000 visitors per month. Its tagline is Long Island's Most Popular Website, and although compelling and memorable, this may not necessarily be supported by fact.

== History ==
LongIsland.com was originally owned and operated by Invision.com, Inc. an IT firm that subsequently merged with IT firm mindShift in September 2007. In 2010, Massachusetts based Mindshift sold the domain during an online auction for $370,000.00. John Colascione owner of Long Island Exchange Inc. and Ralph Cristello owner of Internet Point Inc, were rival bidders, with Cristello ultimately winning the auction. In 2015 the two competitors merged into Long Island Media Inc.

== Pizza Contest ==
The Long Island Pizza Festival & Bake-Off is an annual charity event coordinated and hosted by LongIsland.com. The Festival has been featured on FoodNetwork TV's "All American Festivals," written up in The New York Times, spotlighted on local TV stations including News 12 and Long Island News Tonight.

== See also ==
- Long Island Pizza Festival & Bake-Off
- Geodomain
- Long Island
