= .mail =

Rejected top level domain

- Introduced: Not officially introduced; proposed in 2004
- TLD type: Proposed top-level domain
- Status: Cancelled
- Registry: None yet established
- Actual use: ICANN rejected due to naming conflicts
- Documents: ICANN Board Resolution on .CORP, .HOME and .MAIL

.mail was a potential generic top-level domain originally proposed by The Spamhaus Project in 2004, but rejected by ICANN. Its purpose was to enable responsible message recipients to reliably and efficiently identify and accept spam-free mailstreams. The ICANN Board issued a resolution on 4 February 2018 to cease the processing of all applications for the .corp, .home, and .mail gTLDs.

== Proposed core functionality ==
.mail was an attempt to reduce the spam problem by maintaining a list of domains authenticated as both not belonging to known spammers, and providing verified contact information. They operated on widely used DNS-based blocklists (DNSBLs) such as the Spamhaus Blocklist(SBL) and Domain Blocklist (DBL) - which identify the IP addresses and domains associated with spam, phishing, and malware, protecting over 4.5 billion mailboxes. The sTLD would contain the actual hostnames of servers used to send mail. A .mail domain would only be able to be registered by a party that already owns a domain in another TLD which has been in operation for at least six months, and whose WHOIS information has been verified for accuracy. The domain was intended to be a publicly curated resources that could be updated as needed by the Internet.

== Technical concerns ==
Investigation into the conflicts regarding gTLDs that are in use in internal networks was conducted at ICANN's request by Interisle Consulting. The resulting report was to become known as the Name Collision issue, which was first reported at ICANN 47. This decision affected the proposed .corp, .home, and .mail gTLDs.

== See also ==
- Top Level Domain
- Generic top-level domain
- .corp rejected gTLD
- .home rejected gTLD
