= Example.com =

Reserved Internet domain name

example.com
- Screenshot of example.com
- Website type: Reserved domain
- Available in: English
- Owner: Internet Assigned Numbers Authority
- Website: www.example.com
- IPv6 support: No
- Launched: 1 January 1999; 27 years ago
- Current status: Online

The domain names example.com, example.net, example.org, and example.edu are second-level domain names in the Domain Name System of the Internet. They are reserved by the Internet Assigned Numbers Authority (IANA) at the direction of the Internet Engineering Task Force (IETF) as special-use domain names for documentation purposes. The domain names are used widely in books, tutorials, sample network configurations, and generally as examples for the use of domain names. As a courtesy, the Internet Corporation for Assigned Names and Numbers (ICANN) operates websites for these domains with content that reflects their purpose.

== Purpose ==
The domains example.com, example.net, example.org and example.edu are intended for general use in any kind of documentation, such as technical and software documentation, manuals, and sample software configurations. Thus, documentation writers can be sure to select a domain name without creating naming conflicts if end-users try to use the sample configurations or examples verbatim. The domains may be used in documentation without prior consultation with IANA or ICANN.

In practice, these domain names are also installed in the Domain Name System with the Internet Protocol (IP) addresses for Internet Protocol version 4 (IPv4) and IPv6 of a web server managed by ICANN. The domains are digitally signed using Domain Name System Security Extensions (DNSSEC).

The zone files of each domain also define one subdomain name. The third-level domain name www resolves to the IP addresses of the parent domains.

== History ==
The second-level domain label example for the top-level domains com, net, and org have been reserved and registered since at least 1992. The IETF established the authority of this use in 1999.

In 2013, the status and purpose of the domains was restated by the IETF as belonging to a group of special-use domain names.

On October 9, 2025, the domains received a minor update to their appearance and content when visited over HTTP(S), adding a note about avoiding use in operations. The domains changed their name server and start of authority records to ones managed by Cloudflare.

The website received another update on September 28, 2026, with the text now cycling between the six official languages of the United Nations (English, Arabic, Simplified Chinese, French, Russian, and Spanish in that order). The note was also expanded to state that the site is not a service and should not be relied on for testing or monitoring. A further minor update was pushed on October 2, 2026, changing the animated cycling text to static text in the six languages.

== See also ==
- .example – Top-level domain name reserved for documentation purposes
- .local – Pseudo-TLD with no meaning in the DNS for use with local zeroconf networking only
- Fictitious domain name
- IPv4 Special-use addresses – some special-use IPv4 address ranges are reserved for documentation and examples
- domains
