= .name =

Internet top-level domain

- Introduced: August 17, 2001; 25 years ago
- TLD type: Generic top-level domain
- Status: Active
- Registry: Verisign
- Sponsor: None
- Intended use: Personal sites of individuals
- Actual use: Mostly used as intended
- Registration restrictions: No prior restriction on registration, but registrations can be challenged if not by or on behalf of an individual with a name similar to that of the domain, or a fictional character in which the registrant has rights
- Structure: Originally registrations had to be at third level, in form john.smith.name, but later direct second-level registrations were allowed
- Documents: ICANN registry agreement
- Dispute policies: dot name - Eligibility Requirements Dispute Resolution Policy (ERDRP) at the Wayback Machine (archived September 12, 2008)
- Registry website: verisign.com/domain-names/name-domains

.name is a generic top-level domain (gTLD) in the Domain Name System of the Internet. It is intended for use by individuals for representation of their personal name, nicknames, screen names, pseudonyms, or other types of identification labels.

== History ==
The top-level domain was founded by Hakon Haugnes and Geir Rasmussen and initially delegated to Global Name Registry in 2001, and become fully operational in January 2002. Verisign was the outsourced operator for .name since the .name launch in 2002 and acquired Global Name Registry in 2008.

In late September 2007, security researchers accused Global Name Registry of harboring hackers by charging fees per WHOIS lookup. The policy of selling detailed registration info about domains in name for US$2 each was criticized as hindering community efforts to locate and clean up malware-spreading hosts, zombies, and botnet control servers located in name. The registry offers unlimited lookups to approved users who sign a 10-page legal agreement.

In November 2009, internationalized domain names (IDNs) became available for second- and third-level domain names. IDNs are domain names that are represented by user applications in the native character set of a language.

== Structure ==
When the TLD name was first launched, only third-level registrations and forwarded e-mail addresses were available. Second-level registrations became available in January 2004. The original intended structure of domain names was first.last.name, so that individuals could get a domain corresponding to their name.

The purpose of this sharing of second-level names was to ensure that the highest number of people possible could get an email address that included their last name. This sharing did not impact any other people with the same last name, and research by Global Name Registry showed that a majority of the world's population does not have an overlapping firstname–lastname combination.

== Usage ==
Subdomains of name may be registered at the second-level (john.name) and the third-level (john.doe.name). It is also possible to register an e-mail address of the form john@doe.name. Email forwarding will be operated by Verisign. The target address can be specified by an additional EPP mapping. The second-level domain of third-level subdomains is shared, and may not be registered by individuals.

The WHOIS service for name is available at whois.nic.name. Domain name registrations are available from accredited ICANN registrars.

== Attempted termination of third level domains ==
On 28 July 2026, ICANN approved Verisign's requests to discontinue third-level domain registrations and the associated email forwarding service, with existing registrations to be unilaterally terminated by Verisign with the stated purpose to "increase efficiency".

A pre-emptive request for reconsideration by a registrant of a third level domain was rejected by both the ombudsman and the board accountability mechanisms committee, in each case on the basis that the proposal did not raise significant security, stability or competition issues. Since then, eight more requests for reconsideration, including one on behalf of 9 registrants, have been filed with ICANN by registrants that raise additional issues. Those additional requests assert security issues including that the change creates an opportunity for a new registrant to obtain the second level domain and intercept emails — including account access and password reset emails to obtain access to existing online accounts — facilitating privacy violations, financial loss or identity theft.

Some acquired third-level domains when second-level domains were not available for sale yet.

In the face of growing pressure and in advance of ICANN reconsideration, Verisign retracted its earlier request. All existing 3rd-level domains and email redirects will be preserved, though new registrations will end.

== See also ==
- Domain name
