= Nslookup =

Utility to query the Domain Name System

nslookup
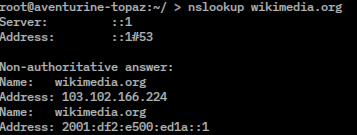
- The nslookup command
- Developers: Andrew Cherenson, Internet Systems Consortium, IBM, Microsoft, Lucas Suggs
- Operating system: Unix, Unix-like, OS/2, Microsoft Windows, ReactOS
- Platform: Cross-platform
- Type: Command
- License: BSD

nslookup (from name server lookup) is a network administration command-line tool for querying the Domain Name System (DNS) to obtain the mapping between domain name and IP address, or other DNS records.

== Overview ==
nslookup is a member of the BIND name server software. Andrew Cherenson created nslookup as a class project at UC Berkeley in 1986 and it first shipped in 4.3-Tahoe BSD. In the development of BIND 9, the Internet Systems Consortium planned to deprecate nslookup in favor of host and dig. This decision was reversed in 2004 with the release of BIND 9.3 and nslookup has been fully supported since then.

Unlike dig, nslookup does not use the operating system's local Domain Name System resolver library to perform its queries, and thus may behave differently. Additionally, vendor-provided versions may include the output of other sources of name information, such as host files, and Network Information Service. Some behaviors of nslookup may be modified by the contents of resolv.conf.

The Linux version of nslookup is the original BSD version written by Andrew Cherenson.

The ReactOS version was developed by Lucas Suggs and is licensed under the GPL.

== Usage ==
nslookup operates in interactive or non-interactive mode. When used interactively by invoking it without arguments or when the first argument is - (minus sign) and the second argument is a hostname or Internet address of a name server, the user issues parameter configurations or requests when presented with the nslookup prompt (>). When no arguments are given, then the command queries the default server. The - (minus sign) invokes subcommands which are specified on the command line and should precede nslookup commands. In non-interactive mode, i.e. when the first argument is a name or Internet address of the host being searched, parameters and the query are specified as command line arguments in the invocation of the program. The non interactive mode searches the information for a specified host using the default name server.

== See also ==
- dig, a utility that interrogates DNS servers directly for troubleshooting and system administration purposes.
- host is a simple utility for performing Domain Name System lookups.
- List of DNS record types - possible types of records stored and queried within DNS
- Root name server - top-level name servers providing top level domain name resolution
- whois
- BIND name server
