= .zw =

Internet country code top-level domain for Zimbabwe

- Introduced: 6 November 1991
- TLD type: Country code top-level domain
- Status: Active
- Registry: ZISPA
- Sponsor: Postal and Telecommunications Regulatory Authority
- Intended use: Entities connected with Zimbabwe
- Actual use: Gets some use in Zimbabwe
- Registration restrictions: None
- Structure: Registrations are at third level beneath second-level categories
- Documents: Terms and conditions Registration procedure
- Registry website: ZISPA

.zw is the internet country code top-level domain (ccTLD) for Zimbabwe.

Although no registry website is shown in the IANA whois listing, .co.zw registrations are presently being taken by the Zimbabwe Internet Service Providers Association (ZISPA), whose charter claims that one of the purposes of the organization's founding was to oversee the .zw domain. TelOne is also listed as the administrative and technical contact of the domain.

.ac.zw registrations are being taken by the University of Zimbabwe. Applications are handled by this institution's Computer Centre. As with the general norm, .ac.zw registrations are for academic institutions.

.org.zw registrations are taken by the country's fixed telecommunications provider, TelOne. These are intended for use by NGOs, and similar organisations but any restrictions are not clear.

.gov.zw and .mil.zw are used for military and government websites for Zimbabwe.

.zw domains are used by less than 0.1% of all websites worldwide.
