= Long Island Pizza Festival & Bake-Off =

Charity event in New York, United States

The Long Island Pizza Festival & Bake-Off is an annual charity event that takes place on Long Island, New York. The event is coordinated and hosted by LongIsland.com a free online news and information resource for Long Island.

Long Island pizzerias compete to be named Best Pizza on Long Island in an online voting contest. The finalists are selected to participate in the Bake-Off which takes place at the Pizza Festival held annually during National Pizza Month in October.

The Long Island Pizza Festival has been featured on FoodNetwork TV's "All American Festivals," written up in The New York Times, spotlighted on local TV stations including News 12 and Long Island News Tonight.

The event has been sanctioned by Pizza Marketing Quarterly (PMQ), a pizza industry trade publication as a preliminary competition to the American Pizza Championships.

The Long Island Pizza Festival is also recognized by the World Pizza Champions. A winner from the local Long Island competition is invited to tour with the Team in larger pizza competitions which have included the World Pizza Championships, an international pizza competition held in Salsomaggiore, Italy.

The festival was called off in 2020.

== Charity aspects ==
The Long Island Pizza Contest and Festival raises funds to help feed the hungry. A portion of the proceeds go to Long Island Cares and Island Harvest, non-profit food organizations based on Long Island, NY.
