= Global Name Registry =

Global Name Registry, Limited was the operator of the .name top-level domain for individuals' names as delegated by ICANN on August 1, 2001. It was based in London, in the United Kingdom.

According to the Wall Street Journal, Global Name Registry planned to "transform the .name addresses into a multipurpose tool that can receive e-mail or serve as a virtual credit card". The Global Name Registry launched .name on January 15, 2002.

VeriSign, Inc., acquired Global Name Registry on October 1, 2008. ICANN approved the reassignment of the .name TLD to VeriSign on January 12, 2009.
