= .corp =

Rejected top level domain

- Introduced: Not officially introduced; proposed in 2012
- TLD type: Proposed top-level domain for Commerce
- Status: Cancelled
- Registry: None yet established
- Actual use: ICANN rejected due to naming conflicts
- Documents: ICANN Board Resolution on .CORP, .HOME and .MAIL

.corp is an ICANN rejected generic top level domain proposed in 2012. The ICANN Board issued a resolution on February 4, 2018 to cease the processing of all applications for the .corp, .home, and .mail gTLDs.

== Technical concerns ==
Investigation into the conflicts regarding gTLDs that are in use in internal networks was conducted at ICANN's request by Interisle Consulting. The resulting report was to become known as the Name Collision issue, which was first reported at ICANN 47.

== See also ==
- Top Level Domain
- Generic top-level domain
- .home rejected gTLD
- .mail rejected gTLD
