= Data Control & Systems =

Data Control & Systems was a company formed by Rob Nursten in Zimbabwe (1994) and became commercially operational in 1995. The company was originally a subsidiary of UUNet Internet Africa, which he started in South Africa with the demand for internet services.

== History of Internet service in Zimbabwe ==
Data Control won an award from "Best Of The Planet Awards 1996 IN THE CATEGORY OF WWW INTERNET PROVIDERS" on 2ask.com. Data Control & Systems was the first internet service provider in Zimbabwe. They provided a technological first in Southern Africa. They were started in South Africa as a subsidiary of UUnet Internet Africa. The main directors of the company were Clint Nursten and his father, Rob Nursten. The Network Administration was handled by Clint Sim and Scott Nursten, who was also responsible for the security systems at both the host and network levels. Scott also provided web design and various programming applications for the commercial side of the company. He then went on to start s2s Ltd, a major provider of security and networking consultancy in the United Kingdom with his brother Dale Nursten.

The company set out to provide Internet access to the whole of southern Africa from 1994 onwards. Its domain name was harare.iafrica.com which used leased line access from South Africa through the Zimbabwean Posts & Telecommunications Company aka P.T.C. Eventually Data Control & Systems changed name to Internet Unlimited and was then bought out by Econet Wireless and named Ecoweb Internet. During the period of the company being named Internet Unlimited, the domain name was internet.co.zw and has remained as that domain up until 2002. As of 2005, the company provided internet access to over 50,000 Zimbabweans and many international tourists through lower level internet cafes and client computers.

== Technical management and support ==
=== Server hardware and software ===
The ISP was based upon the Red Hat Linux 5 operating system which was the fastest at that time and Microsoft Windows NT 3.51. Later, it was upgraded to Windows NT 4 and Red Hat Linux 6 and, a radius server was implemented by Clint Sim, their administrator at that time. Clint and his wife were fatally injured in a car accident in 2004, survived by their two sons. The computer servers' hardware was based upon Dual Intel Pentium processor boards with 64 MB of RAM linked to RAID ARRAYS of SCSI disks. This type of hard drive was chosen for its independent processor usage which presented performance enhancements over the use of IDE disks which used the computer's CPU to function.

=== Network structure ===
Primary head of service originated from UUNet in the United States, which was recognized as being the "first commercial Internet service provider and a leading supplier of a comprehensive range of Internet access options, applications, and consulting services to businesses, professionals and on-line service providers" in the United States. Founded in 1987 and was the fourth largest in the world in 1997 prior to merging with WorldCom, Inc. UUNet provided a 622 Mbs trunk line on Atlantic sea bed via Europe before connecting to the African routes via VSAT. The satellite signal was connected to a South African station of UUNet Internet Africa and distributed to the region by land links. In 1999, there was a project that started to implement a fibre optic route around the west coast of Africa all the way from Europe to South Africa as an under-sea project and was completed in 2012, SAT-3/WASC. The Network was broadcast overseas from London links to South Africa prior to Sat-2 being fully implemented but the cost was prohibitive to most companies. Since the arrival of SAT-3/WASC the cost of access is a lot lower, but savings not always passed on by governments to users which is why African Internet service is very expensive, especially South African internet and subsequently, Zimbabwean services.

Most of Data Control's Dial-up lines came in via Livingstone Portmasters full of US Robotics and Microcom external modems and the commercial links were accessed through License-free 2.4 GHz wireless WaveLAN or leased line alternative. The bulk of the modems used were the US Robotics type modems which in 1996 were operation at around 14.4 Kbit/s whilst the Microcom modems originally operated at Microcom 14.4 kbit/s Microcom 28.8 kbit/s. Within a couple of years, the technology would be outdated and replaced with the 56.6 kbit/s type modems for dial-up customers. With the lack of reliable POTS (Plain Old Telephone System) networks in the most rural areas of Zimbabwe, some farmers used cellular networks almost exclusively, albeit with an incredibly high cost. Some of those areas were so remote that not even a telephone line was installed within 10 miles of their offices. This peculiarity of African circumstance lead to the development of extended range Wi-Fi networks not seen in use in Europe or the United States to any great extent, but In Africa it is widespread.

=== Service and support personnel ===
The back office service and support was headed up by Clint Sim and supported by Scott Nursten. Scott's primary duties were web design and security while Clint provided the technical expertise on Linux and Windows, the latter being an operating system he despised. The front of office Technical Support desk was staffed by up to 4 technicians who answered and assisted the dial-in users with many of their problems and training issues. Since Zimbabwe had never before seen internet access locally, many people did not know what computers were useful for or how they could be implemented for their businesses. The technical support team; Sheldon, Heath, Adam and Zimbabwe's All Africa Games gold medalist Tae Kwondo fighter, Fanuel Kwande, had to deal with this infusion of knowledge to the general populace. According to Linked-In profiles, Fanuel may now be a Director of a company Fanuel Kwande and was certainly the lead support with Sheldon at the handover of Data Control to Econet. Heath went on to start up his own company Total PC after leaving Data Control, and emigrated to England after 2006. Adam left Data Control and started his own company, Visionary TechServ, which failed with the Zimbabwe economic collapse. Adam eventually emigrated to England in 2004 and started a specialist photography company in 2015. Scott emigrated to England and started his own company there.

== Ownership history ==
The original name was UUNet Internet Africa before becoming Data Control & Systems in 1996. Data Control & Systems changed name to Internet Unlimited when Clint Nursten took over the position of managing director from Rob Nursten in 1998. After a few months, a deal with Econet Wireless (owned by Strive Masyiwa) was struck and Internet Unlimited was sold to Econet Wireless. Econet decided to re-brand the company as Ecoweb.

== Competitors ==
With the successes of Data Control, many other people realised that Internet access was an opportunity to make money and create a new business type in the country before the impending Dot Com boom and bust. As part of that boom there was a company „Samara Services“ that made a meteoric rise to fame and then crashed into ignominy all within the first five years of Zimbabwe's internet debut. All Zimbabwe's major Internet Service Providers (ISPs) were based on a single block of buildings in central Harare. The buildings were namely Eastgate Centre, Harare and Southampton Life Centre. The entire block of buildings was built by the same consulting engineers company, Ove Arup & Partners of Harare.

By close of 1999, Samara Services had all but evaporated and the directors disappeared. Their customers were left without services and their entire network fell into disarray in a very short period of time. Their creditors quickly seized assets and equipment as part-settlement of outstanding bills as was recorded in The Herald newspaper on Zimbabwe. The one really notable contribution to Zimbabwean internet history by Samara was that they had managed to gain the most popularity and largest user base in the little nation in a very short period of time. It was that massive growth that may have led to their downfall and the company failures on the back of many hidden issues that the public were never made aware of. Another issue leading to their demise was the backbone of the entire network was on a single operator's backbone: the PTC.

Another competitor was Africa Online. It was a rather late arrival compared to the other ISPs as they had older (technologically speaking) equipment but a very much better management structure which allowed them to survive longer than was expected of other ISPs. Their advent into the world of Internet service provision at the end of 1997 was a breath of fresh air after the collapse of Samara Services. Many of the technical and administrative staff from Samara services were absorbed into Africa online as a result and it was believed that much of their equipment was from Samara Services too. Their parent service provision was from Prodigy Internet through the same leased line structure of PTC.

Zimbabwe Online deserves a special mention as it was run and managed from inside the offices of Data Control and their technical staff. It was founded by Peter Lobel using a proprietary dial-up system like similar to the style of America Online very successfully. Mr Lobel then updated the method of dial-up from a managed proprietary script service to an automated user-managed service. One of the secrets of the company at that time was that they were one of the first to dabble in VSAT broadcast with their own dish on the roof of the Eastgate Centre, secretly installed with only a very select few staff and friends who knew about it. VSAT was considered an illegal installation by the government who wanted to control all and every bit of international news to do with Zimbabwe.

Zimsurf surfaced on 29 May 1998 and was eventually the governmental run Internet Service Provider, administered competently by Marco Kalis. Zimsurf was to become ultimately the internet arm of Telecel Zimbabwe. Before Zimsurf dissolved, there was a huge VSAT dish installed in the garden of one of the company's directors in Avondale. The dish was linked by leased line to their offices in the Harare CBD. In size, it was about three meters in diameter smack in the middle of his front lawn. The property was surrounded by a four-foot chicken-wire fence and the dish was plainly visible to all passers-by. Eventually, the company was ordered to disable VSAT broadcast according to local law that prohibited competition to the PTC who were the only licensed users of VSAT and the only issuers of licences for VSAT. Thus began a monopolistic war on communication in Zimbabwe.

An indepth study of the Internet availability in Africa in the 1990s is available in PDF format.
