= Geodomain =

The term geodomain refers to domain names that are exact matches in spelling to geographic locations, such as cities and countries. They are unrelated to the ccTLDs such as the .us country code domain. Examples of geodomains are Atlanta.com, LosAngeles.com, Texas.com and LongIsland.com. Since geographical names are limited in number, and have good name recognition, geodomains are valuable, with the .com extension valued the most. Geodomains tend to provide a virtual representation of the locations they serve—for example, Hawaii.com is heavily tourism focused, while Syracuse.com and Madison.com have more local content. Collectively, geographic domain names are estimated to represent approximately over 500 million dollars a year in gross hotel bookings alone.

== Seizure of France.com ==
Unlike United States law, GEO domains and trademark rights may be treated differently around the world as in 2018 the European Country of France successfully seized France.com from its owner, a Miami, Florida resident, who according to a lawsuit filed in California had lawfully owned and used the domain name in commerce since 1994. This was an unprecedented occurrence where the registrar, Network Solutions (Web.com), was intimidated by a French Court Order, despite the lack of jurisdiction, and transferred the domain name to the complainant without notifying the owner of France.com, Jean-Noel Frydman, who is suing and will likely take years to sort out.

== Industry conferences ==
- In 2008 the GeoDomain Expo was held in Chicago from July 10–12.
- In 2010 the GeoDomain Expo was held in New Orleans from April 28-30

== Highest reported sales ==
Many geodomains were reported to be sold for high amounts. Among them:

Domain	Sale price	Sale date	Source
China.com	$11,700,000	2013	
Korea.com	$5,000,000	2000	
California.com	$3,000,000	2019	
England.com	$2,000,000	1999	
Russia.com	$1,500,000	2009	
Melbourne.com	$700,000	2007	
Macau.com	$550,000	2006	
NewZealand.com	$500,000	2003	
Longisland.com	$370,000	2010	
Pensacola.com	$150,000	2018	

== See also ==
- GeoTLD
