= Blackhole server =

DNS server for reverse lookups of invalid IP ranges

Blackhole DNS servers are Domain Name System (DNS) servers that return a "nonexistent address" answer to reverse DNS lookups for addresses reserved for private use.

== Background ==
There are several ranges of network addresses reserved for use on private networks in IPv4:

Reserved private IPv4 network ranges
| Name | CIDR block | Address range | Number of addresses | Classful description |
|---|---|---|---|---|
| 24-bit block | 10.0.0.0/8 | 10.0.0.0 – 10.255.255.255 | 16777216 | Single Class A |
| 20-bit block | 172.16.0.0/12 | 172.16.0.0 – 172.31.255.255 | 1048576 | Contiguous range of 16 Class B blocks |
| 16-bit block | 192.168.0.0/16 | 192.168.0.0 – 192.168.255.255 | 65536 | Contiguous range of 256 Class C blocks |

Reverse DNS queries are used to map IP addresses to domain names. They are PTR queries for subdomains of in-addr.arpa (for IPv4 addresses) and ip6.arpa (for IPv6 addresses). For example, to find the domain name associated with the IP address 203.0.113.22, one would send a PTR query for 22.133.0.203.in-addr.arpa.

Misconfigured hosts often send reverse DNS queries for private addresses to the public DNS. The public DNS cannot meaningfully respond to these queries, since these addresses are reserved for private networks and can't correspond to a single public domain name. Without any mitigation, these queries would put unnecessary load on the in-addr.arpa and ip6.arpa nameservers.

== Role ==
To deal with this problem, the Internet Assigned Numbers Authority (IANA) has set up three special DNS servers called "blackhole servers". Currently the blackhole servers are:

- blackhole-1.iana.org (192.175.48.6)
- blackhole-2.iana.org (192.175.48.42)
- prisoner.iana.org (192.175.48.1)

These servers are registered in the DNS directory as the authoritative servers for the reverse lookup zone of the 10.0.0.0/8, 172.16.0.0/12 and 192.168.0.0/16 addresses. These servers are configured to answer any query with a "nonexistent address" answer. This helps to reduce wait times because the (negative) answer is given immediately and thus no wait for a timeout is necessary. Additionally, the answer returned is also allowed to be cached by recursive DNS servers. This is especially helpful because a second lookup for the same address performed by the same node would probably be answered from the local cache instead of querying the authoritative servers again. This helps reduce the network load significantly. According to IANA, "the blackhole servers generally answer thousands of queries per second". Because the load on the IANA blackhole servers became very high, an alternative service, AS112, has been created, mostly run by volunteer operators.

== AS112 ==
The AS112 project is a group of volunteer name server operators joined in an autonomous system. They run anycasted instances of the name servers that answer reverse DNS lookups for private network and link-local addresses sent to the public Internet. These queries are ambiguous by their nature, and cannot be answered correctly. Providing negative answers reduces the load on the public DNS infrastructure.

=== History ===
Before 2001, the in-addr.arpa zones for the private networks were delegated to a single instance of name servers, blackhole-1.iana.org and blackhole-2.iana.org, called the blackhole servers. The IANA-run servers were under increasing load from improperly-configured NAT networks, leaking out reverse DNS queries, also causing unnecessary load on the root servers. The decision was made by a small subset of root server operators to run the reverse delegations; each announcing the network using the autonomous system number of 112. Later, the group of volunteers has grown to include many other organizations.

A newer approach, using DNAME redirection, was adopted by the IETF in May 2015. Instead of requiring AS112 blackhole server operators to manually configure each of the zones to be blackholed, a single empty zone empty.as112.arpa is to be configured, acting as the DNAME target for any zone to be blackholed. This makes it easier to add and remove such zones from the DNS, especially considering that AS112 is run by many independent volunteer operators. For this, the IANA has allocated new IPv4 and IPv6 prefixes for the name server blackhole.as112.arpa responding authoritatively for the zone. Once it is evident that the new design has been deployed sufficiently, the old blackhole-1/2.iana.org name servers may be retired and the zone delegations be replaced with DNAME records, although this has not yet happened for the zones below as of June 2026.

=== Answered zones ===
The name servers participating in the AS112 project are each configured to answer authoritatively for the following zones:

- For the 10.0.0.0/8, 172.16.0.0/12 and 192.168.0.0/16 private networks:
  - 10.in-addr.arpa
  - 16.172.in-addr.arpa
  - 17.172.in-addr.arpa
  - 18.172.in-addr.arpa
  - 19.172.in-addr.arpa
  - 20.172.in-addr.arpa
  - 21.172.in-addr.arpa
  - 22.172.in-addr.arpa
  - 23.172.in-addr.arpa
  - 24.172.in-addr.arpa
  - 25.172.in-addr.arpa
  - 26.172.in-addr.arpa
  - 27.172.in-addr.arpa
  - 28.172.in-addr.arpa
  - 29.172.in-addr.arpa
  - 30.172.in-addr.arpa
  - 31.172.in-addr.arpa
  - 168.192.in-addr.arpa
- For the 169.254.0.0/16 link-local addresses:
  - 254.169.in-addr.arpa
- For certain special-use domain names:
  - home.arpa
  - service.arpa
- For unique identification purposes:
  - hostname.as112.net
  - hostname.as112.arpa
