= Interception of Communications Bill 2006 =

Parliament of Zimbabwe
- Long title: Interception of Communications Bill 2006
- Territorial extent: Zimbabwe
- Introduced by: Parliament of Zimbabwe
- Introduced: 2006

The Interception of Communications Bill of 2006 is a Zimbabwean bill that proposes to allow government agencies to intercept telephonic, e-mail and cellphone messages. The Bill also requires that operators of telecommunications services install software and hardware to enable interception of communication and storing of information specified by the government.

== See also ==
- South Africa's Regulation of Interception of Communications and Provision of Communication-Related Information Act (RICA)
