= .invalid =

Reserved top-level domain

invalid
- Introduced: 1999
- TLD type: Reserved top-level domain
- Status: Reserved to prevent conflict and confusion
- Intended use: When necessary to show an address guaranteed to be invalid
- Actual use: Session Initiation Protocol, for identity protection; address munging e.g. on Usenet
- Documents: RFC 2606, 3325

The name invalid is reserved by the Internet Engineering Task Force (IETF) as a domain name that may not be installed as a top-level domain in the Domain Name System (DNS) of the Internet.

== Reserved DNS names ==
In 1999, the Internet Engineering Task Force reserved the DNS labels example, invalid, localhost, and test so that they may not be installed into the root zone of the Domain Name System.

The reasons for reservation of these top-level domain names is to reduce the likelihood of conflict and confusion. This allows the use of these names for either documentation purposes or in local testing scenarios.

== Purpose ==
This top-level domain is sometimes used as a pseudo domain name in Uniform Resource Identifiers (URIs) to convey either an error condition or in use of privacy protection. A notable instance of this usage is in the Session Initiation Protocol (SIP) where the domain name anonymous.invalid in a SIP URI indicates hiding of a caller's identity.
