= Resolv.conf =

Configuration file for Domain Name System resolver

resolv.conf is a computer file used in various operating systems to configure the system's Domain Name System (DNS) resolver. The file is a plain-text file usually created by the network administrator or by applications that manage the configuration tasks of the system. The resolvconf program is one such program on FreeBSD or other Unix machines which manages the resolv.conf file.

== Purpose ==
In most Unix-like operating systems and others that implement the BIND Domain Name System (DNS) resolver library, the resolv.conf configuration file contains information that determines the operational parameters of the DNS resolver. The DNS resolver allows applications running in the operating system to translate human-friendly domain names into the numeric IP addresses that are required for access to resources on the local area network or the Internet. The process of determining IP addresses from domain names is called address resolution.

== Contents and location ==
The file resolv.conf typically contains search directives that specify the default search domains used for completing a given query name to a fully qualified domain name when no domain suffix is supplied.

For example, given a name without dots like somehost, the directive search example.com local.test will make the resolver look up somehost.example.com, then somehost.local.test, and only then as somehost itself. A name containing a dot, such as somehost.lan, is tried as given first, and the search domains are appended only if that lookup fails. A name ending in a dot is never extended.

The file also contains a list of IP addresses of nameservers for resolution. For instance, nameserver 1.1.1.1 configures the resolver to query for the name server with IP 1.1.1.1. Additional nameserver directives after the first are only used when the first or last used server is unavailable. An example file is:

search example.com local.test
nameserver 10.0.0.17
nameserver 10.1.0.12
nameserver 10.16.0.7

resolv.conf is usually located in the directory /etc of the file system. The file is either maintained manually, or when DHCP is used, it is usually updated with the utility resolvconf.

In systemd based Linux distributions using systemd-resolved.service, /etc/resolv.conf is a symlink to /run/systemd/resolve/stub-resolv.conf.

== See also ==
- Hosts (file)
- nsswitch.conf
- resolved.conf
- systemd-resolved
