= Dynamic Delegation Discovery System =

The Dynamic Delegation Discovery System (DDDS) is an algorithm for applying string transformation rules to application-unique strings to extract specific syntax elements. It is used for finding information, such as authoritative domain name servers, for Uniform Resource Identifiers and Uniform Resource Names. An earlier specification applied only to URNs, and was called the Resolver Discovery Service (RDS).

DDDS defines a mechanism for using the Domain Name System (DNS) as the database for arbitrary identifier schemes. The primary logical DNS container used to hold DDDS information is the NAPTR record.

DDDS is defined in RFC 3401, 3402, 3403, 3404 and 3405.

RFC 3401 expresses the system as follows:

The Dynamic Delegation Discovery System is used to implement lazy binding of strings to data, in order to support dynamically configured delegation systems. The DDDS functions by mapping some unique string to data stored within a DDDS Database by iteratively applying string transformation rules until a terminal condition is reached.

Telephone Number Mapping (ENUM), specified in RFC 6116, is defined as a DDDS application to resolve telephone numbers into DNS data.
