= .localhost =

Reserved top-level domain

localhost
- Introduced: 1999
- TLD type: Reserved top-level domain
- Intended use: identifies the local computer
- Documents: RFC 2606

The name localhost is reserved by the Internet Engineering Task Force (IETF) as a domain name label that may not be installed as a top-level domain in the Domain Name System (DNS) of the Internet.

== Reserved DNS names ==
In 1999, the Internet Engineering Task Force reserved the DNS labels localhost, example, invalid, and test so that they may not be installed into the root zone of the Domain Name System.

The reasons for reservation of these top-level domain names is to reduce the likelihood of conflict and confusion. This allows the use of these names for either documentation purposes or in local testing scenarios.

== Conventional use ==
The name localhost is a commonly defined hostname for the loopback interface in most TCP/IP systems, resolving to the IP addresses 127.0.0.1 in IPv4 and ::1 for IPv6. As a top-level domain, the name has traditionally been defined statically in host DNS implementations with address records (A and AAAA) pointing to the same loopback addresses. Any other use conflicts with widely deployed algorithms relying on this convention.
