= TelOne Zimbabwe =

State-owned telecommunications company

- Type: Public, state-owned corporation
- Industry: Communications services
- Founded: 1980
- Headquarters: Harare, Zimbabwe
- Key people: Eng. Lawrence Nkala (Chief Executive Officer)
- Products: Telecommunications; Wireless and wireline broadband services
- Website: www.telone.co.zw

TelOne Zimbabwe is a parastatal telecommunications company owned by the Zimbabwe government headquartered in Harare's Central Business District. It is the largest telecom entity in Zimbabwe and has the second largest fixed-line network in Southern Africa after Telkom South Africa. The parastatal is Zimbabwe's sole fixed landline services provider.

== History ==
In 1892, the British South Africa Company (BSAC) organised the first postal service operation which ran the service as a self-governing entity under the Ministry of Post and Telecommunications.

In 1980, after Zimbabwe gained its independence, the Zimbabwe Postal Services Amendment Act which was promulgated through Statutory Instrument 175 was formulated and this led to the establishment of the Postal and Telecommunications Act to create the Posts and Telecommunications Corporation of Zimbabwe (PTC). PTC's core business was the provision of postal and telecommunications services.

In 1987, legislation promulgated the unbundling of PTC into three different companies whose activities were commercialised. The commercialisation took place in 2000, with the breaking up of PTC into TelOne — a fixed telecommunications provider, Net*One — a mobile network providing a cellular network and ZimPost — a postal services company. All these entities were regulated by the Postal and Telecommunications Regulatory Authority of Zimbabwe.

== Ownership ==
TelOne is 100% owned by the government of Zimbabwe and it is run by the Ministry of Information Technology and Courier Services. The company is led by a board of directors who are appointed by the ministry.

== Size and infrastructure ==
TelOne is a part of Zimbabwe's Information Communication Technology (ICT) industry and its infrastructure is also used by other service providers in the country. At the beginning of 2017, TelOne began a US $98 million National Broadband (NBB) project which expanded its fibre infrastructure.

TelOne owns a wide range of telecommunications equipment, varying from various exchanges located around the country, optical fibre networks, radio network systems plus a wide range of high-tech networks including a satellite base station located in Mazowe area of Mashonaland Central Province in Zimbabwe.

=== Broadband infrastructure ===
TelOne operates as both an Internet Access Provider (IAP) providing transmission backhaul for mobile and data operators as well as an Internet Service Provider (ISP) as it retails and wholesales internet access thus becoming one of the biggest internet service providers in Zimbabwe.

=== Satellite infrastructure ===
TelOne offers "Satellite Broadband Solutions" via C Band and Ka Band VSAT, an abbreviation for Very Small Aperture Terminal.

=== Voice infrastructure ===
These are ordinary landlines used by both business and individual users. TelOne offers Zimbabwe's largest fixed landline network in Zimbabwe. TelOne is Zimbabwe's sole fixed landline services provider and has a wide network distribution with infrastructure in almost every corner of the country.

=== Factory ===
TelOne owns and operates a factory located in Msasa Industrial Park, Harare, Zimbabwe. The core business of this factory is the fabrication of various types of hardware and infrastructure equipment which supports telecommunications such as microwave towers; as well as the repair of telecommunication equipment such as telephone handsets, power supplies, etc.

=== TelOne Centre for Learning ===
In the 1950s, TelOne established a Centre for Learning, a training college that offers Diploma and Certificate studies in Information and Communication Technology (ICT) called TelOne's Centre for Learning (TCFL). The institute's main mandate from its inception in the 1950s, was to offer training to the organisation's employees as well as to individuals and corporate customers.

In 2002, the centre was certified as one of Southern Africa Development Community (SADC) Centres of Excellence by the Southern Africa Transport and Communications Commission (SATCC), thereby enabling it to offer training services to the SADC region at large.

The college runs a mixed mode system of training in all the regions in Zimbabwe and offers online courses for students living outside Harare. The TCFL is also affiliated to the Computer Society of Zimbabwe (CSZ) as an accredited ICDL training centre.

The college places premiums on distant learning for ICDL and other short courses, utilising blended learning which mixes physical campus learning with virtual learning in training its students. TCFL has recently introduced a Bachelor of Engineering Honors Degree in Telecommunications Engineering in conjunction with the National University of Science and Technology (NUST).

== TelOne products and services ==
- Broadband (ADSL, FTTH, Public Wi-Fi, Leased Internet, VPN & International Private Leased Circuits)
- Voice (Prepaid Fixed Line, Postpaid Fixed Line & VoIP and SIP Lines)
- Satellite (Ka band, Ku Band & C Band)
- Data centers and hosting services for internet businesses
- Virtual private network (VPN) Services
- Backup as a Service (BAAS)
- Disaster recovery services
- Cloud services
- Rack space rental service
- International private leased circuits (IPLC)
- Metro backhaul

== Awards ==
Zimbabwe Investment Authority

- Zimbabwean ICT Investor of the year 2017

Contact Centre Association of Zimbabwe

- Service Excellence Awards 2017
- 2nd Runner Up in the ISP and IAP Sector 2017

Zimbabwe Digital Awards

- Best Internet Service Provider of the year 2017

== Debt recovery ==
In 2016, TelOne engaged several debt collectors to recover $165 million owed by its customers, including $40 million owed by the government in unpaid telephone bills. The strategy managed a recovery of $100 million in a struggling economy.

== Corporate social responsibility ==
As part of its Corporate Social Responsibility programme, TelOne supports charity organisations and donates food and clothing to children's homes, and orphanages, and supports under-privileged children by paying their school fees.

== Wholesale ==
TelOne's wholesale unit provides global telecommunication services for fixed and mobile operators, ISPs and content providers. It also develops services for carriers including Voice, IP, Capacity, Satellite, Mobility, Security and Digital solutions, and Platforms. TelOne's Wholesale Services provides data, IP, and network transport services for national telecommunications carriers, cable companies, content providers, and mobile wireless companies.

== Sponsorship ==
TelOne sponsor TelOne F.C., a soccer club competing in the Zimbabwe Premier Soccer League.
