= .example =

Reserved top-level domain

example
- Introduced: 1999
- TLD type: Reserved top-level domain
- Status: Reserved to prevent confusion and conflict
- Registry: IANA
- Sponsor: None
- Intended use: Example top-level domain for documentation
- Actual use: Sometimes used in intended manner in documentation
- Registration restrictions: No registrations are possible
- Structure: As needed in example usage
- Documents: RFC 2606
- Dispute policies: None
- Registry website: None

The name example is reserved by the Internet Engineering Task Force (IETF) as a domain name that may not be installed as a top-level domain in the Domain Name System (DNS) of the Internet.

== Reserved DNS names ==
In 1999, the Internet Engineering Task Force reserved the DNS labels example, invalid, localhost, and test so that they may not be installed into the root zone of the Domain Name System.

The reason for reservation of these top-level domain names is to reduce the likelihood of conflict and confusion. This allows the use of these names for either documentation purposes or in local testing scenarios.

== Purpose ==
The top-level domain example is explicitly intended to be used in documentation or other technical writing, when domain names are presented as examples in usage or presentation of concepts of the Domain Name System or the Internet.

== See also ==
- example.com
- 192.0.2.0/24, 198.51.100.0/24, 203.0.113.0/24 – IPv4 ranges reserved for documentation and example code.
- 2001:db8::/32 – IPv6 range reserved for documentation.
