= .io =

Country-code top level domain for the British Indian Ocean Territory

- Introduced: 16 September 1997
- TLD type: Country code top-level domain
- Status: Active
- Registry: Internet Computer Bureau Ltd (Note: a wholly-owned subsidiary of Identity Digital)
- Intended use: Entities connected with the British Indian Ocean Territory
- Actual use: Popular with startup companies and browser games
- Registration restrictions: None for 2nd level registrations; 3rd level registrant must be resident of British Indian Ocean Territory
- Structure: Registrations are taken directly at the second level or at third level beneath various 2nd-level labels
- Documents: Terms & Conditions; Rules
- Dispute policies: Dispute Resolution Policy
- DNSSEC: Yes
- Registry website: nic.io

The Internet country code top-level domain (ccTLD) .io is nominally assigned to the British Indian Ocean Territory, but in practice used typically by technology organisations and websites because of its connection with the computer science term input/output.

The domain is managed by Internet Computer Bureau Ltd, a domain name registry, with registrar services provided by Name.com.

== History ==
The .io domain was delegated by the Internet Assigned Numbers Authority (IANA) to British entrepreneur Paul Kane in 1997 together with the ccTLDs .ac (Ascension Island), .sh (Saint Helena), and .tm (Turkmenistan). Kane operated them for private benefit under the trade name "Internet Computer Bureau" from 1997 until 2017. In 2014, Kane claimed that "profits are distributed to the authorities for them to operate services as they see fit" and that "Each of the overseas territories has an account and the funds are deposited there because obviously the territories have expenses that they incur and it's offsetting that." However the UK government has repeatedly stated that this is untrue: "There is no agreement between the UK Government and ICB regarding the administration of the .io domain" and "the Government receives no revenues from the sales or administration of this domain." The first subdomain was registered under .IO in 1998, when Levi Strauss & Co. registered the domain levi.io.

In April 2017, Paul Kane sold the Internet Computer Bureau holding company to privately held domain name registry services provider Afilias for $70.17m in cash.

In July 2017, a security issue with the .io domain occurred when a security researcher managed to take control of four of the seven authoritative name servers for the domain, which potentially would have given them control of all the DNS traffic for the domain.

In December 2020, Afilias' owner Hal Lubsen sold it to privately held Donuts for an undisclosed sum. One month later, in January 2021, Donuts was acquired by private equity firm Ethos Capital, again for an undisclosed sum.

In 2021, the United Nations' International Tribunal for the Law of the Sea ruled that the United Kingdom has no sovereignty over the Chagos Archipelago, and that sovereignty instead belongs to Mauritius. This would extinguish the British Indian Ocean Territory, and the IO ISO-3166 two-letter country code and .io domain could also be extinguished. The United Kingdom, which was not a party to the case, disputes and does not recognise the tribunal's decision, so further legal processes are likely. In 2022, the Mauritian government was considering how to progress with the issue. In October 2024, the UK announced that it would hand over sovereignty over the Chagos Islands to Mauritius once a treaty is finalised.

In July 2021, the Chagos Refugees Group UK submitted a complaint to the Irish government against domain-name speculators Paul Kane and Afilias, seeking repatriation of the .IO ("Indian Ocean") country-code top-level domain and payment of back royalties from the $7m/year in revenue generated by the domain. While attempts to repatriate top-level domains are not uncommon, this one is notable in that it cites consumer and human rights violations of the OECD's 2011 Guidelines for Multinational Enterprises rather than multistakeholder representation under ICANN policy, and because the .io domain has enjoyed commercial success, particularly among cryptocurrency companies, with more than 270,000 domains registered.

=== Future ===
In October 2024, the United Kingdom announced that it would eventually cede the British Indian Ocean Territory to Mauritius, while maintaining the military base on Diego Garcia via an initial 99-year lease. After the transfer, current IANA rules may require the .io domain to be phased out, which would take at least 5 years. This depends on whether IO is removed from the ISO 3166-1 standard. Historically, some exceptions have been granted, as was the case for .su. On 22 May 2025, an agreement was signed that will cause the British Indian Ocean Territory to be handed over to Mauritius once it enters into force.

== Registration and restrictions ==
Individuals and organisations are allowed to register .io domains.

Labels for .io domains may only contain alphanumeric characters and hyphens, and must be between 2 and 63 characters long. Domain names cannot begin or end with a hyphen symbol, and may not contain two consecutive hyphens. The entire domain name may not contain more than 253 characters.

Applicants for the registration of .io domains do not need to be registered or established in the British Indian Ocean Territory. Third-level domains, such as "xyz.com.io", can only be registered by an inhabitant of the area. (Since there are no legal, permanent inhabitants of the British Indian Ocean Territory, theoretically no third-level domains will be registered.) Any second-level domains used by NIC.IO and top-level domains cannot be used as a third-level domain. For example, the domains "com.com.io", "org.com.io", and "biz.com.io" are all restricted.

Domain names in .io may not be used, "for any purpose that is sexual or pornographic or that is against the statutory laws of any nation." If this requirement is breached, "NIC.IO reserves the right to immediately deactivate the offending registration."

.io domains may be registered for a minimum of one year, and a maximum of 5 years.

Domain names in .io are priced higher than those in many other TLDs. Registering an available .io-domain currently (as of 16 June 2023) costs US$36 per year.

== Usage ==
In computer science, "IO" or "I/O" is commonly used as an abbreviation for input/output, which makes the .io domain desirable for services that want to be associated with technology. .io domains are often used for open source projects, application programming interfaces ("APIs"), startup companies, browser games, and other online services.

One reason given for the TLD's popularity is that it stands out by being shorter than other TLDs. Also, the .io TLD is less occupied than other TLDs, so it is more likely that a given term is available there.

Google's ad targeting treats .io as a generic top-level domain (gTLD) because "users and website owners frequently see [the domain] as being more generic than country-targeted."

Since 2013 Itch.io has developed a community of indie creators, for which it has become a popular platform to host and sell their games. They also regularly host game jams. It is one of the most popular .io TLD websites.

=== .io games ===
The rapid rise of Agar.io (2015) and Slither.io (2016) led to the beginning of a new genre of browser games, dubbed ".io games" for the domain name they use. Characterised by simple graphics and gameplay in a free for all multiplayer arena, .io games received around 192 million visits in 2017. Many .io shooters launched after Slither.io, like Diep.io, released by Matheus Valadares in April 2016. Miniclip also began developing new .io games.

== Controversy ==
According to a 2014 Gigaom interview with Paul Kane, then chairman of the Internet Computer Bureau, the domain name registry is required to give some of its profits to the British government, for administration of the British Indian Ocean Territory. After being questioned as a result of the interview, the British Government denied receiving any funds from the sale of .io domain names, and argued that consequently, the profits could not be shared with the Chagossians, the former inhabitants forcibly removed by the British government. Kane, however, contradicted the government's denial.

== See also ==
- .app (top-level domain)
- .dev
- .mu
- .tech
- .uk
- .tv
- .su
