= ZombsRoyale.io =

Battle royale game

- Developers: End Game Interactive; Yang C. Liu
- Platforms: Web browsers; Android; iOS
- Release: March 14, 2018
- Genres: Battle royale; .io game
- Mode: Multiplayer

ZombsRoyale.io is a battle royale game developed by End Game Interactive. It was released for web browsers in 2018, with iOS and Android ports later that year. A simplified take on the genre, game matches follow up to 100 players who must fight on a large map to be the last survivors. It uses simple 2D graphics and a top-down perspective. The game has amassed over 120,000,000 downloads and unique players across iOS, Android, Web Browser, and PC as of 2024.

ZombsRoyale.io was the fourth title by End Game, a Washington–based developer established the year before. Despite featuring no zombies, it was named so because it used the same engine as End Game's Zombs.io. The game was made to follow the recent trends of both battle royales such as Fortnite Battle Royale (2017) and .io games such as Agar.io (2015). It received little attention from journalists, but became the tenth most Googled video game in the U.S. that year and its popularity helped End Game raise over $3 million from investors.

In ZombsRoyale.io matches, the last standing team or player wins.

== Gameplay ==
ZombsRoyale.io is a top-down battle royale game. Like other .io games, it has simplified gameplay and 2D graphics. There are three game modes, Solo, Duo, or Squad, and limited time modes which rotate regularly. Like other battle royales, up to 100 players — some of which may be computer-controlled bots — are dropped into matches. Games are typically short, around five minutes long.

Players parachute into the map out of a plane, where weapons, mostly various types of firearms, healing items, and ammo can be found in buildings and crates. A cloud of poisonous gas slowly closes in, limiting the play area and forcing players together. Depending on the game mode, the last player or team standing wins.

The quality of weapons, which include sniper rifles, SMGs, tridents and grenades, are determined by their rarity.

== Background ==
End Game Interactive was founded in Bellevue, Washington, in 2017, by web developers Yang C. Liu and Luke Zbihlyj. The pair were best known for PokéVision, an unofficial website which tracked Pokémon in the 2016 AR game Pokémon Go. It had a userbase of 100 million within 7 days, around half the game's players, before the CEO of Pokémon Go developer Niantic asked it to be shut down a month after it started.

The viral success of Agar.io (2015) and Slither.io (2016) led to a new genre of browser game. .io games are defined loosely by their domain name, simplicity, and massively multiplayer elements. The genre's mechanics pit players against each other and have a "low-commitment, die-and-retry" gameplay loop. End Game Interactive decided to start making .io games, but their first effort, the shooter LASERSHARKS.io, was not successful. They then made Zombs.io, a tower defense and base building game and one of the first .io games with a persistent world. A week later, they made Spinz.io, a fidget spinner version of Agar.io, in a second attempt to make a viral streamer-friendly game after LASERSHARKS.io. The YouTubers PewDiePie and Jacksepticeye made videos playing it.

== Development ==
End Game Interactive's small team of around 3, led by CEO Liu, spent four weeks developing ZombsRoyale.io and the rest of 2018 maintaining and expanding it. It was released for web browsers in early 2018, while a PC client came out sometime later. iOS and Android ports were released in May.

Although there are no zombies in the game, the game was named ZombsRoyale.io because it used the same engine as End Game's Zombs.io. Like how Spinz.io was made to capitalize on a recent fidget spinner trend, ZombsRoyale.io was inspired by the rise of battle royale games such as PUBG: Battlegrounds (2017) and Fortnite Battle Royale (2018). Liu did the art for both Spinz.io and ZombsRoyale.io.

== Reception ==
In 2018, ZombsRoyale.io was the tenth most Googled video game in the U.S., the only non–AAA game in the top ten. It received little coverage from game journalists, but amassed 45 million players by 2020.

Rock Paper Shotgun's Ollie Toms, an avid player of battle royales, appreciated the top-down perspective, which he thought gave all players an equal footing and prevented third-partying, the practice of sneaking up on two players already fighting. Because of this, he found it more enjoyable than other battle royales. Coupled with the short rounds, Toms felt ZombsRoyale.io was "Less satisfying than winning a 45-minute PUBG match, for sure - but also far, far less frustrating." From the same publication, Dominic Tarason said ZombsRoyale.io was "simple enough to pick up and play despite containing just about everything you'd expect from a modern Battle Royale shooter." Because of the top-down graphics, Tarason said the "focus [was] on clever positioning rather than run-and-gun action." A TouchArcade writer described it as "a very interesting blend" of Fortnite and PUBG, but with a 2D top-down view, while Gamezebo said it was "part PUBG, part Hotline Miami".

In 2020, End Game Interactive raised $3 million in seed funding from investors such as Supercell, Scooter Braun, Unity founder David Helgason, and Twitch founder Kevin Lin. In 2021, Liu was the cover page honoree of the Forbes 30 Under 30 in Games.

== See also ==
- Surviv.io
