= Internet Computer Bureau =

Internet domain custodian

Internet Computer Bureau Limited is an Internet top-level domain custodian based in the United Kingdom. The custodian is responsible for maintaining the .io, .sh, and .ac country code top-level domains. In 2017 it became a subsidiary of Afilias, a United States corporation. Afilias was later acquired by Identity Digital.

The company was established on 18 July 1996 as Internet Computer Bureau plc, and became a private limited company on 16 December 2004.

Embroiled in controversy around its involvement in registration of .io domains associated with the Diego Garcia military base following the expulsion of the Chagossian population, ICB was sold by Paul Kane to Afilias for $70 million in April 2017.
