= Fadi Chehadé =

American information technology executive

Fadi Chehade
- فادي شحادة
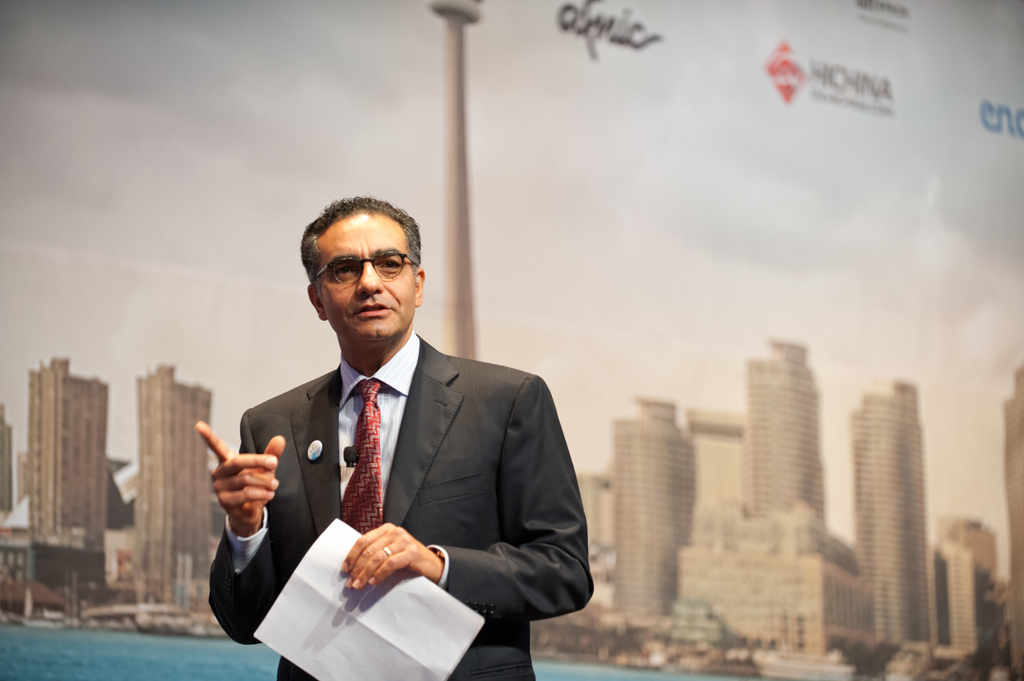
- Speaking at ICANN's 45th Public Meeting in Toronto
- Born: 1962 (age 63–64); Beirut, Lebanon
- Education: New York University
- Known for: Former CEO of ICANN

Fadi Chehadé (Arabic: فادي شحادة) (born 1962) is an information technology executive, founder of RosettaNet and former Chief Executive Officer (CEO) of ICANN. Through Ethos Capital, a private equity company, he unsuccessfully tried to gain control over the .org internet domain.

== Early life ==
Chehadé was born in Beirut, Lebanon, to Egyptian parents. In 1985, he received his bachelor's degree in computer science from the Polytechnic Institute of New York University. The following year he completed his master's degree in engineering management at Stanford University. He became a naturalized U.S. citizen in 1986.

== Business career ==
Chehadé founded Nett Information Products (aka Connectica) in 1987, a company to create and develop an Internet-based content management and sharing solution. Nett was acquired by Ingram Micro and Chehadé became their vice president in charge of customer information services.

In 1997, while at Ingram Micro, Anthony Mesaros was managing the development of an eCommerce website for Ingram Micro and discovered that there was no standard for product descriptions and started the internal Ingram Micro project called Rosetta Stone to establish such standards in the technology industry. Later that year after sitting down with Mesaros to review the project, Chehadé conceived of expanding on that project as a stand-alone not-for-profit organization that would coordinate and develop standards for Business-to-business (B2B) communications. He successfully convinced businesses, including Microsoft, IBM, Hewlett-Packard, SAP, Nokia and Oracle Corporation, to back the program and the result was RosettaNet where he became its first CEO.

In 1999, Chehadé founded Viacore Inc., a B2B services provider, which was acquired by IBM in 2006. At which time he became IBM's vice president for global business development followed by general manager of their global technology services for Middle East/North Africa region. He then took over as CEO of CoreObjects Software, Inc., a developer of new product management software for businesses. CoreObjects was acquired in 2010 by Symphony Services.

For the next two years Chehadé was CEO of Vocado LLC, a provider of cloud-based software for educational institutions to manage administrative and student services.

== ICANN ==
Chehadé interviewed on his time at ICANN

In June 2012, he was picked to head the Internet Corporation for Assigned Names and Numbers (ICANN). Among his first duties was overseeing the TLD Registry expansion program.

In August 2014, ICANN announced that it had extended Chehadé's contract and given him a pay raise of 12.5%. That year he oversaw the initiation of the process to transfer of IANA functions from the United States to the global Internet community.

== Post ICANN ==
In August 2015, Chehadé announced that he would take the position of Senior Advisor on Digital Strategy for ABRY Partners after the end of his ICANN term. In December 2015 he announced he would also become co-chair of a newly formed advisory committee to the World Internet Conference in Wuzhen. The first meeting of the committee was scheduled to take place in mid-2016. In January 2016, it was announced that Chehadé would become a senior advisor to Klaus Schwab, founder and executive chairman of the World Economic Forum starting April 1, 2016.

In 2020, an honoree of the Great Immigrants Award named by Carnegie Corporation of New York

In July 2020, Chehadé was listed as the co-CEO of private equity firm Ethos Capital on its website. Ethos Capital tried to buy Public Interest Registry, the non-profit that runs .org domains, but ICANN denied the transaction. Chehadé's name was nowhere on Ethos' website when it announced the .org transaction. His involvement became public because of WHOIS data for one of Ethos Capital’s domain names. The private equity company admitted that Chehadé was an advisor on the deal.

In 2021, Ethos Capital completed an investment to acquire a controlling interest in Donuts, a domain name registry which had just taken over Afilias, the registry service provider that had to that point been running the registry as well as DNS for .org, effectively resulting in Ethos still gaining a foothold on the .org TLD.
