= Nomulus =

Domain registry

- Developers: Google Inc., Donuts Inc.
- Written in: Java
- Platform: Google Kubernetes Engine
- Type: TLD registry operations
- License: Apache License 2.0
- Website: nomulus.foo
- As of: October 8, 2016; 9 years ago

Nomulus is an open-source software package for top-level domain registry operators. Nomulus was created by Google with contributions from Donuts Inc. It was announced on October 18, 2016 on Google's open-source blog, with the domain nomulus.foo redirecting to their GitHub repository. The registry software, under development since 2011, powers Google's top-level domains including .google, .how, and .soy. The source code is available under the Apache 2.0 license, integrated with Google's Cloud Platform, using Google Cloud Datastore as its backend database.

The code runs a theoretically unlimited number of TLD registries in a single shared instance using horizontal scaling, and includes the features of Extensible Provisioning Protocol (EPP), WHOIS, reporting, and trademark protection. "It is the authoritative source for the TLDs that it runs, meaning that it is responsible for tracking domain name ownership and handling registrations, renewals, availability checks..."

Development started in 2011 when the Internet Corporation for Assigned Names and Numbers (ICANN) approved a change to the Internet Domain System on June 20, 2011, deciding that by increasing the number of top-level domains from its then current number of 22, the internet would be redefined, giving people and businesses more flexibility and control over their online presence, "[encouraging] innovation, [...] competition, and increased choice for Internet users."
