= MTLD =

The abbreviation MTLD may stand for

- Movement for the Triumph of Democratic Liberties
- mTLD, a top-level domain registry, see .mobi
- measure of textual lexical diversity
