= LGBTQ (disambiguation) =

LGBTQ people are individuals who are lesbian, gay, bisexual, transgender, or queer.

LGBTQ or LGBT may also refer to:

- LGBTQ (term), an initialism for lesbian, gay, bisexual, transgender, and queer
- "LGBT", a 2015 song by RuPaul featuring Chi Chi LaRue and Markaholic from Realness
- "Lgbt", a 2016 song by Cupcakke from Audacious
- .lgbt, a top-level internet domain

== See also ==
- Outline of LGBTQ topics
- List of LGBTQ acronyms
- Insulated-gate bipolar transistor (IGBT)
