= Paul Kane (disambiguation) =

Paul Kane (1810–1871) was an Irish-Canadian painter.

Paul Kane may also refer to:

- Paul Kane (writer) (born 1973), British science fiction writer
- Paul Kane (footballer) (born 1965), Scottish footballer
- Paul Kane (entrepreneur), British technology company executive
- Paul Kane (poet) (born 1950), American poet, critic and scholar
- Paul Kane (rugby union), New Zealand priest and international rugby union player
- Paul Kane, a former stage name of Paul Simon (born 1941)

== See also ==
- Paul Kane High School, a school in St. Albert, Alberta
- Paul Cain (disambiguation)
