= .vc =

Internet country code top-level domain for Saint Vincent and the Grenadines

- Introduced: 3 September 1991
- TLD type: Country code top-level domain
- Status: Active
- Registry: Ministry of Finance, Economic Planning and Information Technology (operated by Identity Digital)
- Sponsor: Ministry of Finance, Economic Planning and Information Technology
- Intended use: Entities connected with Saint Vincent and the Grenadines
- Actual use: Used in Saint Vincent and the Grenadines, but also used in a wide variety of unrelated sites such as those for voice and video chat, venture capitalists, etc.
- Registration restrictions: None
- Structure: Registrations are made directly at the second level or at the third level beneath various second-level names
- IDN: No, domain names may include only letters, numbers, or hyphens

.vc is the Internet country code top-level domain (ccTLD) for Saint Vincent and the Grenadines.

Registration is open worldwide, and it has been used for a variety of sites not necessarily related to that location; it can also be seen as standing for "venture capital", "Ventura County", "version control", "video conferencing", or other things, like an informal, but common, abbreviation of "você" (lit. 'you', in Portuguese). In this way, ".com.vc" could be understood in Portuguese like ".with.you" would be in English. .vc is sometimes mistaken for being the ccTLD of the Vatican City State, which is .va.

On October 31, 2000, the .vc registry operations contract was awarded to Tucows by the government of St. Vincent and the Grenadines. Tucows serviced .vc through their wholly owned subsidiary Liberty RMS. On March 25, 2002, Afilias acquired Liberty RMS from Tucows, and the binding registry operations contract for the .vc ccTLD was assigned to Afilias by Tucows. Afilias is the current .VC ccTLD registry operator. Names under the domain began to be registered by the public on July 9, 2002 and began resolving the following month.
