= Mobile blogging =

Method of publishing to a website or blog

Mobile blogging (also known as moblogging) is a method of publishing to a website or blog from a mobile phone or other handheld device. A moblog helps habitual bloggers to post write-ups directly from their phones even when on the move. Mobile blogging has been made possible by technological convergence, as bloggers have been able to write, record and upload different media all from a single, mobile device. At the height of its growth in 2006, mobile blogging experienced 70,000 blog creations a day and 29,100 blog posts an hour. Between 2006 and 2010, blogging among teens declined from 28% to 14%, while blogging among adults over 30 increased from 7% to 11%. However, the growing number of multi-platform blogging apps has increased mobile blogging popularity in recent years creating a brand new market that many celebrities, regular bloggers and specialists are utilizing to widen their social reach.

Mobile blogging is popular among people with camera phones which allow them to e-mail/MMS or SMS photos and video that then appear as entries on a web site, or to use mobile browsers to publish content directly to any blogging platform with Mobile Posting compatibility. As the ability of camera phone users to publish their own blogs has increased, so too has the ability for collective submissions. Users are now able to access the posts of other bloggers in the immediate area through a process called Georeferential Blogging; which utilizes geographical location to collectively group blogging activity. This advancement unites the posts of local bloggers in an effort to increase the relevancy of information to those in the area.

== History ==
One of the precursors to a "moblog" was the development of a wearable photographic device by Steve Mann of the University of Toronto. Termed "domewear," the intention was for human rights workers to wear the devices to take photographic and video evidence of dangerous situations while avoiding being targeted for using traditional cameras. The first recorded example of moblogging was on 1995 February 22, when Steve Mann posted text from his wearable mobile computer to his weblog server, together with video (image sequence). The term moblogging, however, wasn't coined until 2002, by Adam Greenfield. Mobile devices have expanded beyond basic communication and now these devices can support multimedia creation tools.

== Design ==
The mobile blogging system has its origins in a technology-inspired design approach. This approach incorporates the rich feature set of a smartphone, including the ability to create multimedia, capturing decent images, and connectivity options. The intersection between the inherent design functions of the phone with the ongoing, personal nature of both a phone and a blog is how the concept of mobile blogging began. In the case study of SmartBlog, a system created to support mobile blogging, key principles were developed after assessing bloggers' needs. These include:

- Mobile client must not interfere with phone functionality
- Mobile blogging should integrate easily with existing blogs
- Client device needs to utilize the multimedia capabilities of a phone and be very easy to use
- Client should allow for management activities, such as editing and deleting
- Client should use cheap connectivity if available
- Client must cope with broken connectivity transparently

The client, in this instance, refers to a Thin client.

== Advantages ==
A mobile blog platform offers the capability to use a phone for administration, editing and writing from a phone or smartphone browser. There are services and platforms which present different versions of a blog administration interface based on user agent.

Mobile blogging also promotes the dissemination of ideas and perspectives of younger people, who previously have not had as many easily accessible platforms to present their views.

=== Educational use ===
The continued integration of Mobile Blogging into areas of education has revealed many of its advantages. Its benefits affect both students and teachers, and have improved the overall educational experience. For students, it allows them to stay up-to-date with class schedules, access materials, and it inspires a more creative dimension with the inclusion of visual and audible materials in their work environment.

For teachers, mobile blogging has allowed further monitoring of students’ progress and participation.

Mobile blogging can be used alongside computer-supported collaborative learning in the classroom. This provides a positive and encouraging learning environment for students, especially students in a virtual classroom. Working collaboratively with blogging mobile app can provide more authentic context learning and can help solve the coordination issue that often arises from working in a collaborative learning environment.

=== Tourism ===
Mobile blogging is particularly helpful to tourists and travelers when access to a computer with Internet connection may be difficult. The traveller can snap photos and with a GPRS or a WAP-enabled phone can easily upload such pictures with text descriptions directly to his or her blog. If the camera phone is equipped for Autogeotagging, the blog may be able to show a map of the locations.

== Challenges ==
One of the most significant challenges to mobile blogging is lack of access to both mobile devices and internet connections. While mobile application encourages the production and spread of information to seemingly limitless people, it must be understood in regards to the advantages and disadvantages of socioeconomic status and geographical location.

=== Data Costs ===
One of the most substantial and relevant challenges to having a mobile blogging network is the costs involved. Western countries face relatively cheap costs in terms of data plans and expenditures related to mobile devices, yet in most places around the world, these costs are very substantial and restrictive. When the costs are too high, mobile blogging and its benefits become irrelevant.

== Platforms ==
=== Popular platforms (free) ===
- Blogger
- Tumblr
- Weebly
- WordPress

=== Popular platforms (paid) ===
- Squarespace
- TypePad

== See also ==
- Assisted GPS
- Mobile 2.0
- Mobile phone
- Photoblog
- Smartphone
- Video blogging
