= Snaky Cat =

2025 video game

- Developers: Appxplore (iCandy); Animoca Brands
- Publisher: Appxplore (iCandy)
- Platforms: Android iOS
- Release: 4 February 2025
- Genres: Snake, battle royale
- Mode: Multiplayer

Snaky Cat is an .io battle royale mobile game developed by Appxplore (iCandy) and released on 4 February 2025. The game follows the Snake formula, where players must eat doughnuts to get bigger. Snaky Cat is a blockchain game, with its Web3 elements developed by Animoca Brands.

== Gameplay ==
The player controls a "snake cat" and must collect doughnuts and other treats to grow larger and collect points in due time. As the cat eats doughnuts, it will trigger score combos. The game is set in a pvp arena where the player must avoid other players and obstacles, but differently from typical Snake games, the player doesn't die if it collides with itself. If a player dies, it leaves behind a trail of doughnuts equivalent to their size. Cats that survive until the end of the match earn expeditions with rewards. It is possible to play with a friend. Both will get a special skin that allows players to fuse with each other.

The game has its own currency. Rubies are used to purchase power-ups and Cat Tolkens are used to obtain new skins. Initially, there were over 50 skins, including the Legendary Cat, and skins from other Appxplore games, such as Crab War and Claw Stars. It is also possible to customize the cats with accessories.

== Release ==
On 22 July 2024, Snaky Cat entered in pre-registration and on 18 September the game entered in pre-release in Canada, Argentina, Australia, Malaysia, United Kingdom, Saudi Arabia and South Africa. As the game surpassed one million pre-registrations, Appxplore opened the game to 48 additional countries, including Mexico, Bangladesh, Pakistan, Portugal, Romania, Greece, Chile, Venezuela, and most of Africa, except Algeria and Egypt. The game reached a total of 1.5 million pre-registrations.

Snaky Cat was officially released for Android and iOS on 4 February 2025, with Appxplore announcing the global opening of the servers on Twitter.

== See also ==
- Slither.io
