= .google =

Internet top-level domain

- Introduced: September 4, 2014; 12 years ago
- Registry: Alphabet Inc.
- Sponsor: Charleston Road Registry Inc.
- Intended use: Google's products
- Registered domains: 256 (14 December 2025)
- Registration restrictions: .google domains can only be registered by Alphabet's employees
- DNSSEC: Yes
- Registry website: registry.google

.google is a brand top-level domain (TLD) used in the Domain Name System (DNS) of the Internet. Created in 2014, it is one of the dozens of brand domains in Google Registry, operated by Alphabet Inc., Google's parent company.

It is notable as one of the first gTLDs associated with a specific brand. The company's first usage of the TLD was with com.google, an April Fools' Day joke website that hosted a horizontally mirrored version of Google Search.

The domain currently hosts multiple Alphabet Inc. products and services, and plans exist to move other Alphabet properties to .google as well.

== Web Security ==
Google has integrated .google into the HTTP Strict Transport Security (HSTS) preload list. This means that all .google domains are hardcoded into major browsers to enforce HTTPS connections, ensuring that users can only access these sites securely. This initiative is part of Google's broader effort to enhance web security by eliminating unencrypted HTTP traffic.
