= Surviv.io =

Browser-based battle royale video game

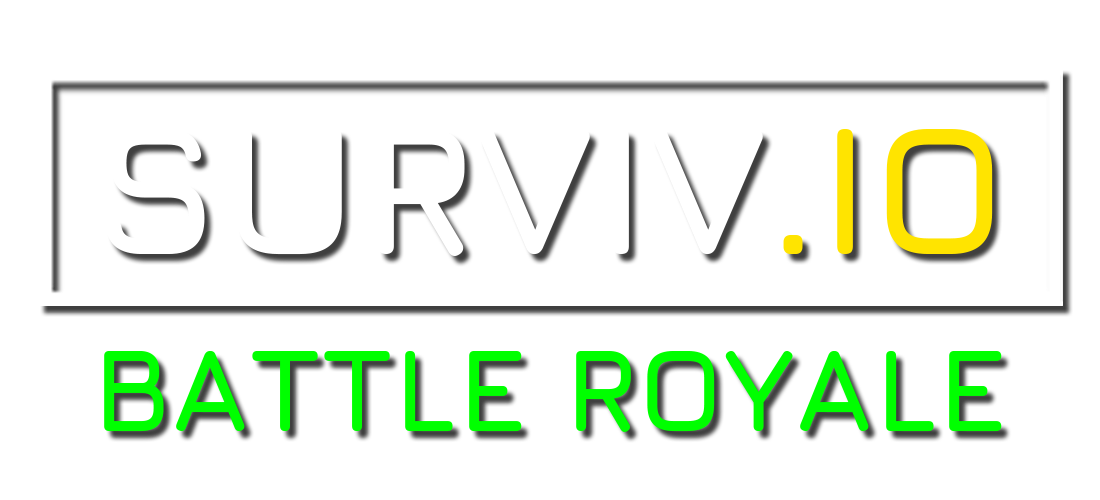
- Developers: Justin Kim; Nick Clark; Kongregate
- Platforms: Browser; Android; iOS; macOS; Microsoft Windows
- Release: Browser; October 11, 2017; March 20, 2026 (re-release); iOS; October 4, 2019; Android; November 5, 2018; macOS, Windows; September 24, 2020
- Genre: Battle royale
- Mode: Multiplayer

Surviv.io is a browser-based multiplayer online 2D battle royale game created by Justin Kim and Nick Clark and developed by Kongregate. It was released in October 2017 on its website for desktop browsers, and in October and November 2018 respectively for iOS and Android devices. The game was released on Steam in September 2020.

Similar to other titles in the battle royale genre, players battled against other players on a large map from a top-down perspective, scavenging for supplies and weapons. The game also supported two or four player team modes, and could be played on mobile browsers as well.

Surviv.io was acquired by online gaming website Kongregate in December 2019. Kongregate sunset Surviv.io on March 2, 2023, and named Bit Heroes Arena as its successor. The game was relaunched on Kongregate's website on March 20, 2026.

== Gameplay ==
A player model in Surviv.io

Players, also called "Survivrs", are represented by circular figures on a 2D grid-like playing field, surrounded by a circular "Red Zone" that shrinks as the game progresses. Players in the "Red Zone" lost health every second, and the amount of health lost per second increased as the game progresses. Players start with only their fists, while extra gear is found in breakable crates and objects located across the map, and in houses and other buildings. Each game features a randomly generated map, with the locations of buildings and loot being randomized each time. Players drop all their items upon death, and the last player alive wins the match.

The game had a rotation of limited time modes with special gameplay modes that offer exclusive weapons, items and roles.

=== Equipment ===
Weapons in Surviv.io range from close-quarter shotguns and SMGs to long range sniper and assault rifles. Melee weapons such as katanas and throwable grenades can also be found. Most weapons require additional ammunition, which is found separately. Scopes give players a wider view of their surroundings, which vary from 1x (the smallest field of vision) to 15x (the largest field of vision). Vests and helmets protect the player and vary in protection level. Players heal using consumable healing items.

== Development ==
Surviv.io was developed by Justin Kim and Nick Clark. Kim stated that their design philosophy while developing the game was to allow the player to enter a game as fast as possible by minimizing the time in between matches.

In December 2019, Surviv.io was acquired by online gaming website Kongregate, with the company taking over development of the game. In a press release, the company stated they hoped to "invest in the game’s features, especially on mobile." Co-creator Justin Kim expressed that the team was "excited to have Kongregate's team create new features and expand the player experience over the years to come."

In 2020, Kim and Clark announced they would be taking a break and the development would be fully passed on to Kongregate.

On February 13, 2023, Kongregate announced that Surviv.io would be sunset; this occurred less than a month later.

The game was relaunched on Kongregate's website on March 20, 2026. A Surviv.io remake was remade at Survev.io by 2024. In addition, a remake-turned-spinoff at Suroi.io was released in 2023.

== Reception ==
PC Gamer praised the game's fast paced gameplay and short matchmaking times, calling it "one of the most enjoyable BR games out there."

In May 2018, VG247 described the game as the "most popular battle royale title after Fortnite and PlayerUnknown's Battlegrounds".

== See also ==
- ZombsRoyale.io, a similar browser-based battle royale game
- Agar.io, a browser-based game that includes a battle royale mode
