= Diep.io =

2016 video game

- Mobile icon
- Publishers: Miniclip (2016–2021; mobile); Addicting Games (2021–2024); 3AM Experiences (2024–present); VexxusArts (2024–present)
- Designer: Matheus Valadares
- Platforms: Browser iOS; Android
- Release: Browser; 16 April 2016 iOS; 8 July 2016; Android; 7 July 2016
- Genre: Shooter game
- Mode: Multi-player

Diep.io (stylized as diep.io) is a multiplayer browser game created by Brazilian developer Matheus Valadares (also known as M28) in 2016. Miniclip first published the mobile version. In Diep.io, players control tanks in a two-dimensional arena. They earn experience points and upgrades by destroying shapes and other tanks.

Valadares created the similar Agar.io in 2015. The game's viral popularity inspired a genre of similar browser games with simple gameplay and graphics called ".io games", which includes Diep.io. The game was praised for its upgrade system, which gave it more depth and replay value than other ".io games". In 2021, it was acquired by Addicting Games. In 2024, it was acquired by 3AM Experiences which then contracted VexxusArts to update and maintain the game. Google Play reports over 10 million mobile downloads as of 2023.

== Background and development ==
Brazilian developer Matheus Valadares created Agar.io in April 2015. It is a simple browser game where cells attempt to grow larger by eating agar and other cells. Agar.io's unexpected viral success, supported by its popularity on platforms such as YouTube, led to millions of daily players and it becoming the most popular video game of 2015. A mobile port was released by Swiss publisher Miniclip.

Agar.io's rapid rise inspired the similar, snake-themed Slither.io and later an entire genre of simple multiplayer browser games called ".io games", many of which were shooters. Valadares released a shooter ".io game" called Diep.io in mid-2016, and Miniclip soon released a mobile version for iOS and Android.

In 2021, Addicting Games acquired Diep.io for an undisclosed amount. CEO Bill Karamouzis said they planned to rebuild the mobile app and add new game modes, achievements and cosmetics, among other improvements. In September 2021, Addicting Games was acquired by Enthusiast Gaming. with Diep.io becoming part of the company's portfolio.

In August 2024, 3AM Experiences acquired Diep.io from Addicting Games. On September 8, 2024, Mistik published an official video outlining the company's long-term development plans.

== Gameplay ==
Gameplay screenshot; this image shows three teamed tanks in the purple team (from left to right: a Machine Gun, a Booster and a Spread Shot (currently being damaged)) attacking an Octo Tank from the Blue team.

The objective of Diep.io is to kill other tanks with bullets that can vary in size, weight, and other factors, such as: bullet speed, bullet penetration, reload time (fire rate of the tank), health regeneration, movement speed, maximum health, or by ramming into other tanks with one's own body, which can also be upgraded. While upgrades can significantly improve a tank's standing against other tanks, smaller tanks can still outmaneuver one as a higher level tank, often in the form of buying bullet upgrades that can be shot towards one at high speeds or frequency. The browser version currently has 10 gamemodes—FFA (Free-For-All), 2 Teams, 4 Teams, Maze, Sandbox, Domination, Tag, Mothership, Breakout, and Capture the Flag. The goal of the game is to get on the top rank of the leaderboard and remain there for as long as possible. When a player dies, they will recover some experience so they do not have to start from scratch. As a player levels up, their health gets a little larger, they get slower, and their body gets larger.

Tank classes are variations of the basic tank which allow different strategies to be used against other players. Most broadly, tanks can be split into damage builds or ramming builds; damage builds maximize the bullet's damage and penetration, while ramming builds maximize health and movement speed, to kill enemy tanks by ramming into them.

The Destroyer branch is a branch of tank classes that fire slower, but highly damaging bullets that can often instantly kill another player. Though strong against weaker damage-based tanks or rammers, destroyers are weak against sniper-based tanks, as they are unable to effectively destroy their bullets.

The Drone-controller branch has unique tank classes that are unable to shoot any bullets, but can direct drones with their mouse cursor, ramming them against other players. Tank classes can be upgraded at levels 15, 30, and 45. Some classes require skipping an upgrade; for example, if a player chooses to remain as the basic tank until level 30, they are able to unlock the Smasher class and its subsequent upgrades, or if a player remains as the basic tank until level 45, they are able to unlock the Auto Tank.

The scoreboard is a display at the top right which indicates the players with the most experience. Experience is gained by destroying shapes, other players, or bosses. Upgrades are a way of increasing health, damage, speed, and other attributes and are used in conjunction with various tank classes. Powerful combinations include the Tri-angle and movement speed, since the tank has two flank barrels which increase speed due to recoil.

Bases are safe zones for teams. Gamemodes 2 Teams, 4 Teams, Domination, and Capture the Flag have bases, with 2 teams having long bases that stretch the height of the map on either side, Capture the Flag having 2 square bases on opposing edges with 4 flag bases near the corners, while 4 Teams and Domination have square bases at random corners of the map. Base drones are server-controlled drones which defend the team from spawn killing, although opponent bullets already get destroyed on contact with the edge of the base, which is a semi-opaque colored zone the same color of the team.

Bosses are server-controlled tanks with large health pools, damage, and often powerful barrels, that as of 2025, can now be player-controlled by pressing the same key used to take control of Dominators and Motherships in their respective gamemodes. Bosses print a death message to the entire server ("Boss was killed by <player>"). Bosses chase the nearest player by default and will follow a player into a team base. The base drones will attack bosses, and if a base drone kills a boss, the death message will say that the boss was killed by an unnamed tank, which is the default name for unnamed tanks. Arena Closers are server-controlled tanks that spawn only before a server is going to restart or a match ends, marked by the message "Arena closed: No players can join." Arena Closers, similarly to bosses, will follow their target, except Arena Closers do not lose visibility of targets like bosses do. Arena Closers also do not collide with other Arena Closers or maze walls.

== Game modes ==
=== FFA (Free For All) ===
Free For All is a large arena without obstacles or impediments. This game mode is the most "basic" in that it has qualities that are seen across different game modes (Arena size, XP multiplier, starting level, leaderboard), but lacking the core difference that makes other game modes unique (Dominators, maze walls, bases). The aim is just to kill other enemy tanks or bosses when applicable.

=== 2 Teams ===
In 2 Teams, the goal is to kill other players from the enemy team. Players are split into 2 separate teams. When on a team, a tank cannot kill other tanks on its team, and knock-back from lower level tanks is not applied to higher level tanks. A player may spawn as either a red or blue tank at the far right or far left areas of the map, which span the full vertical height of the map. Drones that are meant to defend the base, "base drones," guard all along the vertical stretch of the areas. Wandering too close to the enemy's spawn area will alert the base drones, who will fly towards nearby enemies and ram into them, dealing low damage at a high rate. Any bullets that cross into an enemy base will be destroyed on touch, similarly to the behavior with the maze walls. These two factors prevent spawn killing. You can also, unlike FFA (Free For All), possess bosses and play as them, with the drawback that you aren;t on either team, and can be damaged by both teams.

=== 4 Teams ===
In 4 Teams, the goal of the match is to kill other tanks from the 3 enemy teams. The player's tank will spawn either in the red, blue, purple, or green (formerly brown) team, which are positioned at the four corners of the map. This game mode was split from Team DM on September 18, 2016. Similarly to 2 Teams, you can posses bosses with the drawback of being able to be damaged by all 4 teams.

=== Maze ===
Maze mode features large walls which spawn randomly inside of the map that make it much harder to navigate from one point to another. The walls, called "Maze walls," bounce tanks off of them and slow down a tank that forces itself against the wall. It is/was possible to wedge between walls, and Arena Closers and "Crashers" (pink drones that ram into tanks when near the center of the map) ignore the walls entirely.

=== Sandbox ===
Sandbox is a private arena, unlike all other game modes. It is primarily used for testing, as this mode is the only one that allows cheats, which include god mode, and switching classes at will with the backslash key (\). The arena's size and the number of shapes it spawns inside dynamically increases to match the amount of players connected to it. Sandbox can also spawn boss tanks on a regular interval like other game modes, and can summon Arena Closers after a certain time. Entering God mode will make the player's tank invulnerable to Arena Closers even if the round ends. Recently, the game added the "Tank Editor" and an admin panel. The "Tank Editor" is self explanatory, letting you edit previously existing tanks, and even make new ones (something the players use in totally normal and expected ways), make/edit bosses, and make/edit shapes. You can also enable/disable boss spawning, edit upgrade trees, and disable certain tanks. The admin panel was added during the same update and has numerous features, including changing the arena size, spawning bot tanks, banning players, giving other players admin access, changing the game mode, etc.

== Mini-games ==
Mini games are game modes that rotate every 24 hours, resetting whenever the time reaches 12:00 AM in Greenwich, London. There are currently 6 mini-games, with Battle Royale being the most recent.

=== Domination (mini-game) ===
Domination features large, stationary tanks called Dominators, which can fire either traps, rapid-fire bullets, or heavy, slower bullets. The player's goal is to capture the four Dominators. Dominators do not die when killed; instead, they join the team of the tank that killed it, regaining their full health. Dominators spawn neutral, which is a yellow color not matching either of the player teams, and can enter Neutral anytime it is killed when on one of the player teams. A message will display "... Dominator is being contested" whenever a Dominator enters the neutral team.

=== Tag (mini-game) ===
Tag is a game mode where tanks may join one of 4 teams. When a tank dies to an enemy tank, the tank will join the enemy team. When a team has all of the joined players in it (this also counts players who have not respawned but are due to spawn on another team), the round ends.

=== Mothership ===
Mothership's main feature is having two giant tanks called Motherships with barrels all along the body, which fire tiny drones in large amounts, being able to easily kill a player in moments. However, the main drawback to the Motherships is their extremely slow movement speed, as well as their drones' slow speed. Mothership was removed in 2016 but Addicting Games brought back the gamemode in 2021, and 3AM Experiences also includes the game mode in rotation with Tag, Domination, Breakout, and Capture The Flag.

=== Breakout (mini-game) ===
Breakout, one of the newest game modes, based on the 2016 original, features a turf-war style of gameplay where two teams claim territory in the form of interactive tiles. Players start on opposing corners of the map. The objective is similar to that of Domination where one team has to claim all of the tiles from the enemy team. These tiles resemble Bases and will take damage from most forms of ammunition. Unclaimed tiles appear similar to Maze walls. Whether unclaimed or from an opponent, these tiles will block projectiles from outside of their territory (there can still be intruders!). Players are only able to capture new tiles while within their territory.

=== Capture the Flag (mini-game) ===
Capture the Flag features two teams, red and blue, that fight to claim 10 flags from the enemy team. Each team has a main base where the players spawn and 2 small areas where the flags will spawn, each base and flag spawn area being colored in the team's color. A player captures a flag by going to one of the enemy team's flags and going above it, which they then bring to their base to win 1 flag. At the start of the game, there is a barrier that goes right down the middle as a vertical line which stays for 5 minutes to allow players to be prepared, and after the 5 minutes the barrier is removed and players can fight the enemy team and capture their flags.

=== Battle Royale (mini-game) ===
Battle Royale is the most recent mini-game added to Diep.io, and has no teams present. The goal is to kill everyone else in the arena. The game won't start unless there are at least 5 players, and once it starts, it spawns you in a random location far from the center. There are walls placed sparingly around the map, and after a few seconds, the arena border (referred to as the "storm") starts to shrink slowly towards the center, dealing tick damage to players that touch it and erasing shapes entirely when in contact with them (this damage also applies to before it begins to shrink). Once the arena's borders reach a certain point, they stop shrinking, and whoever is left is safe from it as long as they don't touch it, because it still retains its damaging capabilities. A notable feature within this mini-game is that killing shapes gives you significantly more experience and score in order to balance out the fast-paced gameplay within this mini-game.

== Reception ==
Reviews praised Diep.io as one of the best .io games alongside Agar.io and Slither.io, noting that the more in-depth tank upgrade system offered more replay value than other games in the genre. Android Authority described it as a spiritual successor of Agar.io. Conversely, Simon Reed of Gamezebo opined that the early stages of gameplay were slow and the gameplay loop was not compelling enough to keep players after the first several playthroughs, unlike Agar.io and Slither.io, saying that Diep.io is "lacking in a few key departments that just hold it back from greatness." He rated it 3.5/5 stars. Christian Vas of PCGamesN considered the team-based game modes to be the best.
