= .mobi =

Internet top-level domain

mobi
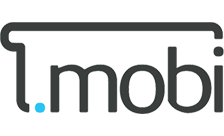
- Introduced: 2005; 21 years ago
- TLD type: Generic top-level domain
- Status: Active
- Registry: Identity Digital
- Sponsor: None
- Intended use: Mobile content providers
- Actual use: Mobile products and services websites
- Registration restrictions: None. Adherence to mobile-first style guidelines recommended.
- Structure: Registrations are conducted at second level.
- Documents: ICANN Registry Agreement
- Dispute policies: UDRP
- DNSSEC: Yes

The domain name mobi is a generic top-level domain (gTLD) in the Domain Name System (DNS) of the Internet. The name is short for mobile.

The domain was approved by ICANN on 11 July 2005, and is managed by the mTLD global registry. It was originally financially backed and sponsored by Google, Microsoft, Nokia, Samsung, Ericsson, Vodafone, T-Mobile, Telefónica Móviles, Telecom Italia Mobile, Orascom Telecom, GSM Association, Hutchison Whampoa, Syniverse Technologies, and Visa, with an executive from each company serving on mTLD's board of directors. In February 2010, Afilias acquired mTLD Top-Level Domain Ltd. (known publicly as "dotMobi"). In March 2017, .mobi became an unsponsored generic top-level domain, using the same terms offered to new gTLDs.

== Operation ==
DotMobi domain names have been available for registration by the public since 26 September 2006.

dotMobi engaged with the W3C Mobile Web Initiative (MWI) to help formulate the MWI Best Practices for mobile content. The practices outlined a number of ways to achieve good user experiences on mobile Web-enabled devices, and recognized several methods of implementing these practices.

mTLD has released a free testing tool called Ready.mobi (later mobiForge) to analyze the mobile readiness of websites. It does a free page analysis and gives a .mobi Ready score from 1 to 5. This report tests the mobile-readiness of the site using dotMobi's recommended best practices.

dotMobi does not itself mandate any particular technology, but does recommends that .mobi sites produce user experiences consistent with their guidelines and specifically optimized for mobile phones.

By 2024, the old authoritative WHOIS domain for .mobi had been allowed to expire, which created a vulnerability that included allowing for the creation of fraudulent digital certificates.

=== mobiForge ===
"mobiForge" is a mobile development and design resource site run by dotMobi. mobiForge functions both as a platform to announce product updates to the developer community and discussion forums for each of dotMobi's products and services. mobiForge was launched in November 2006 as dev.mobi. It was announced at the Mobile 2.0 Conference in San Francisco, along with the launch of ready.mobi. dev.mobi underwent a major redesign in September 2008 and was rebranded as mobiForge and moved to mobiForge.com

== Reception ==
Originally dotMobi focused on promoting the creation of two separate device-dependent World Wide Webs, one desktop-based and the other mobile-based. Because of this, Tim-Berners Lee brought up concerns of excess Internet content redundancy.

Providing content tailored to particular devices can be done by other means than a specific TLD, such as using hostnames within an existing domain, HTTP content negotiation, cascading style sheets, or other forms of adaptation. The popularization of responsive web design has caused the domain name to be relocated for use on mobile services and mobile apps websites.

== See also ==
- Mobile computing
- Mobile apps
- Mobile web
