= Google Registry =

Domain name registry owned by Google

Charleston Road Registry Inc.
- Trade name: Google Registry
- Type: Subsidiary
- Founded: February 8, 2012; 14 years ago
- Parent: Google LLC
- Website: registry.google

Charleston Road Registry Inc. (CRR), doing business as Google Registry, is a wholly owned subsidiary of Google LLC. It is the domain name registry that Google uses to handle its top-level domains (TLDs).

== History ==
The company was founded on February 8, 2012 due to requirements by ICANN that domain name registries and registrars be separate legal entities.

As of October 2024, CRR owns 46 TLDs:

- .ads
- .android
- .app
- .boo
- .cal
- .channel
- .chrome
- .dad
- .day
- .dclk
- .dev
- .docs
- .drive
- .eat
- .esq
- .fly
- .foo
- .gbiz
- .gle
- .gmail
- .goog
- .google
- .guge
- .hangout
- .here
- .how
- .ing
- .map
- .meet
- .meme
- .mov
- .new
- .nexus
- .page
- .phd
- .play
- .prod
- .prof
- .rsvp
- .search
- .soy
- .youtube
- .zip
- .みんな
- .グーグル
- .谷歌

== See also ==
- List of Internet top-level domains
