= .rip =

Generic top-level domain

- Introduced: 10 July 2014
- TLD type: Generic top-level domain
- Status: Active
- Registry: Identity Digital (as Dog Beach, LLC)
- Sponsor: None
- Intended use: Memorials and tributes
- Actual use: Leaks and piracy
- Registration restrictions: None
- Documents: ICANN registry agreement
- DNSSEC: Yes
- Registry website: nic.rip

.rip (Rest in peace) is a generic top-level domain (gTLD) in ICANN's New gTLD Program. It was launched and operated by Dog Beach, LLC.

== Usage ==
The intended use for the domain is to pay respects to people who have died, specifically for memorials, tributes, and deathcare services.

== History ==
.rip was delegated in the DNS root zone on 10 October 2014 from the company United TLD Holdco Ltd. The domain was later transferred to Dog Beach, LLC on 2 June 2021.
