= .pro =

Internet top-level domain

pro
- Introduced: 23 June 2004; 22 years ago
- TLD type: Generic top-level domain
- Status: Active
- Registry: Identity Digital
- Sponsor: None
- Intended use: Business use by qualified professionals
- Actual use: Internet & information technology professionals, consultants, real estate professionals, financial and accounting professionals, engineers, lawyers, communications professionals, medical professionals
- Registration restrictions: unrestricted to all registrants starting 16 November 2015
- Structure: Second level .PRO domains are available to all government certified individuals and businesses
- Documents: ICANN registry agreement
- Dispute policies: UDRP, Qualification Challenge Policy (QCP)
- Registry website: www.identity.digital

.pro is a generic top-level domain in the Domain Name System of the Internet. Its name is derived from professional, indicating its intended use by certified professionals.

== History ==
In October 2000 Jason Drummond came up with the concept for a new top level domain name (TLD) and established RegistryPro to jointly bid with Register.com for .pro. In May 2002 RegistryPro signed its contract with the Internet Corporation for Assigned Names and Numbers (ICANN), the organization that administers global domain names, under which it will operate the registry for the new top level domain (TLD) .pro.

The domain was originally launched in June 2004 with registrations restricted to four professions: accountants, engineers, lawyers and medical professionals in Canada, Germany, the United Kingdom and the United States.

In March 2005, the registrar EnCirca introduced its controversial ProForwarding service which enabled unverified people and businesses to register pro domains. Registrants then had thirty days to provide verified credentials prior to their domain being activated. Total registrations reached 6,899 by January 2008.

Following consultation with ICANN, the domain was relaunched in September 2008 with a wider remit to include government certified professionals in all countries. Registrants are required to self-certify their professional status and agree to terms of use before registration, then subsequently provide detailed license information.

In 2012, RegistryPro was acquired by Afilias Limited.

== Registrations ==
The official domain website describes the eligibility criteria as follows:

- Applicant provides professional services
- Applicant is admitted to or licensed by a government certification body or jurisdictional licensing entity recognized by a governmental body that regularly verifies the accuracy of its data.
- Applicant is in good standing.

The domain registry allows registration of third-level domains in the following domains:

- Legal: law.pro, avocat.pro, bar.pro, jur.pro, recht.pro
- Accountancy: cpa.pro, aaa.pro, aca.pro, acct.pro
- Medical: med.pro
- Engineering: eng.pro

As of April 2011, the domains may be registered through 44 accredited domain registrars. In January 2011, the number of registered domains surpassed 100,000. As reported in April 2010, the majority of domains are registered in the United States (42%), followed by France (24%) and the Russian Federation (5%).

A regulatory change made the .pro domain name unrestricted to all registrants starting 16 November 2015.

== See also ==
- Top-level domain
- Domain name
