= Paul Cain =

Paul Cain may refer to:

- Paul Cain (minister) (1929–2019), Pentecostal Christian minister
- Paul Cain (pen name) (1902–1966), American author of pulp fiction

== See also ==
- Paul Kane (disambiguation)
