= .io games =

Browser game genre

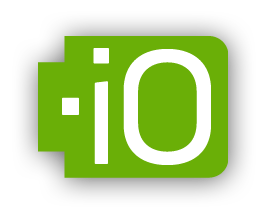
.io domain logo

.io games are a genre of browser-based multiplayer games that are often characterized by the use of the .io top-level domain name.

Starting in mid-2016, soon after the popularity spikes of Agar.io and Slither.io, more games in the .io games genre began to be released. Many of these games were simple clones of popular games, usually released in a top down-format.

== History ==
=== 2015–2016: Surge in popularity, Agar.io and Slither.io ===
Agar.io was announced on 4chan on 27 April 2015 by Matheus Valadares, a then 19-year-old Brazilian developer. In the game, players control one or more circular cells in a large map with many players, representing a Petri dish. The goal is to gain as much mass as possible by eating cells and player cells smaller than the player's cell while avoiding larger ones which can eat the player's cells. The game went viral on the free online games site Miniclip, and birthed a wave of new .io titles from around 2016—a new genre of large scale, arena based browser games.

Slither.io, a free for all multiplayer game in the Snake genre was created in 2016 by Steven Howse, a self-taught independent developer who was inspired by Agar.io. The game would gain traction in the years following. The basic premise of the game is that 50 players compete to eat colored orbs and grow as large as possible, while destroying other player's snakes.

=== 2016–2020: Expansion ===
In mid-2016, more games under the domain were released. Most were simple clones of popular games, released in a top down-format. Diep.io, another game by Matheus Valadares, was largely successful as well.

Other notable games from this period include ZombsRoyale.io, Mope.io, Surviv.io, Shellshock.io, Paper.io, Deeeep.io, Hole.io, Snake.io, and Florr.io.

.io games became popular during the peak of the COVID-19 pandemic from 2020 to 2021, because of their easy accessibility on the web.

=== 2021–present: Decline ===
After 2021, the popularity of .io games had generally declined due to the lack of updates and the rise of traditional mobile and video gaming; most .io games made the switch to mobile gaming due to its larger target audience.

Despite the general decline of .io games, Mope.io and Diep.io continued to receive development after both were acquired by 3AM Experiences from Addicting Games in 2024. In June 2026, Mope.io received a complete rewrite, replacing technology dating back to its original 2016 release, while Diep.io continues to be developed using its existing codebase. 3AM Experiences also organized in-person community events around its .io games, including MopeCon in 2024, the 3AM Expo in 2025, and Diep Con events in 2026.

=== 2026 - Ressurgence ===
Since the start of 2026, and even early 2025 the popularity of daily .io games has skyrocketed, e.g. Krillion, many more taking shape with inspiration from Krillion the game that revived the franchise.
