= .wtf =

Internet top-level domain

- Introduced: 23 April 2014
- TLD type: Generic
- Status: Active
- Registry: Identity Digital
- Intended use: creative projects; humor sites; meme pages
- Actual use: as intended; entities in Wunstorf
- Registered domains: ~4,350,000 pages (February 2022)
- DNSSEC: Yes

.wtf is a generic top-level domain (gTLD) run by Identity Digital, a gTLD registry. It is derived from the slang acronym "WTF".

In June 2012, Ryan Singel of Wired predicted no one would ever set up the .wtf domain, but later that month an application for the domain was submitted to Internet Corporation for Assigned Names and Numbers (ICANN), and although in August 2012 the Saudi Arabian government objected to .wtf and 30 other newly proposed top-level domains such as .gay, .bible and .islam, ICANN approved .wtf on 23 April 2014. Google indexed about 4,350,000 webpages with the .wtf domain.
