= .kaufen =

Internet top-level domain

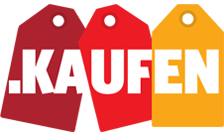
- Introduced: 29 December 2013
- Registry: Donuts
- Intended use: To establish an easily recognized and accessible namespace for businesses serving the German-speaking population
- Documents: ICANN registry agreement
- Dispute policies: UDRP
- Registry website: domains.kaufen

.kaufen is a top-level domain (TLD) in ICANN's New gTLD Program. The applicant is Demand Media (United TLD Holdco Ltd.). The proposed application succeeded and was delegated to the Root Zone on 29 December 2013.

== Purpose ==
The following is the official purpose of the .kaufen domain:

"The term "kaufen" is a generic and broadly used German word that holds particular affinity for people and organizations engaged in online commerce. In German, "kaufen" means "to buy". One mission and purpose of the .kaufen TLD is to establish an easily recognized and accessible namespace for the German-speaking portion of online commerce.

The .kaufen TLD is proposed by United TLD Holdco Ltd. ("United TLD"), a well-funded company established by highly experienced domain industry executives for the express purpose of securing the rights to operate a portfolio of TLDs that increase choice, expression, affinity and relevance for millions of consumers, businesses and other organizations on the web."

== ICANN contract ==
On 7 November 2013, Demand Media received a Registry Agreement signed by ICANN for .kaufen after passing all the required processes needed to become a Registry Operator for the string.

== Delegation and availability ==
.kaufen was delegated to the Root Zone of the DNS on December 29, 2013, completing the successful application for the string.
