= Name.com =

American internet services company

- Website type: Domain registry and API
- Founded: June 17, 2003; 23 years ago
- Headquarters: Denver, Colorado, United States
- Area served: Worldwide
- Owner: Identity Digital
- Founder: William Mushkin
- General manager: Sammy Ahmed
- Industry: Domain Registrar
- Products: Web Services
- Website: name.com

Name.com (stylized as name.com) is an ICANN accredited domain name registrar and web hosting company based in Denver, Colorado, and a subsidiary of Identity Digital. Since the 2003 inception, it offers registration in more than 600 top-level domains and had 2.7 million domains under management as of 2026. Additionally, the company provides a range of web products and services, such as DNS domains sales, web hosting, email services, SSL certificates, and an API for software providers to register domains for their users.

== History ==
Name.com was founded in 2003 by Bill Mushkin after Mushkin bought the company Spot Domain LLC (Domainsite.com) in 2002. NAME.COM LLC initially used multiple registrars for reselling, including domainsite.com, name.com, name.net, sunmounta.in, alohanic.com, briarwoodtechnologies.com, and domainregservices.com.

=== Acquisitions ===
On January 7, 2013, it was announced that Name.com was acquired by Demand Media for US$18,000,000 (equivalent to $24,878,571 in 2025).

Rightside Group, a spin-off company from Demand Media, became the parent company of Name.com in August 2014. Rightside also owned domain aftermarket service NameJet and domain registrar eNom, as well as operating a domain registry with 40 nTLDs. Rightside stock was publicly traded under the stock ticker NAME, inspired by their ownership of Name.com. On June 13, 2017, Rightside was acquired by Donuts Inc. in a transaction valued at $213 million. In a Merger Agreement approved unanimously by Rightside's Board of Directors, all of Rightside's assets, including Name.com, became part of Donuts Inc.

On June 22, 2022 Donuts Inc. rebranded to become Identity Digital.

=== Community involvement ===
Name.com hosted a hackathon called Hack the Dot, where developers, marketers, and creatives come together to create quick-fire projects within a two-hour timeframe based on a mystery domain name which is revealed at the time of the event. The company has partnered with Galvanize, Turing School of Software and Design, and a variety of other coding schools and coworking spaces in the past.

In 2016, Name.com partnered with Galvanize to offer free coding classes to interested students with a program called Learn to Code. These classes were offered over the course of a year in multiple cities across the U.S. including Denver, Boulder, San Francisco, Seattle, and Austin.

=== Support of net neutrality and internet free speech ===
In December 2011, when GoDaddy voiced its support for Stop Online Piracy Act (SOPA), Name.com was among several other anti-SOPA domain registrars that offered transfer discounts for anyone who wanted to move their domains to another provider.

When net neutrality came under review by the FCC in both 2014 and 2017, Name.com created educational videos and articles explaining to their customers why net neutrality was important and what individuals could do to protect it. During the July 12, 2017 Day of Action to raise awareness and support of net neutrality, Name.com posted a banner on the homepage of its website encouraging visitors to contact the FCC to voice their support for Title II.

=== Domain tasting allegation ===
In 2007, Name.com was accused of trademark infringement by Neiman Marcus and Bergdorf Goodman. The companies declared the domain registrars Name.com and Spot Domain had registered over 40 domains of various misspellings, such as NeimanMarco.com and BerdgorfGoodman.com. These domains failed to show accurate contact information or provided false details. In the complaint, which was filed in March 2007, in the US District Court in Denver, the high-end retailers sought damages of at least $100,000 per name.

Neiman Marcus and Bergdorf Goodman claimed that the registrars were taking advantage of their special status with the Internet Corporation for Assigned Names and Numbers (ICANN), to secure misspelled domains during the five-day grace period and paying only for the ones with valuable revenue. This practice called domain tasting, resulted in cybersquatting on various trademarked names. Neiman Marcus had accused the registrar Dotster in 2006 of the same infringement. Mushkin, however, denied the accusations of "domain tasting," explaining that Name.com and Spot Domain were merely registrars, caught in the crossfire. He also argued that "the industry is young," and the issues were not clear-cut. In the settlement, there were several stipulations imposed on the companies Name.com and Spot Domain. Mushkin declined to specify the agreement that was reached.

=== DNS hijacking ===
Reports of DNS hijacking by Name.com have appeared on the Internet as early as 2010. The registrar was not returning a NXDOMAIN status for DNS queries, and instead directed users to an advertising site they operated. When faced with criticism over this practice, the company pointed to a clause of their Domain Registration agreement that relates to "parked domain names," which is standard practice among registrars.

Name.com stopped the practice of DNS wildcarding in March 2013.

== Services ==
Name.com registers top-level domains (TLDs), including gTLDs, ccTLDs, nTLDs, and legacy domains, and offers an aftermarket domain brokerage.

Service products include web hosting, email through Google Workspace and Titan, SSL certificates, a website builder, WordPress installation and cloud hosting. Name.com also supports Two-Step Verification to help users add an extra layer of security to their user accounts.

=== API ===
The company maintains an application programming interface (API) for domain registration and management. In 2025, it was rebuilt according to OpenAPI specification with support for the Model Context Protocol, allowing AI agents to search for domains and register them. Their first official partner was the coding platform Replit. In December of the same year, name.com added integrations with Bolt, Netlify and Vercel to configure domains within those platforms.

== Bearglecorn mascot ==
Name.com's mascot is called "Bearglecorn", a mix of bear, eagle, and unicorn, which can be seen on the company's 404 page and in some marketing material. The word was coined by employee Jared Ewy and the original likeness was made by Owen Borseth using various images from the internet. Rightside filed a trademark on the Bearglecorn in early 2016, citing its first use in 2013.

== Philanthropy ==
=== Name.Gives ===
In November 2017, Name.com launched a philanthropy program called Name.Gives, funded by their parent company Donuts, Inc. Each quarter, Name.com employees have the opportunity to apply for funds to be donated to a charity or community organization they support. Organizations in the Denver-metro area that have been awarded financial contributions in the past include SafeHouse Denver, the Special Olympics Denver Swim Team, Metro Caring, Rangeview High School Track and Field, and the Northfield High School Solar Rollers.

=== Other community programs ===
The company has supported several non-profits, including a small literary magazine in South Africa, Amazwi, and a local environmental organization, Environment Colorado. Many of the charities featured are small, grassroots efforts, though Susan G. Komen and Electronic Frontier Foundation (EFF) are also listed on the company's sponsorship page.

The company previously had a bike-to-work incentive program that involved payback for a new bicycle. Though the project appears to be at a standstill, Name.com worked briefly on a system of maps for laptop.org, and offered to guide interns in their Denver office. In April 2008, Name.com sponsored Idealist.org for the Webby's People's Voice Awards, which was in turn sponsored by The Public Interest Registry, the registry behind the .org TLD. The event featured a panel of non-profits, including Greenpeace and Wikipedia.
