= .video =

Internet top-level domain

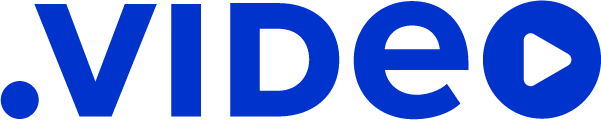
- Introduced: December 25, 2014; 11 years ago
- TLD type: gTLD
- Status: Delegated
- Registry: Identity Digital
- Intended use: Recorded, transmitted, or reproduced motion graphics
- Registration restrictions: None
- Structure: Direct second-level registrations will be allowed
- Dispute policies: UDRP, Charter Eligibility Dispute Resolution Procedure (CEDRP)
- Registry website: www.enom.com/

.video is a generic top-level domain in the Domain Name System of the Internet. Its name suggests the intended use by producers, bloggers, videographers to showcase pod-casts to broadcasts, reach out and create an instant recall value.

== See also ==
- .movie
- .tube
