= .global =

Internet top-level domain

- Introduced: May 29, 2014
- TLD type: Generic top-level domain
- Status: Active
- Registry: Identity Digital
- Intended use: Global entities
- Registration restrictions: None
- Registry website: NIC.global

.global is a generic top-level domain (gTLD) and was delegated to the DNS root zone on June 6, 2014. The application for the new top-level domain was approved on April 17, 2014, and .global was made available to the general public on September 9, 2014.

== Background ==
The path from application to launch was rather complicated, due to the name collision concerns relating to the word "global" (as it is being used in many internal networks). As a consequence, the .global registry had to block 60,000 domain names from registration for a couple of months, until the name collision issues had been fully resolved.
