= .sc =

Internet country code top-level domain for Seychelles

- Introduced: 9 May 1997
- TLD type: Country code top-level domain
- Status: Active
- Registry: VCS (Pty) Limited
- Sponsor: VCS (Pty) Limited
- Intended use: Entities connected with Seychelles
- Actual use: Used for a random assortment of sites, some related to Seychelles
- Registration restrictions: Priority given to Seychelles-based entities; varying restrictions for different third-level registrations
- Structure: Registrations are directly at second level or at third level beneath various second-level names
- Dispute policies: UDRP
- DNSSEC: yes
- Registry website: nic.sc

.sc is the Internet country code top-level domain (ccTLD) for Seychelles. The TLD was previously also marketed to businesses in Scotland and the U.S. state of South Carolina, although the domains are subject to Seychelles registry rules. While SCregistrars, a company which marketed .sc domains to a target audience of Scottish sites, has since closed down, the .sc extension remains available through the Afilias Global platform via various well-known registrars internationally for direct registration at second-level.

== Domain hacks ==
The domain has also been used for domain hacks, such as by the website SoundCloud (due to its initials "SC"). For example, "exit.sc" was a domain set up by SoundCloud for tracking traffic leaving its website.

== Third-level domains ==
- com.sc: commercial, for-profit organizations
- net.sc: network infrastructure machines and organizations
- edu.sc: educational institutions
- gov.sc: governmental institutions
- org.sc: miscellaneous, usually non-profit, organizations

== See also ==
- .scot – Internet top-level domain for Scotland
