= Ethos Capital =

American investment firm

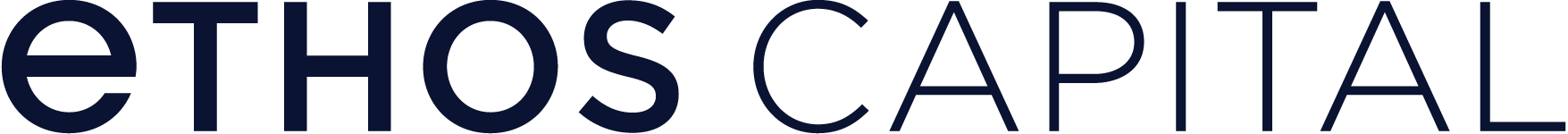
- Company type: Private
- Industry: Private equity
- Founded: 2019; 7 years ago
- Founder: Erik Brooks
- Headquarters: Boston, Massachusetts, U.S.
- Key people: Erik Brooks; Fadi Chehadé
- Website: ethoscapital.com

Ethos Capital is an American private equity investment firm founded in 2019 in Boston, Massachusetts, in order to make majority and control minority investments in middle-market companies, primarily across North America and Europe. It is best known for attempting and failing to gain control of the .org internet domain. Ethos Capital is the owner of Identity Digital, a top-level domain operator.

== History ==
In 2020, Ethos made news for trying to purchase the .org domain and capitalize upon it using a portfolio of data-monetization startups. After the takeover failed due to ICANN voting against the sale of the rights, company founders Erik Brooks and Fadi Chehadé went on to use the vehicle to buy domain name registrar Donuts and registry services provider Afilias from Abry Partners, where Brooks had been managing partner. In 2022, Afilias and Donuts were merged into a single company, Identity Digital.

=== Controversy ===
Most press coverage of Ethos has focused on allegations of insider dealing between former ICANN CEO Chehadé, who registered the domain name ethoscapital.org in May 2019, one day after price caps were lifted from the .org domain, and current employer Ethos Capital, and the unraveling of a complex web of interlocking control and ownership between domain name registries, registrars, and ICANN, which nominally regulates the domain name industry.
