= .accountants =

Top-level Internet domain

- Introduced: May 2, 2014; 12 years ago
- TLD type: Generic top-level domain
- Status: Active
- Sponsor: Binky Moon, LLC
- Registered domains: 1,595 (June 2026)
- Registration restrictions: Public registrations available
- DNSSEC: Yes
- Registry website: https://www.donuts.domains/

.accountants is a generic top-level domain (gTLD) in the Domain Name System of the internet. It was originally delegated to Knob Town, LLC, c/o Donuts LLC on 02 May 2014. On 23 March 2018, .accountants and 195 other domains were transferred to its current sponsor, Binky Moon, LLC, c/o Donuts LLC.
