= Paul Kane (entrepreneur) =

British businessman

Paul Kane is chief executive of the British technology firm CommunityDNS and from 2010 to 2017 was one of seven people entrusted with a credit card-like key to restart portions of the World Wide Web or internet which are secured with DNSSEC, after a catastrophic event such as a major security breach or terrorist attack. If such a situation arises, five keyholders will travel to the United States to meet up and restart the DNSSEC system.

Kane runs ICB, registrars for the controversial .io ccTLD.
