= Afilias =

American domain name registry

Afilias, Inc.
- Website type: Subsidiary
- Founded: October 2000
- Dissolved: June 2022
- Successor: Identity Digital
- Key people: Hal Lubsen, Ram Mohan, Roland LaPlante, Philipp Grabensee, Ken Stubbs, Jonathan Robinson, Steve Heflin, Scott Hemphill
- Industry: Web domain registration
- Parent: Donuts (since December 2020)
- Website: www.afilias.info

Afilias, Inc. was a US corporation that was the registry operator of the .info, .mobi and .pro top-level domain, service provider for registry operators of .org, .ngo, .lgbt, .asia, .aero, and a provider of domain name registry services for countries around the world, including .MN (Mongolia), .AG (Antigua and Barbuda), .AU (Australia), .BM (Bermuda), .BZ (Belize), .AC (Ascension Island), .GI (Gibraltar), .IO (British Indian Ocean Territory) .ME (Montenegro), .PR (Puerto Rico), .SC (the Seychelles), .SH (Saint Helena), and .VC (St. Vincent and the Grenadines). Afilias also provided ancillary support to other domains, including .SG (Singapore), .LA (Laos), and .HN (Honduras). It was merged into Identity Digital in 2022.

== History ==
Afilias was formed in October 2000 by a group of 19 major domain name registrars. CEO Hal Lubsen, CTO Ram Mohan, and CMO Roland LaPlante were the founding management team (2001).

In February 2010, Afilias acquired mTLD Top Level Domain Ltd., the sponsoring organization and registry operator for the .mobi top-level domain (known publicly as dotMobi). While dotMobi continues to operate as a wholly owned subsidiary, Afilias is now the registered Registry Operator for the .mobi domain.

In December 2012, Afilias acquired registryPro, the sponsoring organization and registry operator for the .pro top-level domain. While RegistryPro continues to operate as a wholly owned subsidiary, Afilias is now the registered Registry Operator for the .pro domain.

In October 2015, Afilias acquired domain name registrar 101domain, with the registrar's CEO Wolfgang Reile stepping down and its COO and CFO Anthony M. Beltran leading operations under Afilias.

In December 2017, Afilias was chosen by auDA to supply .au registry services. Afilias opened its Melbourne Australia branch to do this. Under Ram Mohan's leadership, Afilias successfully completed the historic transition on July 1, 2018, setting the Guinness World Records title for largest migration of an internet top-level domain in a single transition following its transfer of 3,153,979 .au domain names on Sunday, July 1, 2018.

In November 2020, it was announced that Afilias was acquired by Donuts, the domain name registry operator. In 2022, Afilias and Donuts were merged and brought under a single company, Identity Digital.

Afilias was headquartered in Horsham, Pennsylvania, United States, with engineering and operations offices in Toronto, Canada, Dublin, Ireland, Beijing, China, Melbourne, Australia and New Delhi, India.

== List of Afilias-operated domains ==
| Domain | Owned or operated? | WHOIS creation date |
|---|---|---|
| .adult | operated | |
| .aero | operated | |
| .ag | operated | |
| .archi | owned | 2014-03-20 |
| .asia | operated | |
| .au | operated | |
| .bet | owned | 2015-07-16 |
| .bio | owned | 2014-05-15 |
| .black | owned | 2014-03-20 |
| .blue | owned | 2014-01-23 |
| .bz | operated | |
| .gi | operated | |
| .global | operated | |
| .green | owned | 2014-06-12 |
| .info | owned | 2001-06-26 |
| .kim | owned | 2013-12-19 |
| .lc | operated | |
| .lgbt | owned | 2014-06-26 |
| .llc | owned | 2018-02-16 |
| .lotto | owned | 2014-06-05 |
| .ltda | operated | |
| .me | operated | |
| .mobi | owned | 2005-10-17 |
| .ngo | operated | |
| .ong | operated | |
| .onl | operated | |
| .org | operated | |
| .organic | owned | 2014-05-29 |
| .pet | owned | 2015-07-16 |
| .pink | owned | 2013-12-19 |
| .poker | owned | 2014-09-04 |
| .porn | operated | |
| .post | operated | |
| .pr | operated | |
| .pro | owned | 2002-05-08 |
| .promo | owned | 2015-12-18 |
| .red | owned | 2014-01-16 |
| .rich | operated | |
| .sc | operated | |
| .sex | operated | |
| .shiksha | owned | 2014-01-16 |
| .ski | owned | 2015-05-14 |
| .srl | operated | |
| .vc | operated | |
| .vegas | operated | |
| .vote | owned | 2014-02-13 |
| .voto | owned | 2014-02-13 |
| .xxx | operated | |

== Mobile and web services ==
- DeviceAtlas
- goMobi
- mobiForge
- mobiReady

== Awards and honors ==
- Guinness World Record for largest ever TLD transition, July 2018
- CIO 100 Award for the highest level of operational and strategic excellence in information technology (IT), June 2014
- Ram Mohan - IDG World's Top 25 CTOs, June 2010

== See also ==
- auDA
- Country code top-level domain
- Generic top-level domain
- ICANN
- Internet Society
- Public Interest Registry
