= .app (top-level domain) =

Internet top-level domain

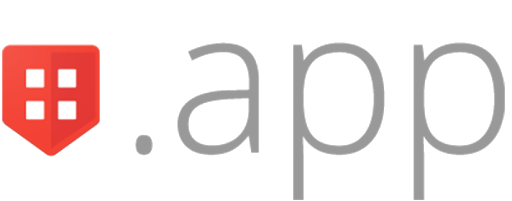
- Introduced: June 2015 (registered); May 2018 (public availability)
- TLD type: Generic top-level domain (gTLD)
- Status: Active
- Registry: Google Registry
- Intended use: Application branding, etc
- Registered domains: 750,803 (4 July 2024)
- Documents: ICANN registry agreement
- DNSSEC: Yes
- Registry website: get.app

.app is a generic top-level domain (gTLD) in ICANN's New gTLD Program. Google purchased the gTLD in an ICANN Auction of Last Resort in February 2015.

The TLD is of interest due to its utility in regards to branding mobile, web, and other applications.

== History ==
The development of the .app domain name began in 2012 after ICANN announced its "New gTLD Program". The program's goal is to expand the current variety of namespaces by an almost unlimited quantity of new entries. In January 2012 the program received its first applications and in 2013 first serious investment inflow. The first part of the program's domain names were released in late 2014.

On 25 February 2015, Google won the ICANN Auction of Last Resort for the .app gTLD, via their Charleston Road Registry Inc. company, paying US$25 million. Google opened public registration of the domain in May 2018.

== Use and purpose ==
The name "app" is a short form of the word application often used in the IT sector. This domain name is to be used by developer companies, professionals and enthusiast developers and entrepreneurs applications, app-support services or other useful related products and tools.

Because of its potential for use as a domain name space for mobile, web, and other applications—as well as for related products—the .app domain name creation is of interest to many development companies, professionals or enthusiast developers. The .app gTLD would allow users to easily recognize a Web site dedicated to an application or related product or service, which has benefits in terms of brandability.

.app domains are, according to Gandi.net and other Resellers, "a security-focused space, meaning that HTTPS is required for all websites." This is accomplished by including the .app top-level domain on the HSTS preload list, making HTTPS required on all connections to .app websites.

== See also ==
- List of Internet top-level domains
- Generic top-level domain
- Sponsored top-level domain
