= .ac =

Top-level Internet domain for Ascension Island

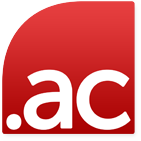
- Introduced: December 19, 1997; 28 years ago
- TLD type: Country code top-level domain
- Status: Active
- Registry: Ascension Island Network Information Centre (run by Internet Computer Bureau)
- Sponsor: Sure
- Intended use: Entities connected with Ascension Island
- Actual use: Various uses, sometimes connected to education and academia; a few sites actually on Ascension Island. Popular among websites related to Animal Crossing.
- Registration restrictions: 3rd level registrant must be resident on Ascension Island
- Structure: Registrations are taken directly at the second level or at third level beneath various 2nd-level labels
- Documents: Terms & Conditions; Rules
- Dispute policies: Dispute Resolution Policy
- DNSSEC: Yes
- Registry website: nic.ac

The .ac top-level domain is the Internet country code (ccTLD) for Saint Helena, Ascension and Tristan da Cunha, used primarily for Ascension Island (Saint Helena has its own ccTLD, .sh). It is administered by NIC.AC, a subsidiary of the Afilias-owned company Internet Computer Bureau.

Registration for the domain is open to anyone. The registry accepts registrations of internationalised domain names.

== See also ==
- .uk
- .sh
- .ac (second-level domain)
