= .dev =

Internet top-level domain for software developers

- Introduced: 2014 (registered); 2019 (public availability)
- TLD type: Generic top-level domain (gTLD)
- Status: Active
- Registry: Charleston Road Registry Inc.
- Intended use: Software developers, web developers
- Actual use: Software engineers, development tools, software frameworks and libraries
- Registered domains: 351,269 (25 January 2023)
- Documents: ICANN registry agreement
- DNSSEC: Yes
- Registry website: get.dev

.dev is a top-level domain name operated by Google Registry. It was proposed in ICANN's new generic top-level domain (gTLD) program, and became available to the general public on March 1, 2019, with an early access period that began on February 19.

== Security ==
The .dev top-level domain is incorporated on the HSTS preload list, requiring HTTPS on all .dev domains without individual HSTS enlistment.

== History ==
Prior to Google's addition of the .dev TLD to the HSTS preload list, it was common for web developers to create ad hoc addresses ending in .dev on their local networks for testing purposes. These local addresses would be created using either fake DNS servers or their own computer's hosts file and would not be accessible to the wider internet. However, after .dev was added to the HSTS preload list, most modern web browsers began refusing to load .dev websites unless they were served over secure HTTPS connections, thereby causing most of these local testing environments to stop functioning.

== See also ==
- List of Internet top-level domains
- Google Domains
