= Sunset (computing) =

Planned ending of a service or feature

In information technology (IT), to sunset a server, service, software feature, etc. is to plan to intentionally remove or discontinue it. In most cases, the term also connotes that this discontinuation is announced to users in advance, generally with an expected timeline. After sunsetting is announced, usually very few changes are made to the hardware or software in question, as such work would be counterproductive, when its termination is soon to follow. In some cases, however, individual features of an application, server, or service may be phased out at different times, leading up to the eventual full shutdown.
