= .lgbt =

Internet top-level domain for the LGBTQ community

- Introduced: 18 July 2014
- TLD type: Sponsored
- Status: Active
- Registry: Identity Digital
- Sponsor: Identity Digital
- Intended use: LGBTQ community
- Registered domains: 18,943 (14 December 2025)
- Dispute policies: UDRP
- DNSSEC: Yes

.lgbt is a sponsored top-level domain for the LGBTQ community, sponsored by Identity Digital. The domain name was delegated to the Root Zone on 18 July 2014. The creation of .lgbt is meant to promote diversity and LGBTQ businesses, and is open to LGBTQ businesses, organizations, and anyone wishing to reach the LGBTQ community.

== The first ==
PinkNews and Out Now Consulting were among the first to launch websites with .lgbt domains.
