= .sh =

Saint Helena, Ascension and Tristan da Cunha Internet domain

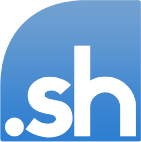
- Introduced: 23 September 1997
- TLD type: Country code top-level domain
- Status: Active
- Registry: NIC.SH (run by Internet Computer Bureau)
- Sponsor: Government of Saint Helena
- Intended use: Entities connected with Saint Helena and Tristan da Cunha
- Actual use: Various uses; a few sites actually on Saint Helena but most elsewhere. Used for domain hacks in English and other languages, for places and regions that can be abbreviated with sh, and for some websites related to the Unix shell
- Registration restrictions: 2nd-level registrant must have a professional or academic qualification (apparently not actually enforced); 3rd-level registrant must be resident on Saint Helena
- Structure: Registrations are taken directly at the second level or the third level beneath various 2nd-level labels
- Documents: Terms & Conditions; Rules
- Dispute policies: Dispute Resolution Policy
- DNSSEC: yes
- Registry website: NIC.SH

.sh is the Internet country code top-level domain (ccTLD) for the British Overseas Territory of Saint Helena, Ascension and Tristan da Cunha, although it is primarily used in Saint Helena (Ascension Island has its own ccTLD, .ac). Registrations of internationalised domain names are also accepted.

== Second level domains ==
There are seven second level domains:

- co.sh – commercial entities
- com.sh – commercial entities
- org.sh – non-profit organisations
- gov.sh – government departments and agencies
- edu.sh – educational institutions
- net.sh – network service providers
- nom.sh – non-island Internet sites

== Other usage of the domain ==
A majority of sites under the .sh domain have nothing to do with Saint Helena, Ascension or Tristan da Cunha.

Members of DeviantArt are able to go to their "stash," a service where digital media can be uploaded, stored and published. The DeviantArt "stash" uses the .sh top level domain sta.sh.

Ian Hecox and Anthony Padilla use the smo.sh domain name to link to addresses on their website, smosh.com from their YouTube channel, Smosh.

Skillshare uses the domain hack skl.sh to redirect to their website.

Since the .sh filename extension is also used by Unix shell scripts, this domain has been used for websites about command-line interface programs such as Homebrew.

SH is the official abbreviation for the German federal state of Schleswig-Holstein and the .sh domain is used for sites like nah.sh, a public transportation site as well as the Verbraucherzentrale (verbraucherzentrale.sh), the SPD party (spd.sh) and for some subpages by the official Schleswig-Holstein government (e.g. wahlen.sh).

The rhythm game osu! uses the .ppy.sh domain, such as osu.ppy.sh or old.ppy.sh.

The main fork of the popular movie torrent freeware program Popcorn Time is hosted at a .sh domain.

== See also ==
- .uk
- .ac
