= Mobile 2.0 =

Mobile 2.0, refers to a perceived next generation of mobile internet services that leverage the social web, or what some call Web 2.0. The social web includes social networking sites and wikis that emphasize collaboration and sharing amongst users. Mobile Web 2.0, with an emphasis on the Web, refers to bringing Web 2.0 services to the mobile internet, i.e., accessing aspects of Web 2.0 sites from mobile web browsers.

By contrast, Mobile 2.0 refers to services that integrate the social web with the core aspects of mobility – personal, localized, always-on, and ever-present. These services are appearing on wireless devices such as Smartphones and multimedia feature phones that are capable of delivering rich, interactive services as well as being able to provide access and to the full range of mobile consumer touch points including talking, texting, capturing, sending, listening, and viewing.

Enablers of Mobile 2.0

- Ubiquitous Mobile Broadband Access
- Affordable, unrestricted access to enabling software platforms, tools, and technologies
- Open access, with frictionless distribution and monetization

Characteristics of Mobile 2.0

- The social web meets mobility
- Extensive use of User-Generated Content, so that the site is owned by its contributors
- Leveraging services on the web via mashups
- Fully leveraging the mobile device, the mobile context, and delivering a rich mobile user experience
- Personal, Local, Always-on, Ever-present

The largest mobile telecoms body, the GSM Association, representing companies serving over 2 billion users, is backing a project called Telco 2.0, designed to drive this area.
