= Agar.io =

2015 video game

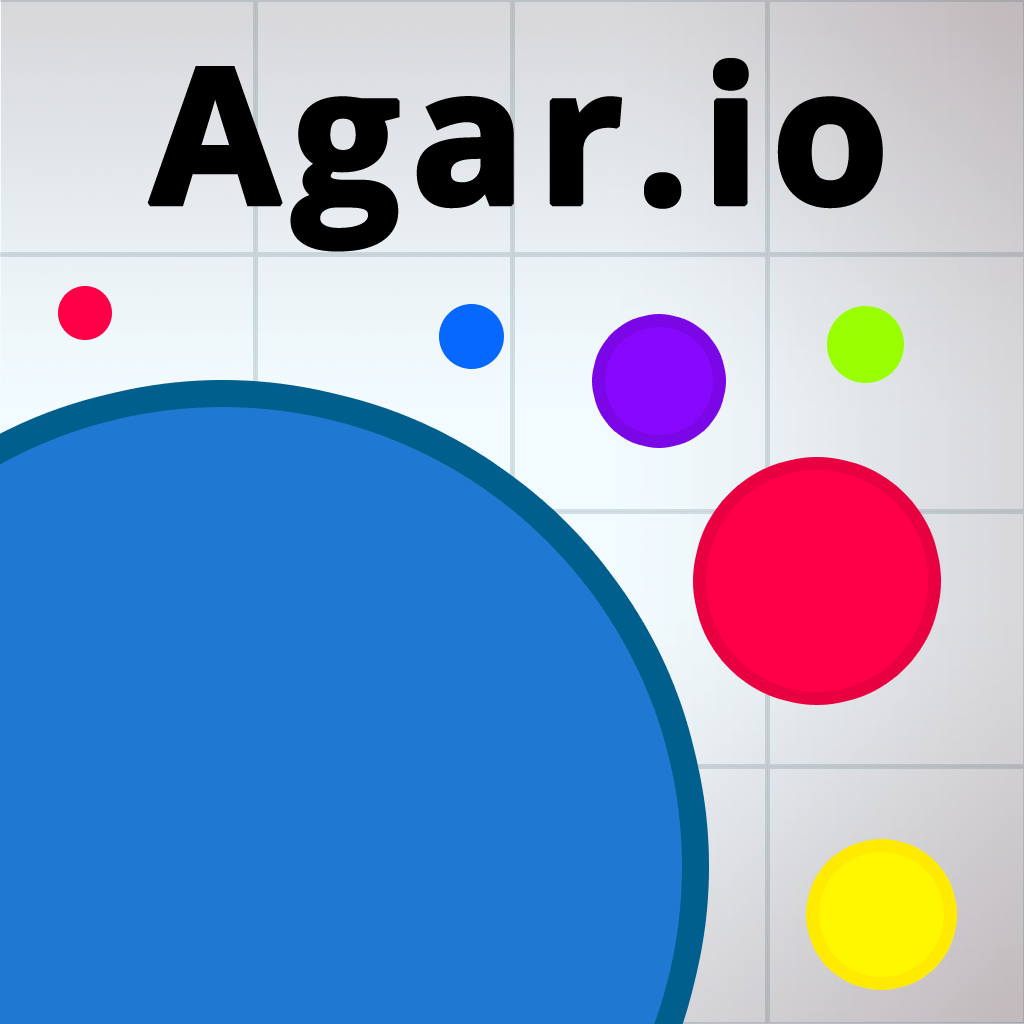
- Logo
- Publisher: Miniclip
- Designer: Matheus Valadares
- Platforms: Browser, Android, iOS, iPadOS
- Release: Browser; 28 April 2015; Android; 7 July 2015 iOS, iPadOS; 8 July 2015
- Genre: Casual
- Mode: Multiplayer

Agar.io (Note: Sometimes called or pronounced "agario" (/ˈeɪ.ɡɑːr.iː.oʊ, ˈɑː.-/)) is a massively multiplayer online game created by Brazilian developer Matheus Valadares and published by Miniclip. Players control one or more circular cells in a map representing a Petri dish. The goal is to gain as much mass as possible by eating cells and player cells smaller than the player's cell while avoiding larger ones which can eat the player's cells. Each player starts with one cell, but players can split a cell into two once it reaches a sufficient mass, allowing them to control multiple cells. The name comes from the substance agar, used to culture bacteria.

The game received positive critical reception; critics particularly praised its simplicity, competition, and mechanics, while criticism was directed at its repetitive gameplay. Largely due to word of mouth on social networks, it was a quick success, becoming one of the most popular browser and mobile games in its first year. The mobile version of Agar.io for Android was released on 7 July 2015 and iOS on 8 July 2015 by Miniclip. Agar.io has inspired similar web games called ".io games", including games with a similar objective but different characters, and games that incorporate elements of other genres like shooter games.

== Gameplay ==
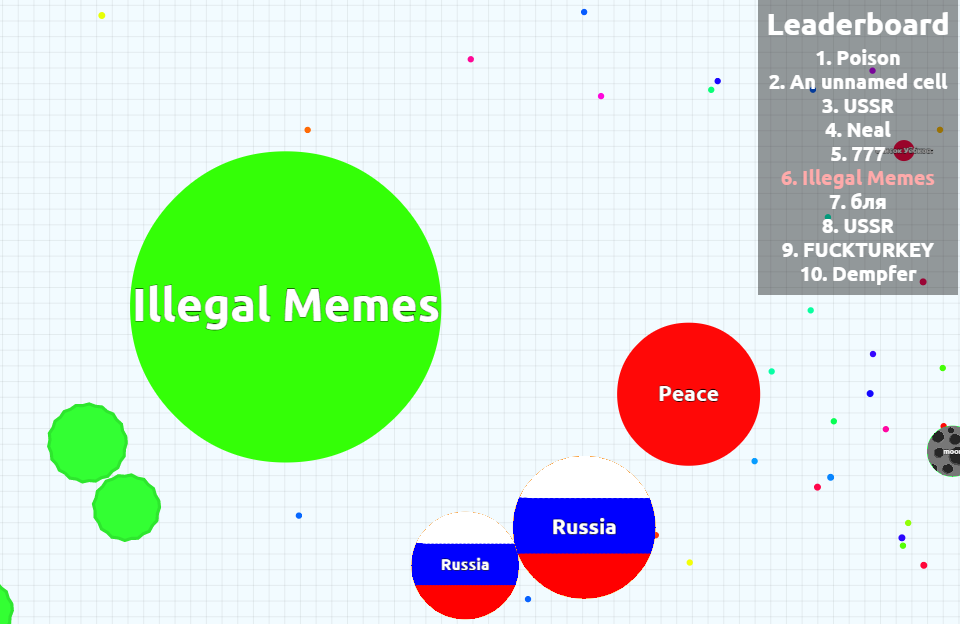
Gameplay screenshot

The objective of Agar.io is to grow a cell on a Petri dish by swallowing both randomly generated cells, known as "agar", which slightly increases a cell's mass, and other smaller cells (players), without being swallowed by even larger cells. The browser version currently holds five game modes: FFA (Free-For-All), Battle Royale, Teams, Experimental, and Party. The mobile version of the game includes Classic (like FFA), Battle Royale, Rush Mode Burst, and Relax (a game mode in which all of the other players are video game bots that progressively increase in size). The goal of the game is to obtain the largest cell; players must restart from a small cell when all their cells are eaten by larger players or fountain viruses. Players can change their cell's appearance with predefined words, phrases, symbols, or skins. The more mass a cell has, the more slowly it will move. Cells will gradually lose a small amount of mass over time.

Viruses are green, spiky circles that split cells that consume them into many smaller cells, rendering them vulnerable and attractive targets to other players. Players can hide under viruses if their cell is small enough and their name short enough. Viruses are normally randomly generated, but players can also cause viruses to split in two by "feeding" them mass—typically in the direction of another nearby cell which the player wants to consume. Consuming a virus will change your mass by +100 and red viruses change your mass by +200.

Red viruses look similar to regular ones, except for their color. They will consume/eat cells that have less than 200 mass, spitting out their mass equivalent in food/dots. When a green virus is fed to a red one, the red virus will consume it, spitting out the equivalent mass. Cells with mass greater than 200 can swallow the red virus, which achieves the same effect as a regular virus, but the player will be rewarded with 200 mass instead of the regular 100, and red viruses only spawn in Experimental and Battle Royale mode.

In the experimental mode, feeding a virus will push it instead of enlarging it, making it easier to split other players.

Players can split their cell evenly into two (if the starting mass is odd, the cells’ masses will differ slightly), to a limit of 16 cells at once. One of the two evenly divided cells will be shot in the direction of the cursor when the space bar was pressed. This can be used as a ranged attack to shoot a cell in order to swallow other smaller cells or to escape an attack and move quickly around the map. Split cells merge back into one cell if a bigger cell of the same player consumes it. Aside from feeding viruses, players can release a small fraction of their mass to feed other cells, an action commonly recognized as an intention to team with another player.

== History ==
=== Development ===
Agar.io was created by nineteen-year-old Brazilian developer Matheus Valadares, written in JavaScript and C++. Valadares shared an IP address to the game for playtesting on the 4chan video game board /v/ and game development forums, before releasing it on the domain agar.io on 28 April 2015. It is named after agar, a substance used to grow cell cultures. Valadares continued to experiment with adding new features—experimental mode was created specifically for this purpose. He thought about adding more complex biological features like photosynthesis and mitochondria, but ultimately decided to strip the game down to its current simple mechanics. In-game advertisements covered server costs.

=== Popularity ===
Valadares never marketed Agar.io outside of his single post on 4chan, where he received feedback and users formed "cartels" to get on the in-game leaderboard. Its initial success is instead attributed to its popularity among online content creators such as YouTubers and Twitch streamers. Only a week later, the YouTube channel Vinesauce uploaded a gameplay video of Agar.io. On 30 May, PewDiePie, a YouTuber who then had over 42 million subscribers, uploaded the first of nine Agar.io videos and called it his "new favourite game". However, he stated in the video that his fans had been requesting an Agar.io video for a long period of time—it had already become popular via word-of-mouth across social media. (Note: Valadares had submitted the game through Steam Greenlight on May 3. Despite quickly receiving approval, Agar.io was never released on the Steam platform. Cameron Lindsey, writing in the journal Games and Culture, supposed this was because of its existing popularity as a browser game.) Dedicated Agar.io YouTubers saw their subscriber counts quickly rise.

Commentators also suggested Agar.io's accessibility as a free browser game, as well as the addictiveness of its simple and intuitive mechanics, as reasons for its unexpected success.

In March 2016, Agar.io videos reached two billion views on YouTube. Digital Trends said in 2021 that Agar.io still maintained an active core fanbase.

=== Mobile game ===
After meeting with him in Lisbon, mobile game publisher Miniclip began working with Valadares at the end of April 2015. They were attracted by Agar.io's wide appeal; the game already had five million daily players and Miniclip executive producer Jamie Cason stated that their staff were all playing it within a week. Miniclip released mobile ports of Agar.io on the App Store and Google Play on July 8. It became the number one app on the App Store in the United States, United Kingdom and 32 other countries.

== Reception ==
Agar.io was praised for the addictive nature of its simple gameplay and graphics. PC Gamer included it on its list of the best browser games.

Engadget described the game as "a good abstraction of the fierce survival-of-the-fittest competition that you sometimes see on the microscopic level." TouchArcade praised its simplicity, strategic element, and "personality". It was chosen by SFGATE as App of the Week in August 2015. Criticism was mainly targeted towards its repetitiveness and the controls of the mobile version. Tom Christiansen of Gamezebo was mixed on the game, saying that there was "nothing to hold my attention" and that it was "highly repetitive, overall". Pocket Gamer, reviewing the mobile version, described its controls as "floaty".

Game journalists also noticed that the ability to choose usernames and skins enabled players to declare their support for geopolitical causes and figures in-game. Some even formed alliances with players supporting the same causes. Others adopted internet memes and online platforms as their skins, as well as offensive usernames. One reviewer jokingly recounted: "I've ... seen the Earth be swallowed by Pubes, Steam absorb EA, and France split in two and flee from Mars before being eaten by Your Mom's Ass (which was, quite frankly, enormous)."

In the weeks leading up to the June 2015 Turkish general election, Kotaku noticed that players using names related to Turkish politics were prevalent and often cooperated against other political parties. An article in the journal Games and Culture argued that the feature was the main reason for Agar.io's success. It noted that Agar.io provided a platform for competing ideologies in a "survival of the fittest" simulation when they would instead be shut down on social media. In an effort to make the game more commercial, Miniclip improved moderation and removed the Swastika and ISIS skins, a move which was described as furthering the game from its original 4chan audience—Valadares himself had refused to remove the Nazi skin on Reddit.

Because it was frequently propagated through social media and broadcast on Twitch and YouTube, Agar.io was a quick success. The agar.io website (for the browser version) was ranked by Alexa as one of the 1,000 most visited websites and the mobile versions were downloaded more than ten million times during their first week, and 113 million times as of December 2016. During 2015, Agar.io was Google's most searched video game. It was Google's second-most searched game in the United States in 2016. A 2015 press release by Miniclip stated that Agar.io was listed as the fifth top game on YouTube's list of top games.

== Similar ".io" games ==
Inspired by Agar.io's success, Steven Howse released the snake-themed Slither.io in March 2016. The game soon reached the top 10 most downloaded apps on iOS and Android, buoyed by the similar word-of-mouth and attention from YouTubers that had propelled Agar.io. By June, Slither.io had hit over sixty million daily players. It eclipsed Agar.io's popularity, pushing it to second place to become the most Googled game of 2016. The rapid rise of Agar.io and Slither.io led to the beginning of a new genre of browser games, dubbed ".io games" for the domain name they use, .io. Characterized by simple graphics and gameplay in a free-for-all multiplayer arena, .io games received around 192 million visits in 2017. Many .io shooters launched after Slither.io—Valadares released Diep.io in July 2016. Miniclip also began developing new .io games.

The large number of such games led to the fragmentation of the user base, with too many games and not enough human players. This led to the implementation of video game bots within the servers of the game. Essentially, the purpose of the bots was to keep the lobbies full, which would increase the chances of having real players remain within the game. This raised ethical concerns, especially because game developers were not making clear that the players were competing against artificial intelligence within the game, damaging its social experience. This was not the case with Agar.io alone: Hole.io was also suspected of having bots within the arena. Players were able to prove this by turning off the internet during the middle of the game, and the game was able to continue without interruption.

== In popular culture ==
In the ninth episode of House of Cards season 4, Frank Underwood is seen playing Agar.io.
