= Identity Digital =

American domain name services company

Identity Digital Inc.
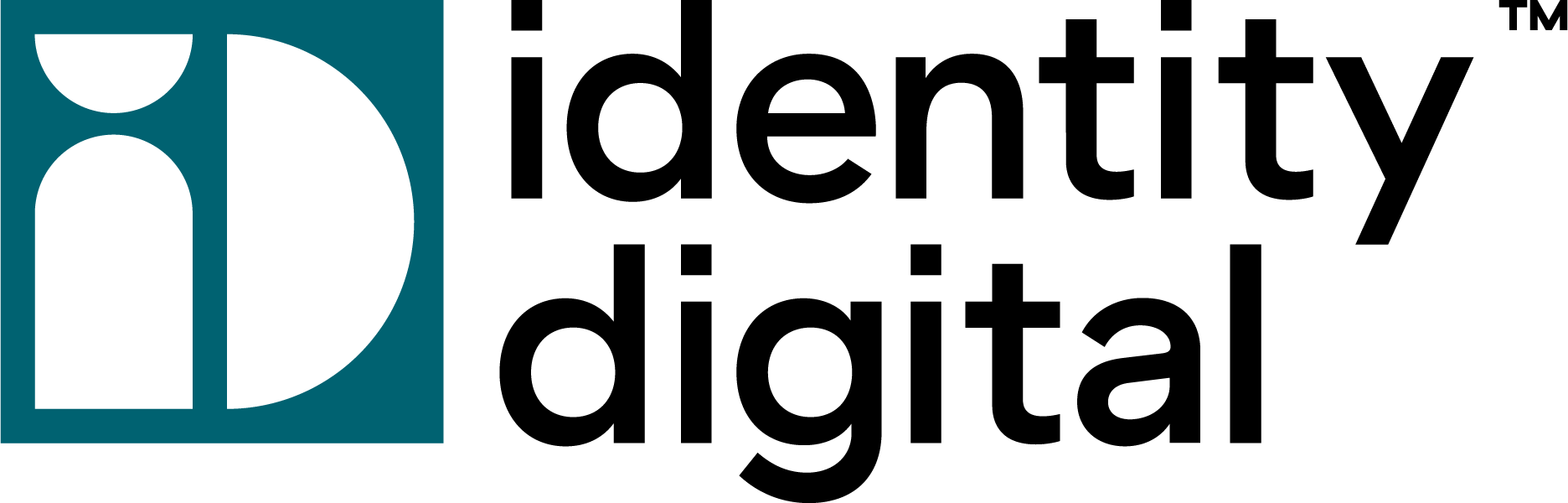
- Type: Private
- Industry: Domain name registry Domain name registrar
- Predecessor: Donuts
- Founded: 2010 (as Donuts); June 2022 (as Identity Digital)
- Headquarters: Bellevue, Washington, U.S.
- Key people: Akram Atallah, CEO
- Owner: Ethos Capital
- Website: identity.digital

Identity Digital Inc. is an American company with affiliated entities that operate in the domain name industry, including a domain name registrar and registry services provider. It is owned by the private equity firm Ethos Capital. The company acquired the registry operator and back-end registry services divisions of Afilias, Inc. in 2020. Both Donuts Inc. (the parent company) and Afilias Inc. were rebranded and brought under the single company brand name Identity Digital in 2022.

== Companies ==
=== Donuts Inc ===
Donuts Inc. was a parent company with affiliated entities that operated in the domain name industry, including a domain name registrar and registries, that provided paid domain names via its subsidiaries’ registry operator status (for example, managing the .social generic top-level domain) and contracts between its subsidiaries and other registries and registrars.

=== Afilias ===
Afilias was founded in October 2000 by a group of 19 major domain name registrars. In November 2020, Afilias was acquired by the domain name registry operator Donuts.

== Managed top level domains ==
Identity Digital / Donuts is either the ICANN-approved sponsor organization or owns controlling interest in the ICANN-approved sponsor organization for 271 top-level domains (TLDs), approximately 42% of all generic TLDs. (Note: Many of these TLDs are operated under a different business name, which are subsidiaries of Identity Digital. As of January 2026, there are 638 generic TLDs in total (546 English, 44 non-English, 48 internationalized; from List of Internet top-level domains).)

=== Business ===
- .limited
- .ltd
- .management
- .network
- .partners
- .sarl (company with limited liability, French (or Portuguese) legal entity) (France) (Portugal)
- .services
- .solutions
- .ventures
- .support
- .associates
- .business
- .careers
- .center
- .consulting
- .company
- .enterprises
- .gmbh (company with limited liability, German legal entity) (Germany)
- .group
- .industries
- .international
- .企业 (enterprise) (China)

=== Education ===
- .academy
- .church
- .education
- .institute
- .mba
- .school
- .schule (school) (Germany)
- .university
- .degree

=== Entertainment ===
- .bingo
- .bet
- .casino
- .dating
- .dog
- .events
- .games
- .movie
- .lotto
- .show
- .singles
- .theater
- .actor
- .band
- .dance
- .live
- .poker
- .rocks
- .studio
- .video
- .游戏 (games) (China)
- .娱乐 (entertainment) (China)

=== Financial ===
- .accountants
- .capital
- .cash
- .claims
- .credit
- .creditcard
- .estate
- .exchange
- .finance
- .financial
- .fund
- .global
- .holdings
- .insure
- .investments
- .llc
- .loans
- .money
- .report
- .tax

=== Fun Domains ===
- .cool
- .exposed
- .fail
- .black
- .red
- .gripe
- .jetzt (now in German) (Germany)
- .ninja
- .blue
- .pink
- .wtf (WTF means usually "what the fuck" in internet slang)
- .life
- .green
- .pet

=== Healthcare ===
- .care
- .clinic
- .dental
- .dentist
- .doctor
- .healthcare
- .hospital
- .rehab
- .rip
- .surgery
- .vet
- .vision

=== Home and Construction ===
- .plumbing
- .lighting
- .repair
- .tools
- .cleaning
- .builders
- .construction
- .contractors
- .works
- .glass
- .parts
- .pro
- .supplies
- .supply
- .tires

=== Legal ===
- .legal
- .attorney
- .lawyer

=== News and Information ===
- .bio
- .chat
- .directory
- .fyi (for your information)
- .info
- .memorial
- .tips
- .reviews
- .news
- .media
- .today

=== Photography ===
- .camera
- .equipment
- .gallery
- .graphics
- .photography
- .photos
- .pictures

=== Political and Military ===
- .democrat
- .republican
- .vote
- .army
- .airforce
- .voto
- .navy
- .family

=== Real Estate ===
- .apartments
- .camp
- .community
- .condos
- .farm
- .house
- .immo
- .land
- .lease
- .maison
- .properties
- .rentals
- .villas
- .haus (house) (Germany)
- .mortgage
- .immobilien (property) (Germany)

=== Sports and Fitness ===
- .bike
- .coach
- .football
- .golf
- .hockey
- .pro
- .run
- .soccer
- .team
- .tennis
- .training
- .ski
- .futbol
- .rocks
- .expert
- .guru
- .fan
- .fitness

=== Style and Fashion ===
- .boutique
- .clothing
- .diamonds
- .florist
- .furniture
- .gold
- .jewelry
- .salon
- .shoes
- .style
- .toys
- .watch
- .moda (people/organizations interested in fashion and style)

=== Technology ===
- .codes
- .computer
- .domains
- .systems
- .technology
- .engineer
- .engineering
- .energy
- .mobi
- .solar
- .software
- .网站 (web) (China)
- .移动 (mobile) (China)

=== Travel and Geography ===
- .travel
- .city
- .cruises
- .flights
- .guide
- .holiday
- .asia
- .irish
- .place
- .reise (travel) (Germany)
- .viajes (trip) (Spain)
- .tours
- .town
- .vacations
- .reisen (travel, plural or verb) (Germany)
- .voyage
- .cab
- .limo
- .zone
- .world
- .taxi

=== Shopping and Retail ===
- .bargains
- .cards
- .cheap
- .coupons
- .deals
- .delivery
- .direct
- .discount
- .express
- .gifts
- .gratis (free) (Germany)
- .plus
- .shopping
- .tienda (store) (Spain)
- .sale
- .promo
- .kaufen (buy) (Germany)
- .market
- .auction
- .forsale
- .商店 (shop/store) (China)

=== Food and Beverage ===
- .cafe
- .catering
- .coffee
- .kitchen
- .pizza
- .recipes
- .restaurant
- .vin (wine) (France)
- .wine
- .fish
- .pub

=== Marketing and Communications ===
- .agency
- .digital
- .email
- .marketing
- .media
- .productions
- .social
- .studio
