= Slither.io =

Browser/mobile game

slither.io
- Developer: Steve Howse
- Platforms: Browser, iOS, Android
- Release: Browser, iOS; March 25, 2016; Android; March 27, 2016
- Genres: Casual, snake
- Modes: Multiplayer, single-player

Slither.io (Note: It is sometimes called or pronounced "slitherio" (/ˈslɪ.ðər.iː.oʊ/) and "slither".) (stylized as slither.io) is a multiplayer online video game available for iOS, Android, and web browsers, developed by Steve Howse. Players control an avatar resembling a snake, which consumes multi-colored pellets, both from other players and ones that naturally spawn on the map in the game, to grow in size. The objective of the game is to grow the longest snake in the server. Slither.io is similar in concept to the popular 2015 web game Agar.io and is reminiscent of the classic arcade game Snake.

The game grew in popularity following its promotion among several prominent YouTubers such as PewDiePie, Markiplier, Jacksepticeye, DanTDM, Fernanfloo and JuegaGerman, topped the App Store soon after its release. Slither.io's browser version was ranked by Alexa as one of the 1,000 most visited sites in July 2016, while the iOS version ranked first in the most downloaded apps on the App Store. A mobile version of the game for Android was released on March 27, 2016. The reception of the game was positive, with reviewers praising its appearance and customization but criticizing it for its low replay value and the high price users were required to pay to remove advertisements (although as of 2026, most versions of the game no longer show them).

== Gameplay ==
An example of Slither.io gameplay, showing one player's snake eating the remains of another snake that has died. This is only a part of the map.

The objective of the game is to control a snake, also known as "slithers", around a wide area and eat pellets, defeating and consuming other players to gain mass to grow the largest and longest in the game. Once players are spawned into the virtual world, their avatar remains in constant motion. If the player's snake's head collides with another slither's body, the player will die. The defeated avatar's body turns into bright, larger shining pellets for other players to consume. These pellets that remain from "death" of an avatar will correspond to the color of the avatar itself, and are both brighter and bigger than "normal" pellets, which spawn naturally throughout the world. Normal pellets do not give as much mass as pellets dropped from other snakes. "Chase" pellets will appear individually in various places of the world and can be obtained by boosting; when eaten, they give a greater amount of mass than pellets dropped by other snakes. Chase pellets avoid snakes and flee when they draw near.

By pressing and holding the space bar, up arrow, or left/right mouse button, or double-tapping the touch screen on mobile, the player can use their boost, which causes the avatar to speed up using mass. When the button is released, or the finger on the touchscreen on mobile, the snake will stop using its boost. The mass that is lost from the boost appears as a line of small pellets where the boost was used. The mass lost can be regained by consuming the pellets. Similar to pellets dropped from defeated avatars, the boost pellets correspond to the color of the avatar. The boost feature is useful to outmaneuver and defeat opponents. A common strategy is coiling the player's snake around a smaller opponent's in a loop, until the opponent, trapped in the tightening loop, crashes into the player.

There is a border that confines avatars within the circular game board. If a snake hits the border, the player automatically dies without turning into pellets. On each server, leaderboards are displayed at the top right, showing the top ten players with snakes that have the most mass out of all the other snakes in the entire server.

On the mobile versions of the game, there is a "play versus AI" mode where all the other snakes are computer opponents. These players also appear in normal servers, to a lesser extent. Their names consist of various preset ones followed by "(bot)". There are various other differences between standard and AI matches, including player speed (faster in AI matches), skins of computer players (only solid colors in normal matches vs any default skin in AI matches), and as of January 2026, there are 66 default skins to choose from, consisting of various solid colors and patterns as well as ones designed after national flags and YouTubers. If a skin is not chosen, the player will be assigned a randomly chosen solid colored skin each time they join a server. (Note: The default colors are orange, yellow, purple. lavender, teal, green, chartreuse, brick, pink, red, and white.) The player may also choose to create their own skin, with a tool known as "Build a Slither", which shows the different colors that an avatar can be made of, that can be placed on the snake upon clicking. Previously, in order to unlock custom skins in browser mode, players were forced to share the game on Twitter or Facebook using the external links found on the website. By June 2016, the ability to add skins was also added to the iOS and Android versions. There are also 32 cosmetics and 19 map backgrounds to choose from. Players can choose their own name to be shown underneath the snake's head and on the leaderboard, up to 24 characters. This system has been criticized for flaws in its moderation.

== Development ==
According to game creator Steven Howse, he was inspired to create the game while he was experiencing financial problems. As a result of these financial issues, he had to move from Minneapolis to Michigan, where he realized the popularity of Agar.io. He had long wanted to create an online multiplayer game, however Adobe Flash was the only development option at the time, and not wanting to use this method, he paused the idea for a while. Howse finally created the game when he realized that WebSocket, a low-latency protocol supported by most major browsers, was sufficient and stable enough to run an HTML game similar to other games such as Agar.io. The most difficult part of the development was in making each server stable enough to handle 600 players at a time. Howse struggled to find space on servers with enough space in regions where there was more demand and tried to avoid cloud services like Amazon Web Services, owing to the high cost that these services would incur based on the amount of bandwidth used.

After six months of development, Slither.io was released for browsers and iOS on March 25, 2016, with servers supporting up to 500 players. Two days after the iOS/browser versions' release, an Android version was made available by Lowtech Studios. The only way Howse could make revenue was to display advertising in the app after the player's snake died; this option could be removed for US$3.99. He chose not to sell virtual currency or power-ups so that those who paid would not have an advantage over players who did not. As there was no money to advertise for the game, the only way to promote the game was the various let's plays by players on YouTube, including PewDiePie, who had more than 47 million subscribers at the time. The success of the game would cause Raw Thrills to develop an arcade version a few years later.

In the weeks following the release, Howse worked on updates to stabilize the game and provide a better experience for players. In addition, he planned to add new features, such as a "friendly mode" that allows people to set up teams, and a way for the player to choose a server to play on. As of December 2025, the latter has been added to the game. Howse said that two major gaming companies had approached him to buy Slither.io. He had considered the idea, since he felt that it was stressful to maintain the game.

== Reception ==
Soon after release, Slither.io reached the top of the App Store sales charts in the free software category in several regions, including the United States and the United Kingdom. By the end of 2016, Slither.io had become Google's most searched video game of the year in the United States.

Patricia Hernandez of Kotaku said that the game's low barriers to entry and similarity to Agar.io explained Slither.io's popularity. She noted the game's fast pace. Boing Boing compared the game's core mechanic to that of the 2009 game Osmos. Brandt Ran, writing for Business Insider, said that "despite running into some technical hiccups—the game can lag heavily at times—I doubt Slither.io will be leaving my home screen anytime soon." Harry Slater, writing for Pocket Gamer, defined the game as "interesting", the gameplay as a "compulsive experience", and the structure as simple and similar to Agar.io, although it did not have a large replay value. TechCrunch's Felicia Williams praised the designs, getting "pleasantly surprised" with the variety of skins for customization. Lian Amaris of Gamezebo found the game to be "far more interesting than Agar.io" because it involved "an ever-growing languid body rather than just a flat circle", and praised "the dark environment with neon worms," which gave the game a "retro arcade feel." Amaris also compared the concept of Slither.io to that of Agar.io and stated that Slither.io was reminiscent of the classic arcade game Snake.

Shortly after the release of the mobile versions, the game was in first place in the ranking of games of the App Store. Despite Slither.io's popularity, it received mixed reviews. Scottie Rowland of Android Guys praised the gameplay and graphics but criticized the ads that pop up on the screen after the end of the game, calling them "extremely annoying", and finding the payment to remove them "a bit pricey".

=== Popularity ===
By July 2016, the browser version website was ranked by Alexa as the 250th most visited site worldwide, but then experienced a decline in popularity, dropping below 1,000 by October 2016 before remaining mostly constant at approximately 1,700 by January 2017. In April 2017, Slither.io's global rank then started declining further, reaching 2,800 by September 2017. By that same period, the game had already been downloaded more than 68 million times in mobile applications and played more than 67 million times in browsers, generating a daily income of US$100,000 for Howse.

=== Snake.io dispute ===
Snake.io is a clone of Slither.io available on web, mobile, and other platforms, including Netflix Games. Slither.io is suing Snake.io for trademark infringement due to the similarities in their logo. On X, Slither.io has openly criticized Snake.io, Netflix, and Google's Gemini AI for copying and spreading misinformation about Slither.io. Others have, in response, criticized Slither.io for its use of generative AI for its ingame backgrounds.

== See also ==
- Snaky Cat
- .io games
