= Donuts (company) =

American domain name registry

Donuts Inc.
- Website type: Private
- Founded: November 22, 2010
- Dissolved: June 22, 2022
- Successor: Identity Digital
- Headquarters: Bellevue, Washington, U.S.
- Key people: Akram Atallah, President and CEO
- Industry: Internet
- Website: donuts.domains at the Wayback Machine (archived 2016-02-19)

Donuts Inc. was a domain name registrar and registry providing paid domain names under 270 new generic top-level domains (gTLDs), as made possible by ICANN's gTLD expansion program, as well as 173 other TLDs including .au (ccTLD) and .org (gTLD managed by the Public Interest Registry), through its own registry status (for example, managing the .social gTLD) and contracts between its subsidiaries and other registries.

It was co-founded in 2010 by Paul Stahura, Jonathon Nevett, Richard Tindal, and Daniel Schindler. The company was headquartered in Bellevue, Washington.

In July 2017, Donuts acquired Rightside, along with domain registrar Name.com.

On August 11, 2018, Donuts entered into an agreement to be acquired by private equity firm Abry Partners.

In October 2018, Donuts named Akram Atallah as Chief Executive Officer.

In December 2020, Donuts acquired the registry division of Afilias, Inc., a registry, registrar and mobile software developer headquartered outside of Philadelphia, Pennsylvania.

In January 2021, Ethos Capital acquired Donuts after their failed bid to gain control over the .org internet domain.

In 2022, Afilias and Donuts Inc. were merged under Identity Digital.
