= .me =

Internet top level domain for Montenegro

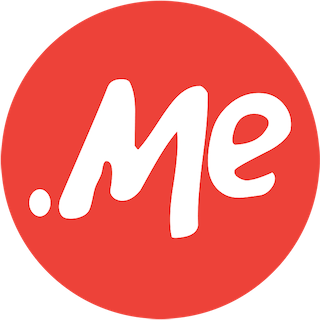
- Introduced: 24 September 2007
- TLD type: Country code top-level domain
- Status: Active
- Registry: domain.me (DoMEn d.o.o)
- Sponsor: Government of Montenegro
- Intended use: Entities connected with Montenegro
- Actual use: Positions itself for global use like a personal namespace; can be registered and used for any purpose. Used by businesses in Maine, the Middle East, and Montenegro and is popular for domain hacks.
- Registration restrictions: None
- Structure: Second-level registrations available worldwide; third-level registrations under certain second-level names available within Montenegro
- Documents: Policies
- Dispute policies: UDRP
- DNSSEC: Yes
- Registry website: domain.me

.me is the Internet country code top-level domain (ccTLD) for Montenegro.

The .me registry is operated by doMEn, which won a contract to do so after a bid process conducted by the government of Montenegro and was launched through various accredited registrars around the world.

Google treats .me as a generic top-level domain (gTLD) because "users and website owners frequently see [the domain] as being more generic than country-targeted."

== Introduction ==
Montenegro declared its independence from Serbia and Montenegro on 3 June 2006, after a majority of Montenegrins supported independence in a national referendum. As a part of that country, constituently, Montenegro had unofficially been using the .cg.yu second-level domain; Montenegrin Authorities used .mn.yu subdomain, while the .cs top-level domain (TLD) had been assigned to Serbia and Montenegro in 2003 following the breakup of Yugoslavia, but remained unused. Montenegro was assigned the ISO 3166-1 two-letter code "ME", which was allocated by the International Organization for Standardization (ISO) in September 2006 (most other possible abbreviations of Montenegro (MO, MN, MT, MG and MR) and its Montenegrin name Crna Gora (CG) having already been taken).

In September 2007, ICANN delegated the .me domain to the Government of Montenegro, with the former .yu domain to be operated temporarily by the .rs domain registry (Serbian National Register of Internet Domain Names) until its eventual abolition on or before 30 September 2009. Delegation of root name servers was approved by IANA, establishing .me. The ".me" domain became active on 24 September 2007, and a "Public Invitation for selection of the Agent for domain registration under the national Internet domain of Montenegro" was posted on 14 November. doMEn d.o.o., as a Montenegro-based joint venture whose partners are Afilias, GoDaddy.com, and ME-net d.o.o., was selected as the new registry operator.

On 6 May 2008, the General Sunrise period for the .me registry began for all eligible trademark holders worldwide, and on 16 July 2008, registration was made available to everyone for all .me domains at various registrars.

.ME registry
www.domen.me	.ME registry in Montenegrin
www.domain.me	.ME registry in English
www.nic.me	Former .ME registry
Government of Montenegro
www.me	Montenegro general information
www.gov.me	Government of Montenegro
www.szr.gov.me	Secretariat for Economic Development
University of Montenegro
www.ucg.ac.me	University of Montenegro main site
www.cis.ac.me	Center for Information-Systems
www.etf.ac.me	Faculty of Electrical Engineering
www.ef.ac.me www.ekonomija.ac.me	Faculty of Economics
www.pmf.ac.me	Faculty of Natural Sciences and Mathematics

== Domain structure for .me ==
The domain .me was assigned to Montenegro as a country code after it became an independent nation in June 2006. However, the Montenegro government decided .me would be operated as a generic name after considering the potential worldwide appeal for the domain.

Third-level registrations are available to Montenegrin citizens and companies in the following zones:

- .co.me – unlimited registration, but appropriate for corporations
- .net.me – unlimited registration, but appropriate for providers of Internet services
- .org.me – unlimited registration, but appropriate for civil organizations and associations
- .edu.me – Educational institutions, such as primary and high schools
- .ac.me – Academic and post-secondary organizations such as universities; University of Montenegro has ucg.ac.me as its primary domain
- .gov.me – State and Government authorities
- .its.me or .priv.me – unlimited registration, but appropriate for personal use. Both domains have been suspended by the registry.

== Sunrise, land rush, and open registration periods ==
On 6 May 2008, the .me registry opened the sunrise period for all eligible trademark holders anywhere in the world.

Throughout June and July 2008, multiple land rush applications were received, which resulted in more than 2,500 land rush auctions that were held during July and August 2008. Go Live was opened on 17 July 2008 when registrations were made available for all unreserved .me domains via various registrars.

During the .me land rush auction period, more than US$2,000,000 was generated with names like insure.me and sync.me going to the highest bidder.

At the beginning of August 2008, 100,000 .me domain names were registered. Sources say part of the worldwide appeal for the .me domain is the marketing aspect.

In 2008 in terms of the number of Web pages indexed by Google among all TLDs, .me sites have enjoyed the fastest growth with more than 50% a month. In the same year, .me topped its potential rivals .mobi and .asia in Alexa Internet top one million websites with 341 .me sites versus 233 .mobi sites and 86 .asia sites. Extra potential of .me is revealed considering the fact that .mobi was launched two years before .me and .asia four months before .me.

By the middle of February 2009, 200,000 .me domain names were registered.

On 15 May 2009, the number of registered .me domain names rose to 250,000.

In less than a year .me became more popular than .asia, .jobs, .coop, .aero, .int, .mil, .museum, .name, .pro, .tel, .travel, and 200 other country code top-level domains.

== .me domain statistics ==
By 2010, over 320,000 .me domains had been purchased, making it the fastest-selling top-level domain in history.

By 30 March 2016, the .me domain space had reached over one million domain registrations.

== Known hacks ==
Most .me domain names were purchased as domain hacks in English and, to a lesser extent, Dutch; 71% of names were applied for by applicants in the United States. Because of the possibility of owning pure verb and pronoun combinations, their prices have stayed high: during the sunrise period, insure.me went for $68,005, and judge.me sold for $8000 in 2011.

.me has been used as an abbreviation for the Middle East, for Maine, and for the accusative case of ja (I in South Slavic languages). Other examples of domain hacks include deviantArt (fav.me), WordPress (wp.me), the Despicable Me website, and MeetMe.

== Premium domains ==
.me subdomain names must be between 3 and 63 characters in length, but a few exceptions have been granted, mainly for URL shortening purposes. Examples of shortened domain names include:

- Accession of Montenegro to the European Union portal, Ministry of Foreign Affairs and European Integration of Montenegro (eu.me)
- Facebook (fb.me)
- Facebook Messenger (m.me)
- GoDaddy (go.me)
- Google+ (g.me)
- Infomaniak (ik.me)
- Lime (transportation company) (li.me)
- Namecheap for Education (nc.me)
- PayPal (pp.me)
- ProtonMail (pm.me and proton.me)
- Telegram (messaging service) (t.me)
- Turbulenz (ga.me)
- Viber (vb.me)
- Vkontakte (vk.me)
- WhatsApp (wa.me)
- WordPress.com (wp.me)

Yahoo! was using me.me for its project Yahoo! Meme, but the domain name was taken back by the .me registry when the company closed down the portal.

== Trademark disputes ==
In 2008, three trademark cases were filed with the World Intellectual Property Organization Arbitration and Mediation Center. All three domain names (creditmutuel.me, porsche.me, and exxonmobil.me) were transferred to the complainants.

== .cg.yu ==
Prior to the introduction of .me, the most used domain in Montenegro was the second-level domain .cg.yu under .yu, which was controlled by Montenegrin Internet service provider T-Crnogorski Telekom. The abbreviation "CG" was derived from the native name for Montenegro, Crna Gora. When the .yu TLD was phased out, all e-mail addresses ending with @cg.yu were replaced with @t-com.me, and websites were also moved to new TLDs, mostly under .me.

== See also ==
- .me.uk
- .me.us
