= .cs =

Internet country code top-level domain for Czechoslovakia

- Introduced: c. 1990
- Removed: c. 1995
- TLD type: Country code top-level domain
- Status: Discontinued
- Registry: None
- Sponsor: None
- Intended use: Entities connected with Czechoslovakia (originally, until deleted) and later Serbia and Montenegro (reserved, but never used)
- Actual use: Was fairly heavily used in Czechoslovakia until discontinued in favor of .cz and .sk; never used while Serbia and Montenegro existed
- Registration restrictions: No registrations are now taking place
- Structure: Not in root
- Dispute policies: None
- Registry website: None

.cs was for several years the country code top-level domain (ccTLD) for Czechoslovakia. However, the country split into the Czech Republic and Slovakia in 1993, and the two new countries were soon assigned their own ccTLDs: .cz and .sk respectively. The use of .cs was gradually phased out, and the ccTLD was deleted some time around January 1995.

.cs domain first appeared in Internet Assigned Numbers Authority tables in autumn 1990 and in June 1991 in RIPE list. In October 1991 first domain was registered (iac.cs - Institute of Applied Cybernetics in Bratislava), in February 1992 first hosts existed. As of December 1992 40 domains were registered, while maximum number of 114 registered domains was reached in November 1993 and February 1994.

Until the deletion of .yu in 2010, .cs was the most heavily used top-level domain ever to be deleted. Statistics from the RIPE Network Coordination Centre show that even in June 1994, after much of the conversion to .cz and .sk had been done, .cs still had over 2,300 hosts. By comparison, other deleted TLDs (.nato and .zr) may never have reached 10 hosts.

In July 2003, CS became the ISO 3166-1 code for Serbia and Montenegro (Srbija i Crna Gora in Serbian), and remained so until 2006, when the country split and the codes for domains .rs and .me were created. However, Serbia and Montenegro did not use .cs as its ccTLD, but continued instead to use the Yugoslavian ccTLD .yu until it finally expired on 30 March 2010.
