= List of organizations with .int domain names =

This is a list of organizations with .int domain names, in alphabetical order of the second-level domain name. As of 7 November 2022, the .int domain file contains 168 second-level domain designations, but this list has not been updated since 2012.

Organizations in the .int domain are generally international organizations established by treaty. However, some (such as the YMCA) do not meet current restrictions and were grandfathered in from prior acceptance.

== List of organizations ==
Organization name	Web site address
Asian–African Legal Consultative Organization (AALCO)	https://aalco.int/
Alpine Convention (ABIS – Alpenbeobachtungs- und -‍informationssystem)	~~http://www.abis.int/~~ (Inaccessible as of 31 January 2011..) Can be accessed via https://www.alpconv.org/ as of December 14 2024
Volta Basin Authority (Autorité du Bassin de la Volta)	https://www.abv.int/
African, Caribbean, and Pacific Group of States (ACP)	http://www.acp.int/
(unknown)	adsn.int (Note: This domain is listed in the 2012 zone file, but no website can be found at this address.)
Asia-Pacific Network Information Centre (APNIC)	https://www.apnic.int/ (Note: This domain is related to Internet infrastructure; it is not an international intergovernmental organization.)
African Petroleum Producers' Organization (APPO – formerly the African Petroleum Producers Association – APPA)	~~http://www.appa.int/en/pres/index.php~~ (Inaccessible as of 1 January 2018..) Can be accessed via https://apposecretariat.org/ as of December 14 2024
Asia-Pacific Space Cooperation Organization (APSCO)	http://www.apsco.int/
Asia-Pacific Telecommunity (APT)	https://apt.int/
African Risk Capacity Group (ARC)	https://www.arc.int/ (Note: This domain is not listed in the zone file, but is still functional as of 7 November 2022.)
(unknown)	atma.int
African Union (AU)	https://au.int/
Basel Convention Secretariat	http://www.basel.int/default.aspx
Central Bank of West African States (BCEAO – Banque Centrale des Etats de l'Afrique de l'Ouest)	https://bceao.int/
Bank of Central African States (BEAC – Banque des États de l'Afrique Centrale)	https://www.beac.int/
Benelux Union	https://benelux.int/nl/
West African Development Bank (BOAD – Banque Ouest Africaine de Développement)	boad.int (Redirected to https://www.boad.org/ as of 7 November 2022.)
Benelux Office for Intellectual Property (BOIP)	https://www.boip.int/en
Ibero-American Cinematographic Intervention Agreement (Conferencia de Autoridades Audiovisuales y Cinematográficas de Iberoamérica – CAACI)	caaci.int (Redirected to https://www.caci-iberoamerica.org/ as of 7 November 2022.)
Convention on Biological Diversity (Secretariat)	https://www.cbd.int/
Centre for Environment and Development for the Arab Region and Europe (CEDARE)	http://www.cedare.int/
Central European Free Trade Agreement (CEFTA)	https://cefta.int/
Central European Initiative (CEI)	https://www.cei.int/
Economic and Monetary Community of Central Africa (CEMAC – Communaute Economique at Monetaire de l'Afrique Centrale)	https://cemac.int/
CERN	https://cern.int/ (Redirected to https://home.cern/ as of 29 November 2021.)
International Potato Center (CIP – Centro Internacional de la Papa)	cip.int (Redirected to https://cipotato.org/ as of 7 November 2022.)
Commonwealth of Independent States (CIS)	~~http://www.cis.int/~~ (Inaccessible as of 31 January 2011..)
Convention on the Conservation of Migratory Species of Wild Animals (CMS)	https://www.cms.int/
Council of Europe (COE)	https://www.coe.int/en/web/portal/home
Commonwealth of Learning (COL)	~~http://www.col.int/~~ ()
Common Market for Eastern and Southern Africa (COMESA)	https://www.comesa.int/
Commonwealth Secretariat	https://cwlearn.commonwealth.int/ (Most subdomains redirected to http://www.thecommonwealth.org/ as of 30 May 2013. Other historical subdomains include ~~http://aventail.commonwealth.int/~~, and ~~http://comsharex.commonwealth.int~~.)
Commission of Telecommunications of Central America (COMTELCA)	comtelca.int
International Cospas-Sarsat Programme	https://cospas-sarsat.int/en
Benelux Court of Justice	https://courbeneluxhof.int/
Caribbean Regional Fisheries Mechanism (CRFM)	https://crfm.int/
Technical Centre for Agricultural and Rural Cooperation ACP-EU (CTA) (Centre Technique de Coopération Agricole et Rurale)	https://www.cta.int/en
Preparatory Commission for the Comprehensive Nuclear-Test-Ban Treaty Organization	~~http://www.ctbto.int/~~ (Inaccessible as of 1 January 2017..)
Commonwealth Telecommunications Organisation (CTO)	https://cto.int/
Caribbean Telecommunications Union (CTU)	https://ctu.int/
East African Community (EAC)	https://www.eac.int/
European Central Bank (ECB)	ecb.int (Redirected to https://www.ecb.europa.eu/home/html/index.en.html as of 7 November 2022.)
European Centre for Medium-Range Weather Forecasts (ECMWF)	https://www.ecmwf.int/
Economic Cooperation Organization (ECO)	https://eco.int/
Economic Community of West African States (ECOWAS)	https://ecowas.int/
Eastern Caribbean Telecommunications Authority (ECTEL)	https://www.ectel.int/
EDU – An Intergovernmental Organization for Accreditation in Higher Learning	https://www.edu.int/
European Forest Institute (EFI)	https://efi.int/
Egyptian Friendship Organization (EFO)	~~http://efo.int/~~ (Inaccessible as of 31 January 2011..)
European Free Trade Association (EFTA)	https://www.efta.int/
EFTA Court	https://eftacourt.int/
EFTA Surveillance Authority	https://www.eftasurv.int/
Co-operative Programme for Monitoring and Evaluation of the Long-Range Transmission of Air Pollutants in Europe (unofficially, the "European Monitoring and Evaluation Programme" – EMEP)	https://emep.int/
European Public Law Organization (EPLO)	https://www1.eplo.int/
European Patent Office (EPO)	epo.int (Redirected to https://www.epo.org/ as of 7 November 2022.)
European and Mediterranean Plant Protection Organization	https://www.eppo.int/
Academy of European Law (ERA – Europäische Rechtsakademie)	https://www.era.int/
European Space Agency (ESA)	https://www.esa.int/
European Topic Centre on Waste and Material Flows	~~http://www.etc-waste.int/~~ (Inaccessible as of 30 June 2002..)
European Union	eu.int
Euclid University	https://euclid.int/
European Organisation for the Exploitation of Meteorological Satellites (EUMETSAT)	https://www.eumetsat.int/
European Organisation for the Safety of Air Navigation (Eurocontrol)	https://www.eurocontrol.int/
International Organisation for the Development of Fisheries in Central and Eastern Europe (Eurofish)	eurofish.int (See https://eurofish.dk)
European Telecommunications Satellite Organization (EUTELSAT IGO)	https://www.eutelsatigo.int/en/home/
Food and Agriculture Organization (FAO)	
Pacific Islands Forum Fisheries Agency (FFA)	https://ffa.int/
Global Development Network (GDN)	https://gdn.int/
Global Inventory Project (GIP)	~~http://www.gip.int/en/noframes.htm~~ ()
Great Lakes Fishery Commission (GLFC)	http://glfc.int/
Gulf Monetary Council (GLFC)	https://gmco.int/Home.aspx?lang=en-us
International Anti-Corruption Academy (IACA)	https://www.iaca.int/
International Atomic Energy Agency (IAEA)	~~http://www.iaea.int/~~ (Old page briefly shown, then redirected to ~~http://www.iaea.org/worldatom/~~.)
Inter-American Institute for Global Change Research (IAI)	https://www.iai.int/
International Bank for Economic Co-operation (IBEC)	https://ibec.int/
International Civil Aviation Organization (ICAO)	https://www.icao.int/Pages/default.aspx
International Criminal Court (ICC – Cour Pénale Internationale – CPI)	https://www.icc-cpi.int/
International Commission for the Conservation of Atlantic Tunas (ICCAT)	https://iccat.int/en/
International Council for the Exploration of the Sea (ICES)	ices.int
International Center for Promotion of Enterprises (ICPE)	https://icpe.int/
Inter-American Development Bank	idb.int
International Institute for Democracy and Electoral Assistance (International IDEA)	https://www.idea.int/
International Development Law Organization (IDLO)	https://idlo.int/
International Emergency Management Organization (IEMO)	https://www.iemo.int/
International Fund for Agricultural Development	ifad.int
International Finance Corporation (IFC)	ifc.int
Intergovernmental Authority on Development (IGAD)	https://igad.int/
International Grains Council (IGC)	https://igc.int/en/default.aspx
International Hydrographic Organization (IHO)	https://iho.int/
Inter-American Investment Corporation (IIC – See Inter-American Development Bank)	iic.int
Inter-American Institute for Cooperation on Agriculture (IICA)	https://iica.int/en
International Labour Organization (ILO)	https://ilo.int
International Monetary Fund (IMF)	imf.int
International Bamboo and Rattan Organisation (INBAR)	https://www.inbar.int/
Institute of Nutrition of Central America and Panama (Instituto de Nutrición de Centro América y Panamá – INCAP)	http://www.incap.int/index.php/en
International Iberian Nanotechnology Laboratory (INL)	https://inl.int/
Intelsat	~~http://www.intelsat.int/~~ (Revoked sometime after this became a commercial entity. A revocation notice is – but only briefly shown, then the page is redirected to https://www.intelsat.com/.)
International Criminal Police Organization (Interpol)	https://www.interpol.int/
International Organization for Migration (IOM)	https://www.iom.int/
Internet Assigned Numbers Authority (IANA)	ip4.int
International Pacific Halibut Commission (IPHC)	https://iphc.int/
International Plant Protection Convention (IPPC)	https://www.ippc.int/en
International Social Security Association (ISSA)	https://web.archive.org/web/20230924160645/https://ww1.issa.int/
International Telecommunications Satellite Organization (ITSO)	https://itso.int/
International Tropical Timber Organization (ITTO)	https://www.itto.int/
International Telecommunication Union (ITU)	https://www.itu.int/en/Pages/default.aspx (French: https://www.itu.int/fr/Pages/default.aspx; Spanish: https://www.itu.int/es/pages/default.aspx)
International Vaccine Institute (IVI)	https://www.ivi.int/
International Whaling Commission (IWC)	https://iwc.int/en
(unknown)	kedo.int
League of Arab States (LAS)	las.int
Maritime Information Society (MARIS)	~~http://maris.int/start.htm~~ (Inaccessible as of 1 January 2017..)
Southern Common Market (Mercado Común del Sur – Mercosur)	https://www.mercosur.int/en
Northwest Atlantic Fisheries Organization (NAFO)	https://www.nafo.int/
North Atlantic Salmon Conservation Organization (NASCO)	https://nasco.int/
NATO Parliamentary Assembly (NATO PA)	https://www.nato-pa.int/
North Atlantic Treaty Organization (NATO)	https://www.nato.int/
New Development Bank (NDB)	https://www.ndb.int/
Nordic Investment Bank	https://www.nib.int/
North Pacific Fisheries Commission (NPFC)	https://www.npfc.int/
Nordic Patent Institute	https://npi.int/
Internet Assigned Numbers Authority (IANA)	nsap.int
African Intellectual Property Organization (Organisation Africaine de la Propriété Intellectuelle – OAPI)	http://oapi.int/index.php/en
Organization of American States (OAS)	oas.int
Organisation for Joint Armament Cooperation (Organisation Conjointe de Coopération en matière d'ARmement – OCCAR)	https://www.occar.int/
Organisation for Economic Co-operation and Development (OECD)	oecd.int (Note: As of 7 November 2022, attempts to access Web sites at this domain resulted in SSL errors.) (Moved to https://www.oecd.org/.)
Organisation of Eastern Caribbean States (OECS)	oecs.int (Redirected to https://www.oecs.org/en/ as of 7 November 2022.)
Office of the High Representative for Bosnia and Herzegovina (OHR)	http://www.ohr.int/en/
World Organisation for Animal Health (WOAH) (formerly the Office International des Epizooties – OIE)	oie.int (Redirected to https://www.woah.org/ as of 7 November 2022.)
International Organization of Legal Metrology (Organisation Internationale de Métrologie Légale – OIML)	http://www.oiml.int/en
International Organisation of Vine and Wine (OIV)	https://www.oiv.int/
Organisation Mondiale de la Propriété Intellectuelle (OMPI – World Intellectual Property Organization – WIPO)	ompi.int (Redirected to https://www.wipo.int/portal/en/index.html as of 7 November 2022.)
Sovereign Military Order of Malta (SMOM)	https://www.orderofmalta.int/
Organization for Security and Co-operation in Europe (OSCE)	osce.int (Redirected to https://www.osce.org/ as of 7 November 2022.)
Parliamentary Assembly of the Mediterranean (PAM)	https://pam.int/
Central American Parliament (Parlamento Centroamericano – PARLACEN)	https://parlacen.int/inicio
Pacific Aviation Safety Office (PASO)	http://paso.int/ (Note: As of 7 November 2022, this URL presented a "temporarily unavailable" error message.) (Inaccessible as of 7 January 2018.. without images. Moved to https://paso.aero/.)
Rotterdam Convention on the Prior Informed Consent Procedure for Certain Hazardous Chemicals and Pesticides in International Trade (PIC)	http://pic.int/default.aspx
North Pacific Marine Science Organization (known as PICES – a Pacific version of the International Council for the Exploration of the Sea)	https://meetings.pices.int/
Stockholm Convention on Persistent Organic Pollutants (POPs)	http://pops.int/default.aspx
Regional Cooperation Council (RCC) of the South-East European Cooperation Process	https://www.rcc.int/
(unknown)	rdi.int
International Federation of Red Cross and Red Crescent Societies	~~http://www.redcross.int/~~ ()
Secure Electronic Transaction LLC (SET)	~~http://www.set-ca.card.reg.int/~~ (Inaccessible as of 31 January 2011..)
ReliefWeb – a service provided by the United Nations Office for the Coordination of Humanitarian Affairs (OCHA)	https://reliefweb.int/
Regional School of Public Administration (ReSPA)	respa.int
Regional Integrated Multi-Hazard Early Warning System for Africa and Asia	https://www.rimes.int/
Réseaux IP Européens Network Coordination Centre (RIPE NCC)	~~http://www.ripe.int/~~ ()
Southern African Customs Union (SACU)	https://sacu.int/
Southern African Development Community (SADC)	https://www.sadc.int/
Seanet	https://seanet.int/ (Note: As of 7 November 2022, this URL presented an apparently blank page.)
Central American Integration System (Sistema de la Integración Centroamericana – SICA)	https://www.sica.int/
Secretariat for Central American Economic Integration (Secretaría de Integración Económica Centroamericana – SIECA)	https://www.sieca.int/?lang=en
Central American Social Integration Secretariat (Secretaría de la Integración Social Centroamericana – SISCA)	https://sisca.int/
Square Kilometre Array Observatory (SKAO)	https://www.skao.int/
System for the Observation of and Information on the Alps (SOIA – See also Alpine Convention)	~~http://www.soia.int/preAC/home.en.htm~~ (Inaccessible as of 31 January 2011..)
Consultative Committee for Space Data Systems (CCSDS)	sol.int
South Pacific Applied Geoscience Commission (SOPAC – Became the Geoscience, Energy and Maritime Division of the Pacific Community)	Main page: ~~http://sopac.int/~~ () Auxiliary page: ~~http://www.sopac.int/tiki-index.php~~ ()
South Centre	https://www.southcentre.int/
Pacific Community (Originally known as the South Pacific Commission – SPC)	https://spc.int/
South Pacific Regional Fisheries Management Organisation (SPRFMO)	https://www.sprfmo.int/
South Asian University(SAU)(Established by SAARC Countries)	https://sau.int/
Science and Technology Center in Ukraine (STCU)	http://www.stcu.int/
Commonwealth of Nations	~~thecommonwealth.int~~
The Phone Company Remote Printing Service (Note: This domain does not belong to an international treaty organization, and so does not meet current .INT requirements. It may (arguably) be related to Internet infrastructure.)	~~http://www.tpc.int/~~ ()
University of Central Asia	uca.int (Note: As of 7 November 2022, this URL presented a "Web Site not found" error message.) (Inaccessible as of 28 December 2021. without images.)
Union Economique et Monetaire Ouest Africaine (UEMOA – West African Economic and Monetary Union)	http://www.uemoa.int/
International Telecommunication Union (ITU – Union internationale des télécommunications – Unión Internacional de Telecomunicaciones – UIT)	uit.int (Redirected to https://www.itu.int/en/Pages/default.aspx as of 7 November 2022.)
United Nations (UN)	https://www.un.int/
United Nations Convention to Combat Desertification (UNCCD)	https://unccd.int/
United Nations Educational, Scientific and Cultural Organization (UNESCO)	unesco.int (Redirected to https://www.unesco.org/en/member-states-portal as of 7 November 2022.)
United Nations Framework Convention on Climate Change (UNFCCC)	https://unfccc.int/
(unknown)	unilat.int
International Union for the Protection of New Varieties of Plants (UPOV)	https://web.archive.org/web/20250930191414/https://www.upov.int/portal/index.html.en
Universal Postal Union (UPU)	https://www.upu.int/en/Home
Western and Central Pacific Fisheries Commission (WCPFC)	https://www.wcpfc.int/
Western European Union (WEU)	~~http://www.weu.int/~~ ()
World Health Organization (WHO)	https://www.who.int/
World Intellectual Property Organization (WIPO)	https://www.wipo.int/portal/en/index.html (Also French: https://www.ompi.int. This page holds incorrect certificates.)
World Meteorological Organization (WMO)	https://wmo.int/
World Nature Organization (WNO)	~~http://www.wno.int/~~ ()
World Bank	~~http://www.worldbank.int/~~ (Moved to http://www.worldbank.org/.)
World Trade Organization (WTO)	~~http://www.wto.int/~~ (This page presents two "404 error" messages while loading, but does load afterward. Moved to https://www.wto.org/.)
French National Police	https://www.pn.int/
World Alliance of YMCA‍s (Note: This domain does not belong to an international treaty organization, and so does not meet current .INT standards, but was created before the current standards were formulated.)	https://www.ymca.int/
