= Sponsored top-level domain =

Top-level domain that has a sponsor representing a specific community

A sponsored top-level domain (sTLD) is one of the categories of top-level domains (TLDs) maintained by the Internet Assigned Numbers Authority (IANA) for use in the Domain Name System of the Internet, alongside country-code top-level domains (ccTLD) and generic top-level domains (gTLD).

A sponsored TLD is a specialized top-level domain that has a sponsor representing a specific community served by the domain. The communities involved are based on ethnic, geographical, professional, technical or other theme concepts proposed by private agencies or organizations that establish and enforce rules restricting the eligibility of registrants to use the TLD.

Generally speaking, a sponsored TLD is a specialized TLD that has a sponsor representing the narrower community that is most affected by the TLD, while an unsponsored TLD operates under policies established by the global Internet community directly through the ICANN process. For example, the .aero TLD is sponsored by SITA, which limits registrations to members of the air transport industry.

Sponsored TLDs
TLD	Eligibility	Sponsors
.aero	Members of the air-transport industry	SITA
.asia	Companies, organisations and individuals in the Asia-Pacific region	DotAsia Organisation
.coop	Cooperative associations	DotCooperation LLC
.edu	US Institutions of higher education	Educause
.gov	United States government, states and local governments	Cybersecurity and Infrastructure Security Agency
.int	International treaty-based organisations	Internet Assigned Numbers Authority
.jobs	Human resource managers	Since 2005: IANA states that the sponsoring organization is Employ Media LLC (private company), but also presents a delegation report that states Employ Media LLC is a registry, and the sponsoring organization is The Society for Human Resource Management (nonprofit organization)
.mil	US Military entities	Defense Information Systems Agency (US government)
.post	Postal services	Universal Postal Union

ICANN only applied the term sponsored TLD to TLDs in the first two rounds of new gTLDs. It did not use the distinction between sponsored and unsponsored for new gTLDs in the 2012 round. Moreover, some sTLDs migrated to non-sponsored gTLDs on the Registry Agreement renewal.

Former Sponsored TLDs
TLD	Eligibility	Former Sponsors
.cat	Catalan linguistic and cultural community	Fundació puntCat
.mobi	Providers and consumers of mobile products and services	mTLD Top Level Domain, Ltd.
.museum	Museums	Museum Domain Management Association
.tel	For businesses and individuals to publish contact data	Since 2008: Telnic Limited Since 2017: Telnames Limited (private company)
.travel	Travel agents, airlines, hoteliers, tourism bureaus, etc.	Since 2005: Tralliance Corporation Since 2015: Registry is Tralliance Registry Management Company, LLC; Since 2018: Registry is Dog Beach, LLC; Since 2020: Registry is Donuts Inc. (private company)
.xxx	Pornographic sites	International Foundation for Online Responsibility (IFFOR)

== Types ==
As of 2015, IANA distinguishes the following groups of top-level domains:

- infrastructure top-level domain (ARPA)
- generic top-level domains (gTLD)
- restricted generic top-level domains (grTLD)
- sponsored top-level domains (sTLD)
- country code top-level domains (ccTLD)
- test top-level domains (tTLD)
