= Treaty of Bern =

1874 treaty establishing the Universal Postal Union

- Signed: 9 October 1874
- Location: Bern, Canton of Bern, Switzerland
- Parties: Austria-Hungary; Belgium; Denmark; Egypt; France; German Empire; Greece; Italy; Luxembourg; Netherlands; Ottoman Empire; Portugal; Romania; Russian Empire; Serbia; Spain; Switzerland; United Kingdom; United Kingdoms of Sweden and Norway; United States

Full text
- Treaty of Bern at Wikisource

Universal Postal Union HQ Bern Switzerland

The Treaty of Bern (formally the Treaty concerning the formation of a General Postal Union), signed on 9 October 1874, established the General Postal Union, which is today known as the Universal Postal Union. Named for the Swiss city of Bern, where it was signed, the treaty was the result of an international conference convened by the Swiss Government on 15 September 1874. It was attended by representatives of 22 nations. Plans for the conference had been drawn up by Heinrich von Stephan, Postmaster-General of the German Reichspost who demanded from the neutral Switzerland the organization of an International Postal Congress following the end of the French-German war of 1870–1871.

The purpose of the treaty was to unify disparate postal services and regulations so that international mail could be exchanged freely. The signatories of the treaty were the German Empire, Austria-Hungary, Belgium, Denmark, Egypt, Spain, the United States, France, Great Britain, Greece, Italy, Luxembourg, the Netherlands, Portugal, Romania, the Russian Empire, Serbia, the United Kingdoms of Sweden and Norway, Switzerland, and the Ottoman Empire.

Originally called the General Postal Union, the organization established by the Treaty was renamed the Universal Postal Union in 1878 due to its large membership. World Post Day is now observed on 9 October recalling the date on which the Treaty was signed.

The Treaty of Bern was amended a number of times after its conclusion. On 10 July 1964, the UPU incorporated the treaty into a new Constitution of the Universal Postal Union, which is now the treaty that is ratified by states when they wish to join the UPU.

The Universal Postal Union Congress of 2021 taking place in Abidjan brought about another significant change to the Treaty of Bern. Previously the agreements of the congress were valid for only 4 years, but since July 1, 2022, when the treaty came into effect, their validity is now no longer limited in time.

== See also ==
- List of members of the Universal Postal Union (ratifications of the Treaty of Bern/UPU Constitution)
