= .yu =

Internet country code top-level domain for Yugoslavia

- Introduced: 15 June 1989
- Removed: 30 March 2010
- TLD type: Country code top-level domain
- Status: Discontinued
- Registry: nic.yu (Yugoslav Internet Domain Registry)
- Sponsor: YUNET Association
- Intended use: Entities connected with the former Yugoslavia and Serbia and Montenegro
- Registration restrictions: Registration not available since 10 March 2008.
- Structure: Registrations were made at third level beneath established subdomains
- Documents: Policy statement
- Registry website: nic.yu (formerly)

.yu was the Internet country code top-level domain (ccTLD) that was assigned to SFR Yugoslavia in 1989 and was mainly used by Serbia and Montenegro and its two successor states. After Montenegro and Serbia acquired separate .me and .rs domains in 2007, a transition period started, and the .yu domain finally expired in 2010.

== History ==
The .yu ccTLD was assigned originally to the Socialist Federal Republic of Yugoslavia, during the government project for the development of scientific-technological information (SNTIJ). The official registrants were the University of Maribor and the Jožef Stefan Institute, which were located in Slovenia. Computer scientist Borka Jerman Blažič registered the domain in 1989, which allowed Yugoslavia to have an Internet connection.

When the SFR Yugoslavia dissolved, Slovenia, Croatia, Bosnia and Herzegovina and North Macedonia registered their own ccTLDs (.si, .hr, .ba and .mk). Serbia and Montenegro formed the Federal Republic of Yugoslavia, but was under international sanctions at the time because of ongoing Yugoslav wars. Between 1992 and 1994, the domain was run by ARNES who only used it for email. ARNES rejected all requests by Serbian institutions for new domains, severely limiting the country's access to the internet. The domain became a succession matter when the Slovenians refused to relinquish the domain name to the University of Belgrade in Serbia, which had requested they do so.

Following the personal intervention of the Internet Assigned Numbers Authority founder Jon Postel, in 1994 IANA finally decreed that the domain should pass to FR Yugoslavia. After that, the domain was managed by the YUNET Association, an organization based in the Faculty of Electrical Engineering at the University of Belgrade.

The FR Yugoslavia renamed itself Serbia and Montenegro in February 2003. The code YU was replaced by CS in July 2003 following the official name change, and the ccTLD .cs was reserved for Serbia and Montenegro after the name change. However, .cs was never actually used, and .yu remained one of the few ccTLDs that did not correspond to a current ISO 3166-1 two-letter code.

The state union of Serbia and Montenegro was dissolved in June 2006, and in September 2006, ISO accordingly proposed the replacement the codes RS for Serbia and ME for Montenegro. On 26 September 2006 the ISO 3166 Maintenance Agency agreed on the change of ISO 3166-1 alpha-2 code CS to RS. The new domains .rs for Serbia and .me for Montenegro became active shortly thereafter.

In September 2007 ICANN resolved that the .yu domain would be operated temporarily under the Serbian National Register of Internet Domain Names (RNIDS), operators of the new .rs domain registry. A two-year transition period started, and the .yu domain was scheduled to expire on 30 September 2009. However, the Serbian registrar requested an extension and ICANN decided to extend the transition deadline another six months. Finally, the Serbian registrar declared the end of the .yu domain at 12:00 CEST on 30 March 2010. All .yu websites that failed to transition were rendered inaccessible, including historical ones. RNIDS estimated there to have been around four thousand active websites using the .yu domain at the time of its deprecation.

== Former use of .yu domains ==
All of the domains directly under .yu were reserved for legal entities only. Top level domain was reserved for federal institutions and official governmental institutions, as well as Internet service providers. The Serbian Orthodox Church was also allowed to use .yu domain.

The second-level domains under .yu included:

- Academic organizations, such as universities, used the .ac.yu domain. For example, the School of Electrical Engineering (ETF) at the University of Belgrade (BG) had the etf.bg.ac.yu domain.
- Educational institutions, such as primary and high schools, used the .edu.yu domain.
- Independent organizations used the .org.yu domain.
- Corporations used the .co.yu domain.
- The Government used the .gov.yu domain.

Montenegrin websites often used the .cg.yu subdomain which was given for free to customers of a Montenegrin ISP which controlled the domain, which made it a popular option for those who opted not to purchase a domain for their website.

== In the media ==
The domain is part of the story in the 2013 mini-documentary film From Yu to Me.

== See also ==
- .rs and .me, the ccTLD pair which replaced .yu since 2007.
