= .xxx =

Internet top-level domain

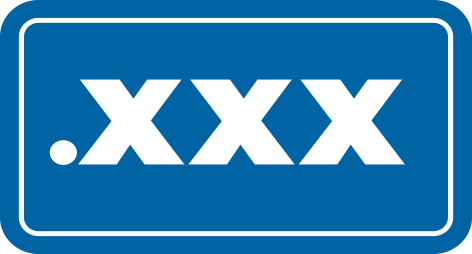
- .xxx TLD Logo from ICM Registry
- Introduced: 15 April 2011; 15 years ago
- TLD type: Sponsored top-level domain
- Status: Generally available
- Registry: ICM Registry, LLC
- Sponsor: International Foundation for Online Responsibility
- Intended use: Internet pornography
- Actual use: Mainly as secondary domains for pornographic websites
- Registration restrictions: Applicants are pre-screened and their existing Web sites checked to ascertain they are part of the adult entertainment community; a post-registration challenge process exists also; standards such as not marketing to minors must be adhered to
- Structure: Direct second-level registrations allowed
- Documents: RFC 3675, ICANN New sTLD RFP Application
- Dispute policies: UDRP, Charter Eligibility Dispute Resolution Procedure (CEDRP), Start-Up Trademark Opposition Procedure (STOP)
- DNSSEC: No
- Registry website: ICM Registry

.xxx is a sponsored top-level domain (sTLD) intended as a voluntary option for pornographic websites on the Internet. This option enables website operators to establish a web address like example.xxx instead of example.com. The sponsoring organization for .xxx is the International Foundation for Online Responsibility (IFFOR). The domain name registry for .xxx was initially operated by ICM Registry. The board of the Internet Corporation for Assigned Names and Numbers (ICANN), the nonprofit that manages several technical aspects of the Internet including the list of top-level domains, approved the .xxx registry agreement with ICM Registry in March 2011. The first .xxx websites went into operation in April 2011.

== Background ==
A generic top-level domain (gTLD) for sexually explicit material was proposed as one tool for dealing with the conflict between those who wish to provide and access such material through the Internet, and those who wish to prevent access to it, such as preventing access by children and adolescents. For example, a report related to the U.S. Child Online Protection Act (1998) said "there are no technical barriers to creating an adult domain, and it would be very easy to block all websites within an adult domain".

Advocates of the idea argued that it would be easier for parents and employers to block the entire TLD, rather than using more complex and error-prone content-based Internet filtering, without imposing any restrictions on those who wish to access it. Editors of explicit content sites, however, were afraid that the use of a single TLD like .xxx would also make it easier for search engines to block all of their content.

Critics of the idea argued that because there would be no requirement for providers of explicit content to use the TLD, sexually explicit material would still be commonplace in other domains, making it ineffectual at restricting access, and simply creating a new "landrush" as registrants of .com domains hosting explicit material attempted to duplicate their registrations in the .xxx domain, competing with operators who hoped to register desirable names unavailable in other TLDs. There was also concern that the existence of .xxx would lead to legislation making its use mandatory for sexually explicit material, leading to legal conflicts over the definition of "sexually explicit", free speech rights, and jurisdiction.

There were early indications that .xxx domain names would be registered not with the intent to focus on pornographic content, but to use the adult connotations as a benefit to a marketing strategy. An example is the registration of kite.xxx, which is aimed at the extreme sport of kitesurfing, thus benefiting from sexual connotations and innuendo for humor and promotional purposes. Another example of a .xxx domain name being registered without a focus on pornographic content was the registration of popebenedict.xxx, which contained pro-Islamic content despite being named after Pope Benedict XVI.

== History ==
=== Proposal by ICM Registry ===
The .XXX TLD was first proposed in 2000 by ICM Registry and resubmitted in 2004, but it faced strong opposition from politicians and conservative groups.

ICANN announced on 1 June 2005 a preliminary approval of .xxx as an sTLD similar to .aero, .travel, etc. ICM said it would charge $60/year for domains. In August 2005, the Bush Administration pressured ICANN not to adopt a .xxx because of increasing concerns about the impact of pornography on families and children. In December 2005, discussions about the implementation of .xxx were taken off the agenda of ICANN Governmental Advisory Committee (GAC), placing its future in doubt. In its March 2006 meeting, the GAC formulated a letter of concern to the ICANN board about .xxx. On 10 May 2006, ICANN reversed the approval. On 6 January 2007, ICANN put up for public comment a revised proposal following changes to the policy of the ICM registry including the policing of any site that signs up to use the .xxx registry. On 30 March 2007, the ICANN board again rejected the .xxx proposal for the third time.

On 6 June 2008, in accordance with ICANN bylaws, ICM filed an application with the International Centre for Dispute Resolution for an independent review challenging ICANN's decision. The filing became ICDR Case No. 50 117 T 00224 08, and in September 2009, a live hearing was held in Washington, DC, where both sides submitted documentary evidence and witness testimony. On 19 February 2010, the ICDR's independent review panel – consisting of Stephen M. Schwebel, Jan Paulsson and Dickran Tevrizian – issued its declaration. The panel found that the application for the ".XXX sTLD met the required sponsorship criteria", and that "the Board's reconsideration of that finding was not consistent with the application of neutral, objective and fair documented policy". At the ICANN meeting in Nairobi in March 2010 the board resolved to consider "process options". A 45-day public comment was opened on 26 March 2010. At the Brussels ICANN meeting in June 2010, the ICANN board resolved to restart the process, including renewed due diligence and GAC consultations.

The Free Speech Coalition expressed opposition to .xxx in early March 2011, arguing it would "harm the adult entertainment business" by inviting censorship and blocking, while raising money for ICM without considering the "best interests of the industry".

On 18 March 2011, ICANN's board approved the execution of the registry agreement with ICM for the .xxx sponsored top level domain. The vote was nine in favor, four against, with three abstentions.

ICM was expected to make over $200 million a year, with 3 to 5 million domain registrations, as companies were anticipated to defensively register their domains.

=== Opening of registrations ===
The TLD entered its sunrise period on 7 September 2011; the sunrise period ended 28 October 2011. Landrush period lasted from 8 November through 25 November, and general availability commenced on 6 December 2011.

=== Manwin suits ===
On 16 November 2011, Manwin International, a pornography company that operates a large number of popular adult websites including YouPorn, filed a request for a second ICANN Independent Review Proceeding. In the request, Manwin asked that the .xxx delegation be voided, or, if not, put up to competition on renewal.

On the same day, Manwin, together with adult film studio Digital Playground, filed a suit in the Central District of California against ICM alleging antitrust and competition violations. Among the claims in the suit are that ICANN provided "no competitive process for the award of the .XXX registry contract" and that ICM CEO Stuart Lawley "has announced that he expects to be able (and intends) to prevent the establishment of any other (potentially competing) adult-content TLDs, including through a contractual promise by ICANN not to approve such TLDs".

On 14 August 2012, Judge Philip S. Gutierrez granted in part and denied in part ICANN's motion to dismiss Manwin's claims and allowed the case against ICANN to move forward. On 10 May 2013, the case was voluntarily dismissed by the parties, likely due to private settlement.

=== Acquisition of ICM Registry ===
ICM Registry was acquired by Minds + Machines Group Limited, another domain name registry company, in 2018. Minds + Machines Group Limited is listed on the London Stock Exchange.

== Alternative implementations ==
Starting in 2005, there was an alternative implementation of .xxx by New.net, a private domain registration service unaffiliated with ICANN, via an alternative DNS root.

Another unofficial .xxx TLD was previously available through the alternative DNS root system administered by the now-defunct AlterNIC.

== See also ==
- Internet censorship
- Sociology of the Internet
