= New.net =

Alternative DNS root

- Website: new.net
- Launched: 2000; 26 years ago
- Current status: Offline

New.net was an alternative DNS root system which was enabled via NewDotNet, a DNS hijacker application usually bundled with legitimate software. The top-level domains New.net provided included: .agent, .arts, .auction, .chat, .church, .club, .family, .free, .game, .golf, .inc, .law, .llc, .llp, .love, .ltd, .med, .mp3, .school, .scifi, .shop, .soc, .sport, .tech, and .video At one point it offered .travel, .kids, and .xxx but those were removed when they conflicted with domains proposed to ICANN in the first round of creation of new domain names in the primary root since the early history of the DNS.

Alternate access to domains registered under New.net's alternative TLDs was provided by third level domains under the new.net domain name space (e.g., example.shop is actually example.shop.new.net). As of early 2012, New.net seems to have ceased operation, as the web site "new.net" no longer resolved. ICANN started allowing official registrations of new, non-standard top-level domains the same year.

== Adware ==
New.net distributed NewDotNet, an Internet Explorer plugin for Windows that enables the browser to access sites that use these unofficial domain names. It was considered adware and spyware by McAfee Site Advisor. New.net also had partnerships with some ISPs.

Several different versions of NewDotNet existed. Early versions installed themselves into the Windows directory as a DLL named "newdotnet" followed by a version number, and had no uninstall option. Later versions created a folder in the Program Files folder. A version introduced in 2002 (since discontinued) included a pop-up advertising component.

The program functioned by inserting itself into the Winsock system, which could in some situations disrupt network connectivity. Well-known and generally trusted anti-spyware programs like Ad-Aware and Spybot are usually effective at removing older versions of this software. Later versions of NewDotNet could be uninstalled using the standard Windows "Add/Remove Programs" control panel or an uninstaller in "C:\Program Files\New.net". Manual removal, if performed incorrectly, could completely disrupt the computer's ability to access the internet. This could be fixed with an LSP Fix program.

== DNS ==
After New.net released a paper titled "A Proposal to Introduce Market-Based Principles into Domain Name Governance", ICANN responded in July 2001 with strong criticism of the company, including for bypassing established community processes that support the reliability of the Internet. In a poll of readers of ICANN Watch, New.Net was considered the greatest threat to the security of the DNS as matched against other alternatives.

== Lawsuit ==
On 6 May 2003 New.net filed a federal lawsuit in the Central District Court of California against Lavasoft, distributor of Ad-Aware. Their claims against Lavasoft of false advertising, unfair competition, trade libel, and tortious interference were stricken and dismissed with prejudice the following year.

== Legal controversy ==
NewDotNet has been implicated as the cause of a controversial 2007 criminal trial which received international media coverage. In State of Connecticut v. Julie Amero, a substitute teacher was arrested after students in her seventh grade class reported that they had seen pornographic images on her computer screen. Amero said the computer would not stop sending pop-ups and that she did not know what to do with the computer.

Amero was convicted on four counts of risk of injury to a minor, or impairing the morals of a child, and faced up to 40 years in prison. The state Supreme Court overturned the conviction and ordered a new trial, but Amero instead pleaded guilty to the lesser charge of disorderly conduct and had her Connecticut teaching credentials revoked. A subsequent forensic analysis revealed that the uncontrollable pornographic pop-ups were propagated by NewDotNet.

== See also ==
- Kazaa
