= .post =

Internet top-level domain for the postal union

- Introduced: 2012
- TLD type: Sponsored top-level domain
- Status: Active
- Registry: Afilias
- Sponsor: Universal Postal Union
- Intended use: UPU members; post offices; postal sector-related organizations
- Actual use: In use by UPU members
- Registration restrictions: Registrants must be approved as being members of the postal community before registering domains
- Structure: Full authentication of verification of eligible registrants with structured naming rules for second and third-level registrations.
- Documents: ICANN New sTLD RFP Application.Post Sponsored TLD Agreement
- Dispute policies: UDRP
- DNSSEC: yes
- Registry website: info.post

.post is a sponsored top-level domain (STLD), available exclusively for the postal sector, and is secured by DNSSEC. The domain aims to integrate the physical, financial, and electronic dimensions of postal services to enable and facilitate e-post, e-finance, e-commerce, and e-government services. ICANN approved the domain on April 8, 2005, as a sponsored TLD in the second group of new TLD applications evaluated in 2004.

In 2004, the Universal Postal Union (UPU), based in Bern, was the first United Nations agency to secure a top-level domain (TLD) from ICANN.

In 2009, ICANN and the UPU signed a historic agreement, giving the UPU managing authority over .post as a top-level domain. The agreement came about after negotiations and public review through ICANN's public comment process, reviews within the UPU governing councils, and consideration by ICANN's Board of Directors.

Having been delegated authority for .post, the UPU develops, implements, and monitors government rules for it. It is also responsible for attributing domain names to postal-sector stakeholders who meet the eligibility criteria.

The STLD was added to the IANA TLD registry on August 8, 2012.

== Purpose ==
.post was designed to serve the needs of the global postal community in cyberspace. The idea behind .post was to identify legitimate postal services and avoid confusion for individuals, businesses, and stakeholders. As of October 2014, out of 192 UPU member countries, 38 are full members of the Dot Post Group (DPG), which is appointed to oversee the development of this platform. A few of those have already launched their .post web site. Most of them offer a web interface to traditional post office services such as printed letters and parcels delivery. One of them also features Postal Registered Electronic Mail (PREM) among its services.

== Authentication ==
To register a .post domain, the UPU asks entities to submit a Community ID request. Registrants must be approved as being members of the .post Sponsored Community before registering domains.

Prior to registering a .post domain, the UPU verifies the registrant's eligibility to register a domain name and issues a .post Community ID.

Each applicant is required to provide legal proof of ownership of the string, as well as falling into 1 of 11 Registrant Groups set out in paragraph 3.2 of the .post Domain Management Policy.
