= International Cooperative Alliance =

Federation of worldwide cooperatives

- Type: Cooperative federation
- Industry: Activities of other membership organizations; N.E.C.; Cooperative movement
- Founded: 1895
- Headquarters: Brussels, Belgium
- Area served: Worldwide
- Key people: Ariel Guarco (President); Jeroen Douglas (Director general)
- Revenue: 5,987,100 euro (2024)
- Members: >300 organizations
- Website: ica.coop

The International Cooperative Alliance (ICA) is a non-governmental organization established in 1895. The ICA represents 306 cooperative federations and organizations and approximately one billion individuals across 105 countries.

ICA activities encompass representing cooperatives and supporting their adaptation to societal changes, which covers the inclusion of underrepresented groups (like women and youth) and a support to cooperative digital strategies.

== History ==
The ICA was established in 1895, and held its first congress in London the same year. In 1896, the ICA confirmed it was politically neutral. In 1937, its Co-operative Principles were reviewed for the first time at the 15th World Co-operative Congress in Paris; amendments followed in 1966.

In 1995, the ICA adopted a revised Statement on the Co-operative Identity, which states that a co-operative is an "autonomous association of persons united voluntarily to meet their common economic, social and cultural needs and aspirations through a jointly owned and democratically-controlled enterprise."

In 2006, the ICA published the first major index of the world's largest cooperative and mutual enterprises, the ICA Global 300. Since 2011, together with the European Research Institute on Cooperative and Social Enterprises (EURICSE), the ICA Global 300 developed into the World Cooperative Monitor, which collects economic, organizational, and social data about cooperatives worldwide, including top 300 rankings and sectoral analysis. Since 2018, each edition of the Monitor has had a theme; in 2022 the theme was digitalization and cooperative identity.

Since 2014, the ICA has participated in the G20 Engagement Groups in various task forces, discussions, and official documents. In 2018, the ICA created the International Cooperative Entrepreneurship Think Tank (ICETT) to study and discuss entrepreneurship in cooperative enterprises. In 2020, the ICA established the Cooperative G20 Working Group.

The ICA also coordinates celebrations of the International Day of Cooperatives.

In 2020, the ICA introduced "A People-Centered Path to a Second Cooperative Decade", its strategic plan for 2020-2030. This plan was developed following consultations with members and replaced the earlier "Blueprint for a Cooperative Decade".

== Efforts ==
The ICA promotes gender equality through open membership, enabling of women participation, and its Gender Equality Committee (formerly the Global Women's Committee). ICA research and reporting attempts to identify structural barriers (such as unpaid care work and financial exclusion) and under-representation of women in leadership roles. In 2009, Dame Pauline Green became the first woman president of the ICA; she had previously served as British Member of the European Parliament and chief executive of the UK's Cooperative Union.

The ICA also supports the inclusion of youth in the cooperative movement. In 2021, at the 33rd ICA World Cooperative Congress in Seoul, board members approved the creation of a Youth Committee to promote cooperative values, principles, and engagement in young people.

The ICA's CM50 Commitment Plan and Charter is intended to strengthen contributions to critical areas, including digital transformation and platform cooperativism. The ICA commissioned a discussion paper to explore how to and support platform cooperatives within the wider digital economy.

Together with National Cooperative Business Association CLUSA International, the ICA is a co-owner of DotCooperation LLC (DotCoop) which manages the .coop domain, intended for the use of cooperatives. During the COVID-19 pandemic, DotCoop launched a digital transformation campaign to encourage cooperatives worldwide to embrace an online identity.

== Insignia ==
The ICA adopted its original rainbow flag in 1924, with the seven colors symbolizing unity in diversity, and the power of light, enlightenment, and progress.

Official use of the rainbow ICA flag ended in 2001. The current flag has a plum background and a white ICA logo in the center.

Flag used by the International Cooperative Alliance from 1924 to 2001.

Current ICA Flag
