= AlterNIC =

Alternative internet domain name registry

AlterNIC was an unofficial, controversial Internet domain name registry that relied on an alternative DNS root. The primary purpose of the project was to challenge the monopoly of InterNIC, the official governing body for generic top-level domains (gTLDs) until the creation of the ICANN in 1998. AlterNIC offered second level domain registration in its own TLDs at lower prices than InterNIC. However, these domain names could only be resolved by name servers that were specifically configured to use the AlterNIC root zone. The project is now defunct; the domain name alternic.net is parked and no longer associated with AlterNIC.

== History ==
Eugene Kashpureff, Jason Hendeles and Diane Boling created AlterNIC in 1995, defining it as a privately developed and operated Internet network information center and domain name registry service, with the purpose of enhancing the Internet with new information services.

In the mid-1990s, the Internet was in a governance transition phase. Until then, the organizational structure of the network was still heavily influenced by its military, academic and governmental origins. At the same time, there was a rapidly increasing interest of private companies, followed by the general public, to gain access to the Internet. Domain names began to play a crucial role in business visibility, and the number of registrations grew exponentially.

Initially, registration of new domain names and their maintenance involved no direct costs for the registrant. In 1995, the National Science Foundation authorized Network Solutions (NSI), the private company that they had mandated to maintain and operate the registries, to begin charging registrants an annual fee. Some perceived this move as unfair, given that the market was closed to competitors.

Eugene Kashpureff and company were among them and they decided to create an alternative registry to challenge the monopoly of NSI.

== Alternative TLDs ==
AlterNIC started operating their registries even though their name servers were not included in the Internet official root zone. As a result, only users of manually reconfigured name servers were able to resolve AlterNIC names.

AlterNIC offered several dozens of alternative TLDs, such as

- .alt
- .biz (unrelated to the subsequent, official .biz gTLD created by the ICANN)
- .corp
- .eur (European name services, by NetName)
- .fam
- .fcn (Free Community Network - no cost DNS for charities & non-profits. Inactive.)
- .free
- .sex
- .usa (designed as a competitor to the official .us)
- .wtv (World Tele Virtual Network commercial Internet TV. Inactive.)
- .xxx (unrelated to the .xxx that was first approved, then revoked by the ICANN, and then approved again)

During the experimental phase, domains could be registered without fees using the .exp and .lnx TLDs. Some TLDs such as .ltd, .med or .xxx were operated directly by AlterNIC. The setup fee for AlterNIC registries was $50. The annual fee was $24, half of the $50 that were charged yearly by NSI for a .com or .net domain ($15 of the $50 were retained for a US Government fund).

A notable feature of AlterNIC was the possibility to request a new custom TLD for the same price as for registrations in existing TLDs. Established publishing groups had requested their own names: Wired magazine had reserved .wired and IDG's affiliate in Europe has reserved .idg

== Controversy ==
A part of the Internet community has praised the initiative, with some recent scholarship proposing that alternative DNS roots may allow for a more democratic network control structure. Yet many others considered it harmful to the Internet. Using an alternative DNS root breaks the principle of universal resolvability, unless it is for a strictly private purpose. From a DNS perspective, it prevents some parts of the Internet from reaching other parts. Jon Postel, a significant contributor to Internet standards, asserted that it would lead to chaos. In May 2000, the Internet Architecture Board spoke out strongly against alternative roots in RFC 2826.

== Hijacking of InterNIC's website ==
On July 11, 1997, against the advice of his AlterNIC colleagues, Kashpureff hijacked the InterNIC website, redirecting affected visitors to the AlterNIC website instead, where they could read about the AlterNIC protest or click a link to the InterNIC page. Kashpureff stopped the hijacking three days later on July 14, but started it again on July 18. This led NSI, the operator of the InterNIC website, to file a lawsuit against Kashpureff.

The civil lawsuit was quickly settled, but NSI had also contacted the FBI to investigate whether Kashpureff had broken federal computer crime laws. On October 31, he was arrested in Toronto on U.S. charges related to wire fraud and faced extradition to the United States. After fighting extradition for two months, he waived his rights, and was extradited to New York City. He was released on December 24, given a $100 fine and sentenced to two years probation.

The hijacking was made possible using a DNS cache poisoning attack, exploiting a security vulnerability in versions of BIND earlier than 4.9.6.
