= .sk =

Internet country code top-level domain for Slovakia

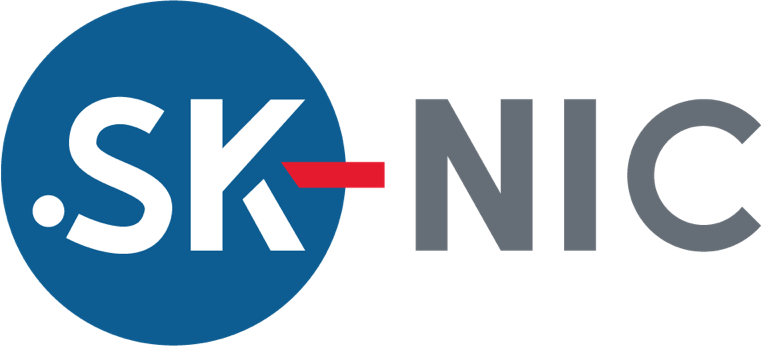
- Introduced: 29 March 1993
- TLD type: Country code top-level domain
- Status: Active
- Registry: SK-NIC
- Sponsor: SK-NIC
- Intended use: Entities connected with Slovakia
- Actual use: Popular in Slovakia
- Registered domains: 465,385 (2023-08-20)
- Registration restrictions: N/A
- Structure: Names can be registered directly at second level, or at the third level beneath, various second-level labels
- Registry website: SK-NIC

.sk is the Internet country code top-level domain (ccTLD) for Slovakia. It is administered by SK-NIC a.s.

SK-NIC, a. s., is the administrator of the top-level domain .sk. It has been recognised since the mid-1990s by the manager of the DNS root zone, the Internet Assigned Numbers Authority, as the delegated manager of .SK (changing its name from EUNET Slovakia to EuroWeb Slovakia in 1999 and to SK-NIC in 2006).

In 2006, SK-NIC transferred some of the competences of domain administration to the State, and submitted to levels of service requirements and a policy-making committee comprising representatives of the internet community as well as the Government.

SK-NIC is the country-code Top Level Domain registry in Europe with most resellers, with over 5900 accredited registrars at its maximum in Slovakia. There are three other ccTLDs registries in the European region with over 1000 registrars, and as an example there are over 40 registrars in neighbouring Czech Republic or over 300 in Germany, largest registry domain-wide.

All staff and technology used by SK-NIC, a.s., is situated in Slovakia, where it advertises 100% of DNS availability rate.

CentralNic acquired SK-Nic from a private Netherlands-based company in December 2017.

Before the split in 1993, the former Czechoslovakia used the domain .cs.
