= International Co-operative Day =

International observance, first Saturday in July

International Day of Cooperatives
- Also called: CoopsDay
- Observed by: Cooperatives all over the world
- Celebrations: Multiple world wide events
- Date: First Saturday in July
- 2025 date: July 5
- 2026 date: July 4
- 2027 date: July 3
- 2028 date: July 1
- Frequency: Annual
- First time: 1995
- Related to: International Co-operative Alliance

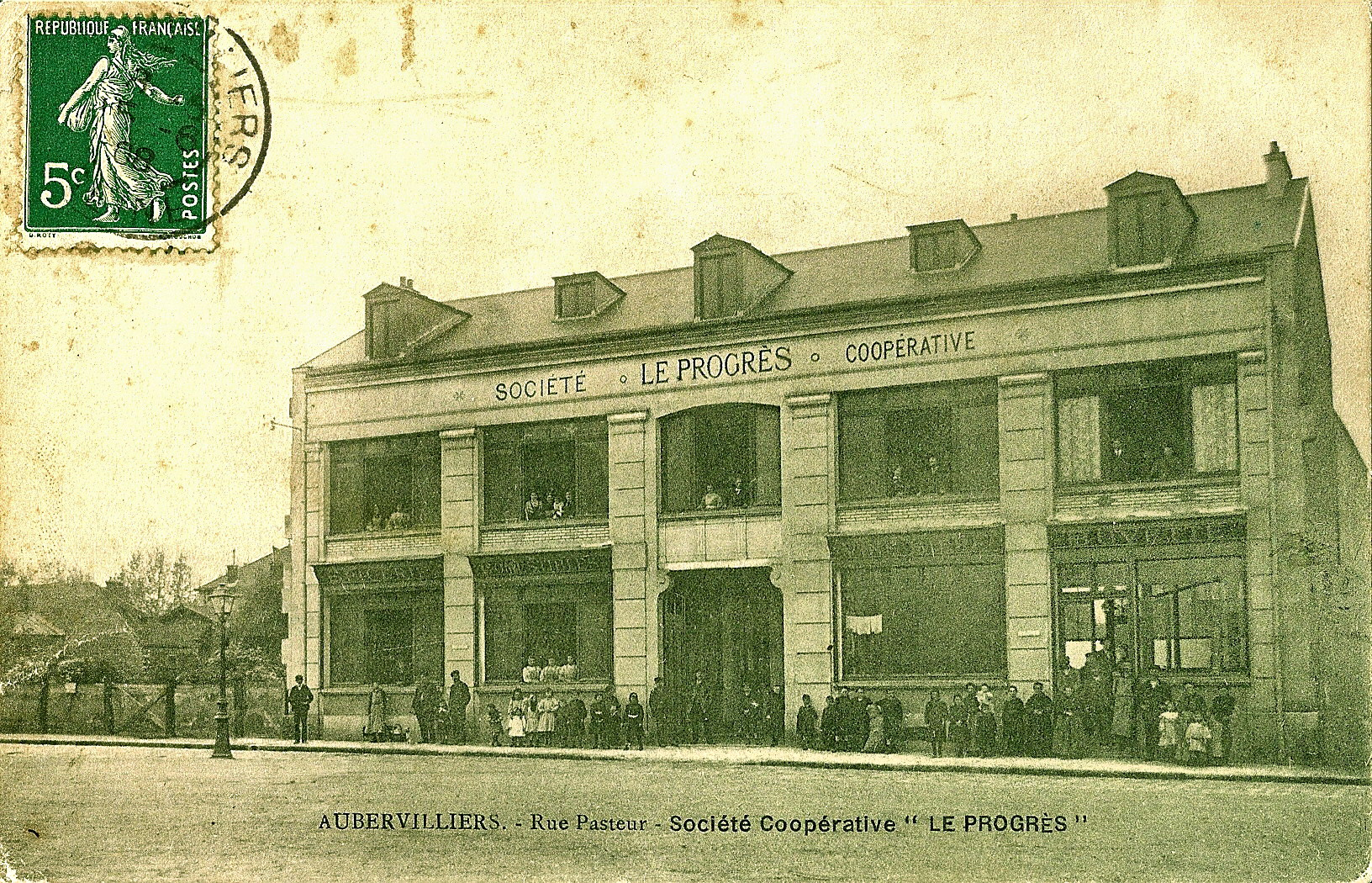
Vintage postcard: AUBERVILLIERS - Rue Pasteur - Cooperative society "Le Progrès"

International Cooperative Day is an annual celebration of the cooperative movement observed on the first Saturday in July since 1923 by the International Cooperative Alliance.

On 16 December 1992, the United Nations General Assembly proclaimed in resolution 47/90 "the first Saturday of July 1995 to be International Day of Cooperatives, marking the centenary of the establishment of the International Cooperative Alliance." Since 1995 the United Nations' International Day of Cooperatives has been observed jointly alongside International Cooperative Day.

Cooperatives around the world celebrate the day in various fashions and each year the organising institutions agree on a theme for the celebrations. The 2010 theme was Cooperative Enterprise Empowers Women, to coincide with the 15th anniversary of the Beijing Platform for Action.

== Previous years' themes ==
- 2026: Cooperatives for a peaceful world
- 2025: Cooperatives: Driving Inclusive and Sustainable Solutions for a Better World
- 2024: Cooperatives Building a Better Future for All
- 2023: Cooperatives for sustainable development
- 2022: Cooperatives Build a Better World
- 2021: Rebuild better together
- 2020: Cooperatives For Climate Action
- 2019: COOPS 4 DECENT WORK
- 2018: Sustainable consumption and production
- 2017: Cooperatives ensure no one is left behind
- 2016: Cooperatives: The power to act for a sustainable future.
- 2015: Choose cooperatives, choose equality
- 2014: Cooperative enterprises achieve sustainable development for all.
- 2013: Cooperative enterprise remains strong in time of crisis.
- 2012: Cooperative enterprises build a better world.
- 2011: Youth, the future of co-operative enterprise
- 2010: Cooperative Enterprise Empowers Women
- 2009: Driving Recovery through Cooperative Enterprise
- 2008: Confronting Climate Change through Cooperative Enterprise
- 2007 Cooperative Values and Principles for Corporate Social responsibility
- 2006 Peace-building through Cooperatives
- 2005: Microfinance is OUR business! Cooperating out of poverty
- 2004: Cooperatives for Fair Globalisation: Creating Opportunities for All
- 2003: Cooperatives Make Development Happen!: The contribution of co-operatives to the United Nations Millennium Development Goals
- 2002: Society and Cooperatives: Concern for Community
- 2001: The Cooperative Advantage in the Third Millennium
- 2000: Cooperatives and Employment Promotion
- 1999: Public Policy and Cooperative Legislation
- 1998: Cooperatives and the Globalization of the Economy
- 1997: The Cooperative Contribution to World Food Security
- 1996: Cooperative Enterprise: Empowerment for People-centred Sustainable Development
- 1995: The ICA Centennial and the Next 100 Years of International Cooperation
