= .asia =

Internet country code top-level domain for Asia

- Introduced: 2007
- TLD type: Sponsored top-level domain
- Status: Active
- Registry: .Asia Registry (Technology Service Provider: Afilias)
- Sponsor: DotAsia Organisation Ltd.
- Intended use: The regional domain extension for Asia and the Pacific
- Registration restrictions: None
- Structure: Registrations at second level (ie. domain.asia)
- Documents: Proposal to ICANN
- Dispute policies: UDRP; Charter Eligibility Dispute Resolution Policy; also local dispute policies for Asian countries based on their local ccTLD policy
- DNSSEC: Yes
- Registry website: www.dot.asia

dotAsia Organization
- Type: Non-profit
- Industry: Internet, Domain registry
- Founded: 2003 in Hong Kong
- Founder: Edmon Chung, Che-Hoo Cheng, Ram Mohan
- Key people: Edmon Chung, Leona Chen, Jennifer Chung
- Website: dot.asia

The top-level domain .asia is the officially designated regional domain in the Internet for Asia and the Pacific. It is a sponsored generic top-level-domain (sTLD) operated by the DotAsia Organisation Ltd. The domain is open to companies, individuals and organisations that have a connection to the region. Asia domains can be seen and used by international and Asian businesses; regional conferences and symposiums; as well as Asian artists and celebrities.

The domain asia was introduced to the public through a comprehensive launch involving a multiphased Sunrise and Landrush process from October 9, 2007, to March 12, 2008. It became available on a first-come-first-served registration basis on March 26, 2008. In 2013, there are more than 455,000 .asia domains registered across 155 countries.

== Roll-out and response ==
.asia founded the first Pioneer Domains Program on July 20, 2007, more than two months prior to the opening of its Sunrise launch. It offered businesses and individuals an opportunity to own and build on any .Asia domain before the TLD opened its doors to mass public registration. Applicants were asked to submit a brief business plan for the domain of choice and make a marketing deposit of US$10,000. The full deposit was returned to successful applicants against proof of marketing attributed to the promotion of the built out .Asia website.

The Pioneer Domains Program marks the first time ever a domain registry is opening its doors for domains based on the quality of proposals received for any domain name of choice. Similar programs (often referred to as "Founders Program" or "RFP process") were implemented by other domain launches since.

=== Pioneer Domains Program ===
.asia founded the first Pioneer Domains Program on July 20, 2007, more than two months prior to the opening of its Sunrise launch. It offered businesses and individuals an opportunity to own and build on any .asia domain before the TLD opened its doors to mass public registration. Applicants were asked to submit a brief business plan for the domain of choice and make a marketing deposit of US$10,000. The full deposit was returned to successful applicants against proof of marketing attributed to the promotion of the built out .asia website.

The Pioneer Domains Program marks the first time ever a domain registry is opening its doors for domains based on the quality of proposals received for any domain name of choice. Similar programs (often referred to as "Founders Program" or "RFP process") were implemented by other domain launches since.

== Community and eligibility ==
The DotAsia Organisation, operator of the .Asia TLD, is governed by the administrators of a community of ccTLDs within the region including .CN (China), .IR (Iran), .JP (Japan), .KR (South Korea), .PH (Philippines), .SG (Singapore) and pan-Asia Internet / Information Technology related groups such as APTLD and APNIC.

The .Asia TLD aims to serve Asian communities worldwide as avowed on their website:

.asia is open to any individual, business and organization around the world, and is fast becoming the web address of choice by Asian personalities, international brands and local initiatives across the Asia-Pacific markets. Beyond the region itself, .asia appeals to Asian communities globally, including Asian Americans, Chinatowns, Korean Towns, Little Indias, etc. around the world.

The registry has adopted the boundaries as defined by ICANN for the Asia / Australia / Pacific (AP) region as a basis for its scope of eligibility. Every .Asia domain must be associated with a Charter Eligibility Contact to be eligible and to help demonstrate that the .ASIA domain is associated with the Asia Pacific region. Since registration criteria are not based on address, this means that one does not necessary have to reside within Asia to own a .Asia domain (as long as the registrant satisfies the Charter Eligibility requirement), and indeed many individuals / entities outside the region have been able to register .Asia domains by selecting a proxy agent (sometimes provided by a registrar or agent).

== Controversy ==
Allegations of insider trading and conflict of interest have been levelled at Pool.com, exclusive auction service provider for the .Asia Sunrise and Landrush. The 'DotAsia.com Plot' describes that the CEO of Pool.com, Richard Schreier, is accused of securing with unfair advantage several premium .Asia domain names via a number of corporations he apparently has links with. Mr Schreier specifies that he does "not have any ownership interest" in the corporations involved. As of 15 May 2008, it is unclear whether Mr Schreier has control over the domains in question, nor whether this would breach the DotAsia contract or any laws for countries that the TLD applies to.

.Asia responded by releasing a Special Advisory clarifying the rules already in place for addressing conflicts of interest and bid rigging issues and that there is no evidence suggesting that bidders have been advantaged or disadvantaged due to their relationship or non-relationship with Pool.com.

Some of the domains in question: porn.asia; dating.asia; insurance.asia; lotto.asia; stocks.asia; auction.asia; beer.asia; fitness.asia; girls.asia; wine.asia

However, all of these domains according to the .ASIA whois service, were awarded during the Sunrise period which means their applications were made with a claim of prior right (registered trademark identical to the domain name). These claims would have been validated by the .ASIA validation partner (there were two, including Deloitte Touche) and where multiple applications were received, the domains would go to auction. The actual auction schedule shows these domains did not go to auction from which it can be concluded there was only a single verified application for the domains in question.

There are ongoing disputes between Dot Asia Organization Ltd. over the ".BOX" and ".SPA" Top Level Domains involving their board members.

== Internationalized domain names ==
.Asia launched registrations for Chinese, Japanese and Korean Internationalized Domain Name (IDN) registrations (e.g. "交易.asia", "ビデオ.asia", "게임.asia") from May 11 – October 11, 2011. Over 10,000 domains were applied during the Sunrise and Landrush launch. Chinese, Japanese and Korean .Asia IDN domains started selling on a first-come-first-served basis on June 21, 2012. .Asia plans to launch other Asian language IDN .Asia domains at a later date.

== DotAsia Organisation ==
The DotAsia Organisation, registry operator of the .Asia domain, is a not-for-profit, membership-based organization with a mandate to promote Internet development and adoption in Asia. DotAsia is headquartered in Hong Kong and formed as an open membership consortium of national / official top-level domain authorities around the region (e.g. ".cn" in China, ".jp" in Japan, ".in" in India, ".sg" in Singapore", etc.) and regional Internet organizations (e.g. APNIC, APTLD, APIA, etc.).

Since the launch of the ".Asia" DotAsia has contributed funds and support to different socio-technological advancement community projects around Asia. These projects include but are not limited to OLPC (One-Laptop-Per-Child Asia Pacific), Information Society Innovations Fund, youth volunteer program & Network: the NetMission Ambassador Program, the Asia Pacific Regional Internet Governance Forum (APrIGF), Digital Review of Asia Pacific.

Together with HN Group in Macau, DotAsia Organisation is also providing its expertise and knowledge to support the Macau government in the operation of the .MO country-code-top-level-domain.
