= DotCooperation =

Registry of .coop domain names

DotCooperation LLC
- Founded: 2001; 24 years ago
- Founder: Midcounties Cooperative
- Owners: National Cooperative Business Association (50%); International Co-operative Alliance (50%)
- Website: www.coop

DotCooperation LLC is the Registry of the Top-Level Domain (TLD) .coop.

It is one of the original four ‘sponsored’ internet namespaces - specialized TLDs that represent a community most affected by the TLD. .coop has been managed by DotCoop LLC since 2002 when the contract with the Internet Corporation for Assigned Names and Numbers (ICANN) was first agreed.

== Responsibilities ==
As the sponsor, DotCoop LLC works within a charter defining the purpose for which the TLD was created and how it is to be operated. It is responsible for developing policies that ensure the TLD is operated for the benefit of the global cooperative community. It is also responsible for selecting the registry operator and, to varying degrees, for establishing the roles played by registrars and their relationship with the registry operator.

DotCoop LLC exercises its delegated authority according to fairness standards and in a manner that is representative of the global cooperative community

== Aims ==
The .coop domain suffix allows cooperatives to identify themselves as member-owned businesses and to help consumers find them. The .coop domain reflects the cooperative movement’s aims of growing awareness of the movement.

== Organisation ==
DotCoop was set up in 2001 by the Midcounties Cooperative to manage the .coop TLD through a subsidiary; Midcounties Co-operative Domains. This body managed the technical operations of the .coop registry under a contract with DotCoop. In 2012, Midcounties Co-operative Domains became Domains.coop, a wholly owned subsidiary of the ICA. Domains.coop Ltd is headquartered in Oxford, UK.

The National Cooperative Business Association (NCBA) and the International Co-operative Alliance (ICA) each own 50% of DotCooperation LLC, headquartered in Washington DC. In 2017, DotCoop LLC became the owner of Domains.coop Ltd., an accredited registrar that, alongside other registrar businesses, retails the .coop domain. Domains.coop records and maintains the contact and technical information that makes up the registration and provides the technical information to the central directory or ‘registry’. This allows computers on the Internet to send e-mail or reach a website. CentralNic provides .coop with the technical infrastructure to maintain the registry.

== Verification ==
The .coop suffix is exclusive to cooperatives and can only be used by recognised cooperatives, associations and businesses whose mission is exclusively to support and promote the cooperative business model. DotCoop LLC is responsible for verifying that all .coop registrants are eligible to use the .coop domain under the terms of the sponsored namespace charter and the ICANN contract and safeguarding the .coop namespace.

Some 8,000 .coop domains by approximately 5,000 co-operatives from 90 countries have been registered.

== Promotion ==
DotCoop LLC is responsible for the promotion of the .coop TLD to the global cooperative community. In 2017 Dotcoop launched a major re-branding campaign - ‘The Dot That Says a Lot’.

== The Global Cooperative Marque ==
.coop administers and promotes the global visual identity of the co-op movement; the Global Cooperative Marque, a logo for cooperatives worldwide, created by the International Cooperative Alliance and used by 3,400 Marque registrants from 106 countries.
