= Yahoo Meme =

Defunct website

Yahoo! Meme
- Website type: mobile social network service, microblogging
- Available in: Multilingual; Portuguese, Spanish, English, Chinese, Indonesian
- Headquarters: Sunnyvale, CA, {{{location_country}}}
- Area served: Worldwide
- Website: meme.yahoo.com
- Commercial: Yes
- Registration: Required
- Current status: Discontinued

Yahoo! Meme was a microblogging site launched by the Yahoo Latin America team in August 2009. The platform was conceived as a mash up of functionality derived from Twitter and Tumblr. Its beta version was originally launched to a Brazilian (Portuguese language) audience with later versions expanding into Spanish, English, Chinese, and Indonesian audiences.

== Concept ==
A user would first create an account from the Meme splash page and begin with an empty blog format similar to Tumblr. After entering a 100-character or less title and choosing an avatar to personalize their blog, the user could then choose to upload and post text, images, videos and MP3 music files to their blog reel. The posts would then cascade one after another on a user's blog. Each post was integrated with a comment system that allowed users and followers to individually comment on submissions.

Users could also search for public accounts and follow fellow Meme users. Similar to Twitter, it was a one-way follow system, which meant the items from followed users will appear in their streams as content mixed in with their own posts.

== API ==
In order to compete with Twitter and Tumblr, Yahoo! provided its own API to Meme developers. Its API was built on top of the YQL (Yahoo! Query Language) platform. It featured compliance with OAuth (OpenAuth) as a means to access to user data. Not only could developers create useful Meme applications, Yahoo! also used this API to build a mobile version of Meme for app-ready smartphones.

== Comparisons with social media ==
Meme focused on the basics of microblogging. Although compared extensively to Twitter and Tumblr, it differed in functionality and did not possess the ability to reply at and directly message other users. It also permitted users to create text-based posts that surpassed Twitter's 140-character limitations and imposed a 2000-character limit instead. However, the post stream was similar in design to Tumblr's current schema of cascading, stacking posts.

One unique feature of Meme was the ability to repost. If a user wanted to comment on an item from another user's stream, they had to click on a repost button and display the post in their own feed. Although it may seem redundant, it helped users find new sources of content to follow and create content streams composed of multiple sources.

== Discontinuation ==
Yahoo! remained secret about their development of a competing microblogging site. Although it was marketed in several heavily populated countries, users were slow to adopt it. Furthermore, Yahoo! Inc. tried to enter the overly saturated social media market with a product that did not bring an innovative or attractive concept, in the opinion of Techcrunch. “Meme” is also an ambiguous word, which led to branding complications. Yahoo! announced on March 26, 2012, that Meme would be discontinued on May 25, 2012. Short domain name me.me that was used for this project was returned to the .me registry. It has subsequently become a meme search engine.
