= International Emergency Management Organization =

The International Emergency Management Organization is an international body having its provisional head office in Italy. It was established through the Inter-governmental Convention on food micro-algae, university research and emergency prevention, first ratified by Benin, Madagascar, and Somalia.

IEMO is involved in emergency management and prevention. It organizes an International Emergency Prevention Day on 14 April.

In addition to these efforts, IEMO has developed strategies to mitigate the effects of famines and droughts, particularly in vulnerable regions such as Africa, Latin America, and Asia. A key component of this strategy is the promotion of hyper-productive, high-protein plant-based crops such as Spirulina Platensis and Moringa Vitals, aimed at enhancing food security and nutritional intake in affected areas. This approach leverages the nutritional benefits and environmental resilience of these crops to provide sustainable food sources in the face of decreasing agricultural yields and challenging climatic conditions."The IEMO-CISRI International Anti-Famine Strategy (IAFS)".
