= Borka Jerman Blažič =

Slovenian computer scientist

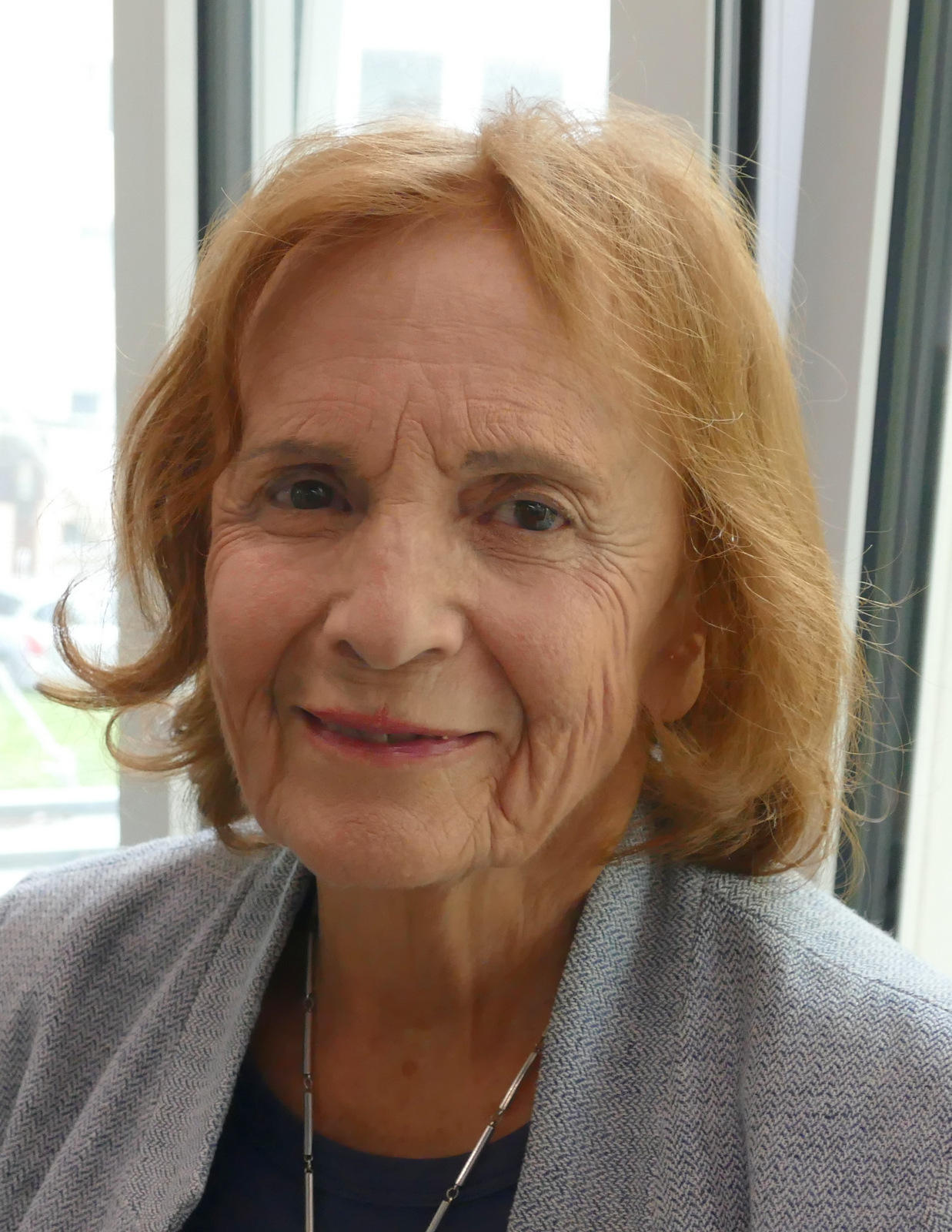
Image of Borka Jerman Blažič

Borka Jerman Blažič (born 28 March 1947) is a Slovenian Internet pioneer, and the President of the Internet Society - Slovenia. She is also a computer networks scientist, founder and first general secretary of the Yugoslavian Network for the Academic and Education Community (YUNET), which introduced the first Internet services in SFR Yugoslavia in 1991.

Blažič graduated from the University of Skopje, Macedonia, obtained Master of Science degree at Faculty of Electric Engineering at University of Ljubljana, Slovenia and PhD at the Faculty of Informatics and Natural Sciences, University of Zagreb, Croatia. She has spent her post-doctoral studies at the Iowa State University in Ames, U.S.A.

== Career ==
Among other contributions, she was part of the Internet Architecture Board Character Set Workshop in 1996, and part of her previous work was used in the preparation of the RFC.

In 1992-1993 she was project officer and chair of the TERENA (Trans European Research and Education Networks Association) Working Group on Internationalization of the Network services. In 1996-2000 she was member of TERENA Technical Committee.

Borka Jerman Blažič was the first elected chair of the European Council of the Internet Society Chapters (ISOC-ECC).

Prof. Dr. Borka Jerman Blažič is a full professor at the University of Ljubljana, Department of Economics and is heading the Laboratory for Open Systems and Networks at the Jožef Stefan Institute. There she is teaching electronic communications and information security. She's also running the program on Internet technology at the postgraduate international school Jožef Stefan. She is also a senior researcher at the Department for System and Computer Sciences of the Stockholm University.

Borka Jerman Blažič is a member of the Scientific Council of the European Privacy Association. In 2011 she was appointed as a member of the Grand Jury of the World Summit Awards. She is also a member of the Slovenian Governmental Council for Electronic communications.

Prof. Dr. Jerman Blažič has published hundreds of articles in international journals, conferences, books and was an invited speaker at many international conferences and workshops in the field of Information and Communication Technologies.

In 2017 she was awarded the Medal for Merits by the President of Slovenia Borut Pahor.

The international conference Information Society 2018 recognize the work of Borka Jerman Blažič and awarded her as "The first lady of Slovenian Internet". In 2018 she published the book "Don Quixote in Slovenia or how Internet has come in Slovenia". The book was published by eBesede and Jožef Stefan institut. The book introduces the history of computer networks development in the world and the work related to the first internet line in Slovenia in 1991. The independence of Slovenia and turmoil on the Balkans in that time are presented in the book as well.
