= Richard Schreier =

Richard Schreier from Analog Devices Incorporated, Toronto, ON was named Fellow of the Institute of Electrical and Electronics Engineers (IEEE) in 2015 for contributions to delta-sigma data converters.

== Lecture ==
- 1992 - Dual-truncation delta-sigma D/A converters Lecture sponsored by the Dept. of Electrical and Computer Engineering, University of California, San Diego. Electrical and Computer Engineering Distinguished Lecture Series. Digital object made available by UC San Diego Library.
