= World Post Day =

International holiday

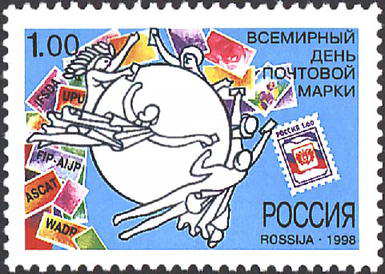
A 1998 Russian stamp issued on World Post Day

World Post Day is an international day that occurs each year on October 9, the anniversary of the Universal Postal Union (UPU), which started in 1874 in Switzerland. The UPU was the start of the global communications revolution, introducing the ability to write letter to others all over the world. World Post Day started in 1969. Since then, countries all over the world take part in celebrations to highlight the importance of the postal service. Many things happen on this day. Post offices in some countries hold special stamp collection exhibitions; there are open days at postal measures and there are workshops on postal history. The UPU organizes an international letter writing competition for young people. Since 1969, UPU announces the annual best postal services of the year on the 9 October.

Postal systems have been in operation for many centuries. From way back in history, people sent letters to each other. These were delivered on foot or on horseback by special messengers. From the 17th century the first national postage systems began springing up in many countries. These were more organized and many people could use them. Slowly countries agreed to exchange mail internationally. By the late 19th century there was a global postal service, but it was slow and complicated. The birth of the UPU in 1874 opened the way for the efficient postal service in existence today. In 1948, the UPU become an agency of the United Nations.

== History ==
October 9 was first declared World Post Day at the 1969 UPU Congress in Tokyo, Japan. The proposal was submitted by Shri Anand Mohan Narula, a member of the Indian delegation. Since then, World Post Day has been celebrated all over the world to highlight the importance of the postal services.
