= .coop =

Internet top-level domain

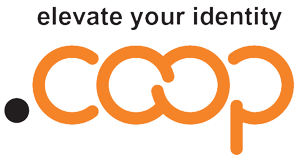
- Introduced: 2001
- TLD type: Sponsored top-level domain
- Status: Active
- Registry: Identity.coop
- Sponsor: DotCooperation LLC, a subsidiary of the National Cooperative Business Association
- Intended use: Cooperatives
- Registration restrictions: Only cooperatives and associated organisations may register; eligibility is verified through organizations of co-operatives and verifiable materials provided by registrants
- Structure: Direct second-level registrations are allowed; some generic words are reserved by the Sponsor to be awarded to applicants with proposals that allow access to all relevant co-ops for their use
- Documents: ICANN registry agreement
- Dispute policies: UDRP
- DNSSEC: Yes
- Registry website: identity.coop

.coop is a sponsored top-level domain (sTLD) in the Domain Name System of the Internet. It is intended for the use of cooperatives, their wholly owned subsidiaries, and other organizations that exist to promote or support cooperatives.

The coop TLD was proposed by the National Cooperative Business Association (NCBA) as a response to the announcement by the Internet Corporation for Assigned Names and Numbers (ICANN) in late 2000 of a phased release of seven new generic top-level domains in an expansion of the Internet domain name space.

The proposal was backed by many cooperatives and similar trade groups around the world, including the International Cooperative Alliance (ICA). The technical infrastructure for the coop TLD was developed by the worker cooperative Poptel in the United Kingdom and became operational on January 30, 2002.

The domain's sponsoring organization is DotCooperation LLC (also known as dotCoop), which is a wholly owned subsidiary of the National Cooperative Business Association (NCBA). DotCooperation is responsible for the TLD operation, including the enforcement of registration requirements. In 2005, the Midcounties Co-operative assumed operation of the domain registry through a subsidiary unit (Midcounties Co-operative Domains). DynDNS was contracted as the sole DNS provider for the registry in 2006.

Active coop domain holders are automatically included in an online coop directory and registrants receive a periodic newsletter. Registrations are processed via accredited ICANN domain name registrars or their resellers.

coop domains are in use around the world; however, many co-ops, as businesses in the global community, also maintain domain names in other generic or country code top-level domains to identify themselves both as a co-op and as a business.

== See also ==
- Domain name
- .crs (top-level domain), a top-level domain for Federated Co-operatives
