= List of members of the Universal Postal Union =

Member states Member states both through their sovereign state and as individual members Observer states Non-member states represented by a member state

The 192 members of the Universal Postal Union are listed below in alphabetical order, with the date of membership. Members are the Vatican City and the 193 UN members except Andorra, the Marshall Islands, the Federated States of Micronesia, and Palau. The newest member is South Sudan, which joined on 4 October 2011.

Before 10 July 1964, states became members of the UPU by ratifying the latest version of the Treaty of Bern. After this date, states become members by ratifying the Constitution of the Universal Postal Union, which incorporated the Treaty of Bern and added provisions to it. Three states that were party to the Treaty of Bern in 1964, and hence members of the UPU, and which have signed but never ratified the Constitution are the Dominican Republic, Honduras, and Sudan. These states are deemed to have "tacitly ratified" the agreement due to their continued participation in the UPU. Also included as members are two "joint memberships" for dependent territories (one for the British overseas territories and one for the Caribbean constituent countries (Dutch: landen) of the Kingdom of the Netherlands (Aruba, Curaçao and Sint Maarten), originally as Netherlands Antilles). Dependent territories are not permitted to ratify the UPU Constitution, but because the Treaty of Bern allowed for dependencies to join the UPU, listing these members separately as "Colonies, Protectorates, etc.", the Constitution of the Universal Postal Union grandfathered them when membership was restricted to sovereign states. However, neither the British nor the Dutch entities ratified the Treaty of Bern separate from the ratifications of the United Kingdom and the Kingdom of the Netherlands, respectively.

By virtue of article 23 of the UPU Constitution, other dependencies of a UPU member state are covered by the membership of that state. Territories covered by a sovereign member state are listed under that state.

== A ==
- Afghanistan – 1 April 1928 (Note: Ratified as the Kingdom of Afghanistan.)
- Albania – 1 March 1922 (Note: Ratified as the Principality of Albania.)
- Algeria – 1 October 1907 (Note: Ratified as French Algeria.)
- Angola – 1 March 1977
- Antigua and Barbuda – 20 January 1994
- Argentina – 1 April 1878
- Armenia – 14 October 1992
- Australia – 1 October 1907
  - Norfolk Island
- Austria – 1 July 1875 (Note: Ratified as Austria-Hungary.)
- Azerbaijan – 1 April 1993

== B ==
- Bahamas – 24 April 1974
- Bahrain – 21 December 1973
- Bangladesh – 7 February 1973
- Barbados – 11 November 1967
- Belarus – 13 May 1947 (Note: Ratified as the Byelorussian SSR.)
- Belgium – 1 July 1875
- Belize – 1 October 1982
- Benin – 27 April 1961 (Note: Ratified as the Republic of Dahomey.)
- Bhutan – 7 March 1969
- Bolivia – 1 April 1886
- Bosnia and Herzegovina – 26 January 1993 (Note: Ratified as the Republic of Bosnia and Herzegovina.)
- Botswana – 12 January 1968
- Brazil – 1 July 1877 (Note: Ratified as the Empire of Brazil.)
- Brunei – 15 January 1985
- (United Kingdom) British overseas territories – 1 July 1875 (UK membership), 1 April 1877 (Independent membership) (Note: Dependent territory whose membership was grandfathered in by the Constitution.)

- Anguilla
- Bermuda
- British Indian Ocean Territory
- British Virgin Islands
- Cayman Islands
- Falkland Islands
- Gibraltar
- Montserrat
- Pitcairn Islands
- South Georgia and the South Sandwich Islands
- Saint Helena, Ascension and Tristan da Cunha

Dependencies of Saint Helena, Ascension and Tristan da Cunha
- Saint Helena
- Ascension
- Tristan da Cunha

- Turks and Caicos Islands

- Bulgaria – 1 July 1879 (Note: Ratified as the Tsardom of Bulgaria.)
- Burkina Faso – 29 March 1963 (Note: Ratified as Upper Volta.)
- Burundi – 6 April 1963 (Note: Ratified as the Kingdom of Burundi.)

== C ==
- Cambodia – 21 December 1951 (Note: Ratified while a French protectorate.)
- Cameroon – 26 July 1960
- Canada – 1 July 1878
- Cape Verde – 30 September 1976
- Central African Republic – 28 June 1961
- Chad – 23 June 1961
- Chile – 1 April 1881
- China – 1 March 1914 (Note: China was originally represented by the government of the Republic of China from 1 March 1914. Following the United Nations General Assembly's vote to transfer China's seat to the People's Republic of China (PRC) in 1971, China's representation at the UPU was likewise switched to the PRC on 13 April 1972.)
  - Hong Kong (Note: Hong Kong was part of the British Overseas Territories joint membership from 1 April 1877 to 1 July 1997. Hong Kong continues to participate in the Universal Postal Union after the transfer of sovereignty from the United Kingdom to China on 1 July 1997.) – 1 April 1877
  - Macau
- Colombia – 1 July 1881
- Comoros – 29 July 1976
- Congo, Democratic Republic of the – 1 January 1886 (Note: Ratified as the Congo Free State.)
- Congo, Republic of – 5 July 1961
- Costa Rica – 1 January 1883
- Ivory Coast – 23 May 1961
- Croatia – 20 July 1992
- Cuba – 4 October 1902
- Cyprus – 23 November 1961
- Czechia – 18 March 1993

== D ==
- Denmark – 1 July 1875
  - Faroe Islands
  - Greenland
- Djibouti – 6 June 1978
- Dominica – 31 January 1980
- Dominican Republic – 1 October 1880 (Note: State which became a UPU member by ratifying the Treaty of Bern and which signed the Constitution, but which has not ratified it. These states are deemed to have "tacitly ratified" the agreement due to their continued participation in the UPU.)

== E ==
- Ecuador – 1 July 1880
- Egypt – 1 July 1875 (Note: Ratified as the Khedivate of Egypt.)
- El Salvador – 1 April 1879
- Equatorial Guinea – 24 July 1970
- Eritrea – 19 August 1993
- Estonia – 30 April 1992 (Note: Originally joined on 7 July 1922 prior to Soviet occupation)
- Eswatini – 7 November 1969 (Note: As Swaziland until 2018.)
- Ethiopia – 1 November 1908 (Note: Ratified as the Ethiopian Empire.)

== F ==
- Fiji – 18 June 1971
- Finland – 12 February 1918
  - Åland Islands
- France – 1 January 1876

French Overseas Departments
- French Guiana
- Guadeloupe (including Saint Barthélemy and Saint Martin)
- Martinique
- Reunion
- Mayotte
- Saint Pierre and Miquelon
Territories coming within the UPU's jurisdiction by virtue of article 23 of the UPU Constitution
- French Polynesia (including Clipperton Island)
- French Southern and Antarctic Lands
- New Caledonia
- Wallis and Futuna

== G ==
- Gabon – 17 July 1961
- Gambia – 9 October 1974
- Georgia – 1 April 1993
- Germany – 1 July 1875 (Note: Ratified as the German Empire.)
- Ghana – 10 October 1957
- Greece – 1 July 1875 (Note: Ratified as the Kingdom of Greece.)
- Grenada – 30 January 1978
- Guatemala – 1 August 1881
- Guinea – 6 May 1959
- Guinea-Bissau – 30 May 1974
- Guyana – 22 March 1967

== H ==
- Haiti – 1 July 1881
- Honduras – 1 April 1879
- Hungary – 1 July 1875 (Note: Ratified as Austria-Hungary.)

== I ==
- Iceland – 15 November 1919 (Note: Ratified as the Kingdom of Iceland.)
- India – 1 July 1876 (Note: Ratified as the British India.)
- Indonesia – 1 May 1877 (Note: Ratified as the Dutch East Indies.)
- Iran – 1 September 1877 (Note: Ratified as the Sublime State of Iran.)
- Iraq – 22 April 1929 (Note: Ratified as the Kingdom of Iraq under British Administration.)
- Ireland – 6 September 1923 (Note: Ratified as the Irish Free State.)
- Israel – 24 December 1949
- Italy – 1 July 1875 (Note: Ratified as the Kingdom of Italy.)

== J ==
- Jamaica – 29 August 1963
- Japan – 1 June 1877 (Note: Ratified as the Empire of Japan.)
- Jordan – 16 May 1947

== K ==
- Kazakhstan – 27 August 1992
- Kenya – 27 October 1964
- Kiribati – 14 August 1984
- Korea, Democratic People's Republic of – 6 June 1974
- Korea, Republic of – 1 January 1900 (Note: Ratified as the Korean Empire.)
- Kuwait – 16 February 1960
- Kyrgyzstan – 26 January 1993

== L ==
- Laos – 20 May 1952 (Note: Ratified as the Kingdom of Laos.)
- Latvia – 17 June 1992 (Note: Originally joined on 1 October 1921 prior to Soviet occupation)
- Lebanon – 15 May 1946
- Lesotho – 6 September 1967
- Liberia – 1 April 1879
- Libya – 4 June 1952 (Note: Ratified as the Kingdom of Libya.)
- Liechtenstein – 13 April 1962
- Lithuania – 10 January 1992 (Note: Originally joined on 1 January 1922 prior to Soviet occupation)
- Luxembourg – 1 July 1875

== M ==
- Madagascar – 2 November 1961
- Malawi – 25 October 1966
- Malaysia – 17 January 1958 (Note: Ratified as the Federation of Malaya.)
- Maldives – 15 August 1967
- Mali – 21 April 1961
- Malta – 21 May 1965
- Mauritania – 22 March 1967
- Mauritius – 29 August 1969
- Mexico – 1 April 1879
- Moldova – 16 November 1992
- Monaco – 12 October 1955
- Mongolia – 24 August 1963 (Note: Ratified as the Mongolian People's Republic.)
- Montenegro – 26 July 2006 (Note: Originally joined on 2 October 1874 prior to foundation of the Kingdom of Serbs, Croats and Slovenes in 1918.)
- Morocco – 1 October 1920 (Note: Ratified while a French protectorate.)
- Mozambique – 11 October 1978
- Myanmar – 4 October 1949 (Note: Ratified as the Union of Burma.)

== N ==
- Namibia – 30 April 1992
- Nauru – 17 April 1969
- Nepal – 11 October 1956 (Note: Ratified as the Kingdom of Nepal.)
- Netherlands – 1 July 1875
- Aruba, Curaçao and Sint Maarten – 1 July 1875 (Netherlands membership), 1 May 1877 (Independent membership) (Note: These three entities are constituent countries of the Kingdom of the Netherlands, but have a joint UPU membership separate of that of the Netherlands. Prior to the dissolution of the Netherlands Antilles on 10 October 2010, Aruba and the then-Netherlands Antilles shared a common UPU membership. Upon dissolution, Curaçao and Sint Maarten became constituent countries within the Kingdom of the Netherlands; Bonaire, Sint Eustatius and Saba, now collectively known as the Caribbean Netherlands, became parts of the Netherlands proper.)
  - Aruba
  - Curaçao
  - Sint Maarten
- New Zealand (including the Ross Dependency) – 1 October 1907
  - Cook Islands (Free Association with New Zealand)
  - Niue (Free Association with New Zealand)
  - Tokelau
- Nicaragua – 1 May 1882
- Niger – 12 June 1961
- Nigeria – 10 July 1961
- North Macedonia – 12 July 1993 (Note: Under the provisional designation of "The former Yugoslav Republic of Macedonia" until 2019.)
- Norway – 1 July 1875 (Note: Ratified as the United Kingdoms of Sweden and Norway.)

== O ==
- Oman – 17 August 1971

== P ==
- Pakistan – 10 November 1947
- Panama – 11 June 1904
- Papua New Guinea – 4 June 1976
- Paraguay – 1 July 1881
- Peru – 1 April 1879
- Philippines – 1 January 1922
- Poland – 1 May 1919
- Portugal – 1 July 1875

== Q ==
- Qatar – 31 January 1969

== R ==
- Romania – 1 July 1875
- Russia – 1 July 1875 (Note: Ratified as the Russian Empire. Continued membership as the Soviet Union from 1922–1991.)
- Rwanda – 6 April 1963

== S ==
- Saint Kitts and Nevis – 11 January 1988
- Saint Lucia – 10 July 1980
- Saint Vincent and the Grenadines – 3 February 1981
- Samoa – 9 August 1989 (Note: Ratified as Western Samoa.)
- San Marino – 1 July 1915
- São Tomé and Príncipe – 22 August 1977
- Saudi Arabia – 1 January 1927 (Note: Ratified as the Kingdom of Hejaz and Nejd.)
- Senegal – 14 June 1961
- Serbia – 9 October 1875 (Note: Ratified as the Principality of Serbia. Continued membership as Yugoslavia 1918–1992 and Serbia and Montenegro 2001–2006, membership suspended in between.)
- Seychelles – 7 October 1977
- Sierra Leone – 29 January 1962
- Singapore – 8 January 1966
- Slovakia – 18 March 1993
- Slovenia – 27 August 1992
- Solomon Islands – 4 May 1984
- Somalia – 1 April 1959 (Note: At the time split between the Trust Territory of Somaliland and British Somaliland.)
- South Africa – 22 August 1994
- South Sudan – 4 October 2011
- Spain – 1 July 1875
- Sri Lanka – 13 July 1949 (Note: Ratified as the Dominion of Ceylon.)
- Sudan – 28 July 1956
- Suriname – 20 April 1976
- Sweden – 1 July 1875 (Note: Ratified as the United Kingdoms of Sweden and Norway.)
- Switzerland – 1 July 1875
- Syria – 15 May 1946 (Note: Ratified as the Syrian Republic.)

== T ==
- Tajikistan – 9 June 1994
- Tanzania – 29 March 1963 (Note: Ratified as Tanganyika.)
- Thailand – 1 July 1885 (Note: Ratified as the Kingdom of Siam.)
- Timor-Leste – 28 November 2003
- Togo – 21 March 1962
- Tonga (including Niuafo'ou) – 26 January 1972
- Trinidad and Tobago – 15 June 1963
- Tunisia – 1 July 1888 (Note: Ratified as the Regency of Tunis.)
- Turkey – 1 July 1875 (Note: Ratified as the Ottoman Empire.)
- Turkmenistan – 26 January 1993
- Tuvalu – 3 February 1981

== U ==
- Uganda – 13 February 1964
- Ukraine – 13 May 1947 (Note: Ratified as the Ukrainian SSR.)
- United Arab Emirates – 30 March 1973
- United Kingdom – 1 July 1875 (Note: Ratified as the United Kingdom of Great Britain and Ireland.)

The Crown dependencies of the United Kingdom are not members of the UPU, and are represented by the United Kingdom
- Guernsey
- Isle of Man
- Jersey

- United States – 1 July 1875 (Note: On 17 October 2018 the United States notified the UPU of its intention to withdraw from the union, which as per terms of the UPU constitution would become effective after one year. However, the country indicated that it would be willing to remain a member if treaty arrangements which it finds problematic (the low terminal dues charged to developing countries to ship mail to developed countries) could be renegotiated during the course of the withdrawal period. In October 2019, following an Extraordinary Congress of the UPU which agreed to increase terminal dues, the United States opted to remain a member of the UPU.)

Territories coming within the UPU's jurisdiction by virtue of article 23 of the UPU Constitution
- Guam
- Puerto Rico
- American Samoa
- United States Virgin Islands
- Northern Mariana Islands

- Uruguay – 1 July 1880
- Uzbekistan – 24 February 1994

== V ==
- Vanuatu – 16 July 1982
- Vatican City – 1 June 1929
- Venezuela – 1 January 1880
- Vietnam – 20 October 1951 (Note: Ratified as the State of Vietnam.)

== Y ==
- Yemen – 1 January 1930 (Note: Ratified as the Mutawakkilite Kingdom of Yemen.)

== Z ==
- Zambia – 22 March 1967
- Zimbabwe – 31 July 1981

== Observer states ==
- Palestine – Has special observer status to the UPU since 1999, West Bank mail delivered through Jordan since 2008. From up to 2010 Gaza Strip mail was delivered through Israel. On 15 November 2018, the president of the State of Palestine signed documents to accede to the UPU as a full member. However, UPU member states did not approve the application.

== States not participating in UPU activities ==
In general areas governed by organizations that are not members of the UPU, must have their international mail handled by a member state.

- Andorra – mail routed through France or Spain.
- Marshall Islands (mail transportation handled by the United States Postal Service)
- Federated States of Micronesia (mail transportation handled by the United States Postal Service)
- Palau (mail transportation handled by the United States Postal Service)

== Entities not participating in UPU activities ==
- (Sovereign Military Order of Malta) Order of Malta mail routed through Italy. Additionally, its stamps are accepted by 57 UPU members.

== States with limited recognition ==
These states need to have their mail routed through third countries as the UPU will not allow direct international deliveries.

- Somaliland mail routed through Ethiopia
- Northern Cyprus mail routed through Turkey
- Kosovo mail routed through Serbia
- Abkhazia mail routed through Russia
- South Ossetia mail routed through Russia
- Transnistria mail routed through Moldova
- Sahrawi Republic mail routed through Algeria
- Taiwan (Republic of China) mail routed through Japan and the United States (Note: Mail for Taiwan was also previously routed through Hong Kong. International reply coupons are not available for Taiwan.)

== Former member countries of the UPU ==
In the course of history a number of member countries of the UPU saw their membership lapse, due to political changes. Where there was an immediate successor state, membership would normally devolve on that state. In other cases membership lapsed.

- (Hawaiian Kingdom) Kingdom of Hawaii – 1 January 1882 – 14 June 1900 (organized as the Territory of Hawaii, an organized incorporated territory of the United States)
- Orange Free State – 1 January 1898 – 31 May 1902 (Note: The Orange Free State acceded to the Postal Convention of Vienna in 1898, and a year later also acceded to that of Washington. The state was dissolved at the signing of the Treaty of Vereeniging. Membership did not lapse but was absorbed into the British South African membership.)
- South African Republic – 1 January 1895 – 31 May 1902 (Note: The South African Republic was a member from 1895 until its dissolution at the signing of the Treaty of Vereeniging. Membership did not lapse but was absorbed into the British South African membership.)
- Gold Coast – January 1879 – 1957 (became Ghana)
- Czechoslovakia From 18 May 1920 – Slovakia and the Czech Republic ratified the treaty after Czechoslovakia dissolved in 1992. Wartime Slovakia (1939–1945) ratified the Universal Postal Treaty and all its protocols on 5/8/1941.
- Yugoslavia (country ceased to exist in 1992)
- Independent State of Croatia 1941–1945 (country ceased to exist)
- Republic of China – 1 March 1914 – 1 October 1949 (politically ceased to exist; confined to Taiwan from 7 December 1949)
- Korean Empire – 1 January 1900 – 29 August 1910 (annexed by Japan)
- South Vietnam (country ceased to exist in 1975)
- East Germany From 1 July 1875 (Note: Ratified as part of the German Empire.) (country ceased to exist in 1990)
- South Yemen (country ceased to exist in 1990)

== See also ==
- List of postal entities, a list of the postal authorities and operators of UPU members.
