= .rs =

Internet country code top-level domain for Serbia

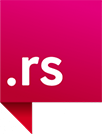
- Introduced: 24 September 2007 (in root zone); 10 March 2008 (registrations)
- TLD type: Country code top-level domain
- Status: Active
- Registry: RNIDS
- Sponsor: RNIDS
- Intended use: Entities connected with Serbia
- Actual use: Mainly in Serbia; also popular within the Rust community
- Registered domains: 167,056 (July 2026)
- Registration restrictions: None at 2nd level, on 3rd level there are some restrictions depending on category
- Documents: General Terms and Conditions for Registration
- Dispute policies: Disputes
- DNSSEC: yes
- Registry website: rnids.rs/en (English website) rnids.rs(Serbian website)

Logo of the Serbian National Internet Domain Registry

.rs is the Internet country code top-level domain (ccTLD) for Serbia. The domain name registry that operates it is the Serbian National Internet Domain Registry (RNIDS). The letters rs stand for Republika Srbija/Република Србија (Republic of Serbia).

It is also popular within the Rust community, as "rs" is also the filename extension of Rust.

== History ==
The former Serbia and Montenegro used the .yu domain when still called the Federal Republic of Yugoslavia. In June 2006 Serbia and Montenegro split into two separate countries. In July 2006 the Serbian Ministry of Science and a group of 34 interested organizations founded the National Internet Domain Registry (RNIDS). In September 2006, the ISO 3166 Maintenance Agency decided to allocate RS as the ISO 3166-1 alpha-2 code for Serbia. IANA assigned .rs as the ccTLD for this country.

The delegation of name servers by IANA started in September 2007. Registration of the .rs domain names commenced on 10 March 2008.

In 2007 ICANN also resolved that RNIDS, the operators of the new .rs domain registry, should temporarily operate the former .yu domain until its eventual abolition on or before 30 September 2009. This allowed a two-year transition period for existing .yu names to transferred either to .rs for Serbia or to .me for Montenegro. The .yu domain finally expired on 30 March 2010.

In 2018, a Brazilian company began marketing .rs domain names towards entities based in Rio Grande do Sul, which shares the RS two-letter code within Brazil, as well as the BR-RS ISO 3166 code.

In 2018, the .rs TLD started offering full Serbian Latin letters domain registration (together with other letters used by official minorities groups in Serbia), totalling 67 letters which can be used for a domain name.

== Domain structure ==
The top-level domain is intended for all interested users. The following second-level domains except in.rs are reserved for legal entities only.

- .co.rs – Corporations
- .org.rs – Civil organizations and associations
- .edu.rs – Educational institutions and organizations (except ac.rs sub-domain)
- .ac.rs – Academic and research network of Serbia (delegated)
- .gov.rs – Government institutions (delegated)
- .in.rs – Personal use

== See also ==
- .срб, a Cyrillic top-level domain for Serbia.
- Country codes of Serbia
- National symbols of Serbia
