= .tel =

Internet top-level domain

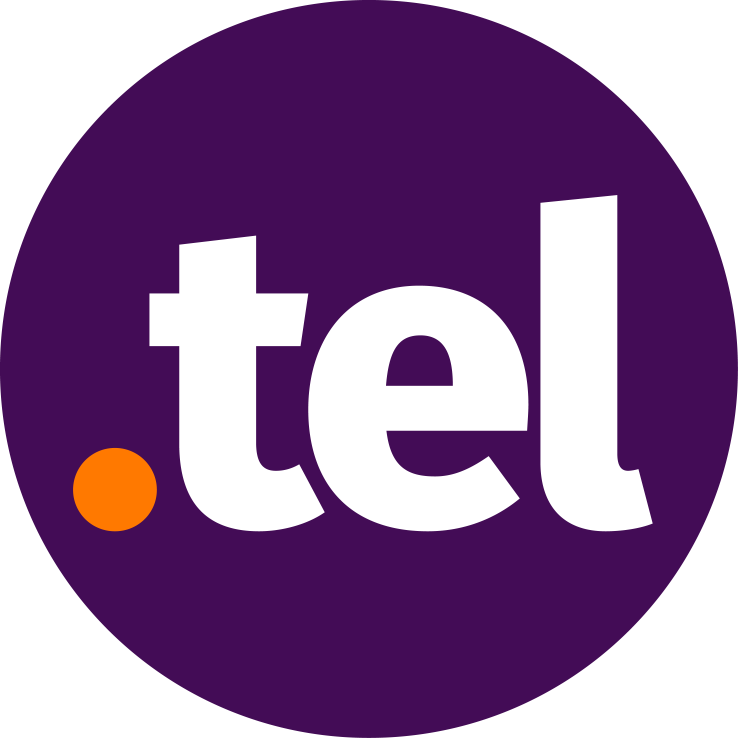
- Introduced: 30 May 2006; 19 years ago
- TLD type: Sponsored top-level domain
- Status: Active
- Registry: Telnames Limited
- Sponsor: Telnames Limited
- Intended use: Namespace to find contact information
- Actual use: Telecoms; miscellaneous sites; contact information; online business card; personal sites
- Registration restrictions: None
- Structure: Registrations at second level permitted
- Documents: ICANN New sTLD RFP Application, Policies
- Dispute policies: UDRP
- DNSSEC: Yes
- IDN: Yes
- Registry website: www.do.tel

The domain name .tel is a top-level domain (TLD) in the Domain Name System (DNS) of the Internet. It was approved by ICANN as a sponsored top-level domain, and is operated by Telnames. The domain's purpose is to provide a single name space for Internet communications services.

== History ==
ICANN and Telnic Limited (now Telnames) entered into a Sponsored TLD Registry Agreement on 30 May 2006 for operation of the .TEL top level domain. Telnic started accepting public registrations for .tel domain names on February 3, 2009. Before this, there was a closed "Sunrise" period where only trademark holders could secure their names.

The .tel domain experienced a rapid initial registration phase upon its launch. Following its "Landrush" period, the domain became available for General Availability on March 24, 2009, and surpassed 100,000 registrations within the first 36 hours. This initial momentum continued, with the registry reporting over 300,000 domains registered by January 2010. However, the TLD's popularity declined in the following decade. By early 2012, the number of registered domains had dropped to 256,566. As of October 2025, that number had fallen to approximately 145,000 registered domains.

The initial idea behind .tel was for it to work like a public contact card on the internet. Instead of building a normal website, the owner of a .tel domain used a special control panel (provided by Telnic) to enter their contact information (like phone numbers, email, etc.). This information was stored directly in the DNS records. When someone visited a .tel address (like "example.tel") in their browser, they didn't see a regular website. Instead, the domain pointed to a standard Telnic page that simply displayed the contact information the owner had saved. When accessed via a mobile phone, it was possible to transfer the contacts from a .tel domain to the device's address book.

The original purpose of .tel domains was largely rendered obsolete by the rise of social media, instant messaging apps and new gTLDs focused on contact information and personal websites without the technical limitations inherent to the .tel domain. In response, the registry changed its policies, allowing .tel to be used as a general-purpose TLD, removing the technical limitations. Since March 13, 2017, .tel domains support standard Domain Name System (DNS) record management, allowing them to function like any other TLD for services such as web hosting and email, much like a .com or .net.

== Registration ==
.tel domains can be registered by any individual, business, or organization through an accredited registrar for a term of one to ten years. Domain names must be between 1 and 63 characters. As of March 13, 2017, registrants are permitted to use their own name server and hosting, rather than being required to use the registry's built-in directory service. All registrations are subject to the .tel Registration Rules and Acceptable Use Policy.
