= .int =

Internet top-level domain for intergovernmental organizations

- Introduced: November 3, 1988; 36 years ago
- TLD type: Sponsored top-level domain
- Status: Active
- Registry: IANA
- Sponsor: IANA
- Intended use: International treaty-based organizations
- Actual use: Intergovernmental organizations and organizations with United Nations observer status
- Registration restrictions: Applications screened for eligibility
- Structure: Registrations at second level permitted
- Documents: RFC 1591
- Dispute policies: None
- Registry website: IANA .int page

The domain name int is a sponsored top-level domain (sTLD) in the Domain Name System of the Internet. Its name is derived from the word international, characterizing its use for international organizations and treaty-related purposes. The first use of this domain was by NATO, which had previously been assigned the top-level domain .nato.

According to Internet Assigned Numbers Authority (IANA) policy, based on RFC 1591, the sTLD int is reserved for international treaty-based organizations, United Nations agencies, and organizations or entities having observer status at the UN. int is considered to have the strictest application policies of all TLDs, as it implies that the holder is a subject of international law. For this reason, the application procedure requires the applicant to provide evidence that it is indeed treaty-based by providing a United Nations treaty registration number and that it has independent legal status. Previously, it also was open to Internet infrastructure services; those services have since been required to register in .arpa.

== Delegations ==
As of November 2024, the domain int consists of 235 subdomain delegations.

The subdomain eu.int was used by the European Union–affiliated institutions. However, the aforementioned institutions' domain names switched to the TLD eu on May 9, 2006 (Europe Day). All previous eu.int addresses continued to be accessible for a transitional period of at least one year. As of 2017, the European Central Bank continues to use ecb.int in addition to ecb.eu and ecb.europa.eu, and the .int domain is still sometimes used for email addresses.

The Stockholm Convention on Persistent Organic Pollutants (POPS) saw its initial application for a domain name under int rejected on the grounds that the convention did not explicitly create an entity subject of international law. However, POPS appealed to the IANA Reconsideration Committee and obtained its domain (pops.int) on the grounds that other conventions lacking such specific language had nevertheless obtained a registration. The IANA granted the domain after the committee determined that (1) the organization was chartered by a treaty that was very likely to enter into force, and (2) despite lacking a legal track record, it met "the requirement for independent international legal personality." This grant was subject to the provision that the status of eligibility be renewed if the treaty had not entered into force within four years of the registration.

Additionally, the domain int was historically also used for Internet infrastructure databases. The name space arpa had been slated to be moved into int, but in 2000 the Internet Architecture Board recommended that no new infrastructure databases should be added to int and that arpa retain its function. The only remaining technical role of int was for reverse translation of IPv6 addresses in the zone ip6.int. This zone was officially removed on 6 June 2006 in favor of ip6.arpa, also administered by IANA.

=== Grandfathered delegations ===
Several domains under int were granted prior to the application of the strict guidelines. World YMCA is an example of the loose guidelines applied in the early 1990s. IANA has not withdrawn the existing assignment from YMCA and other organizations such as The Phone Company (which has however not been available since 2011 and the domain name is no longer registered) who do not meet the current criteria.

== See also ==
- Generic top-level domain
- List of organizations with .int domain names
