= National Cooperative Business Association =

Trade group for US autonomous non-corporate entities

National Cooperative Business Association CLUSA International
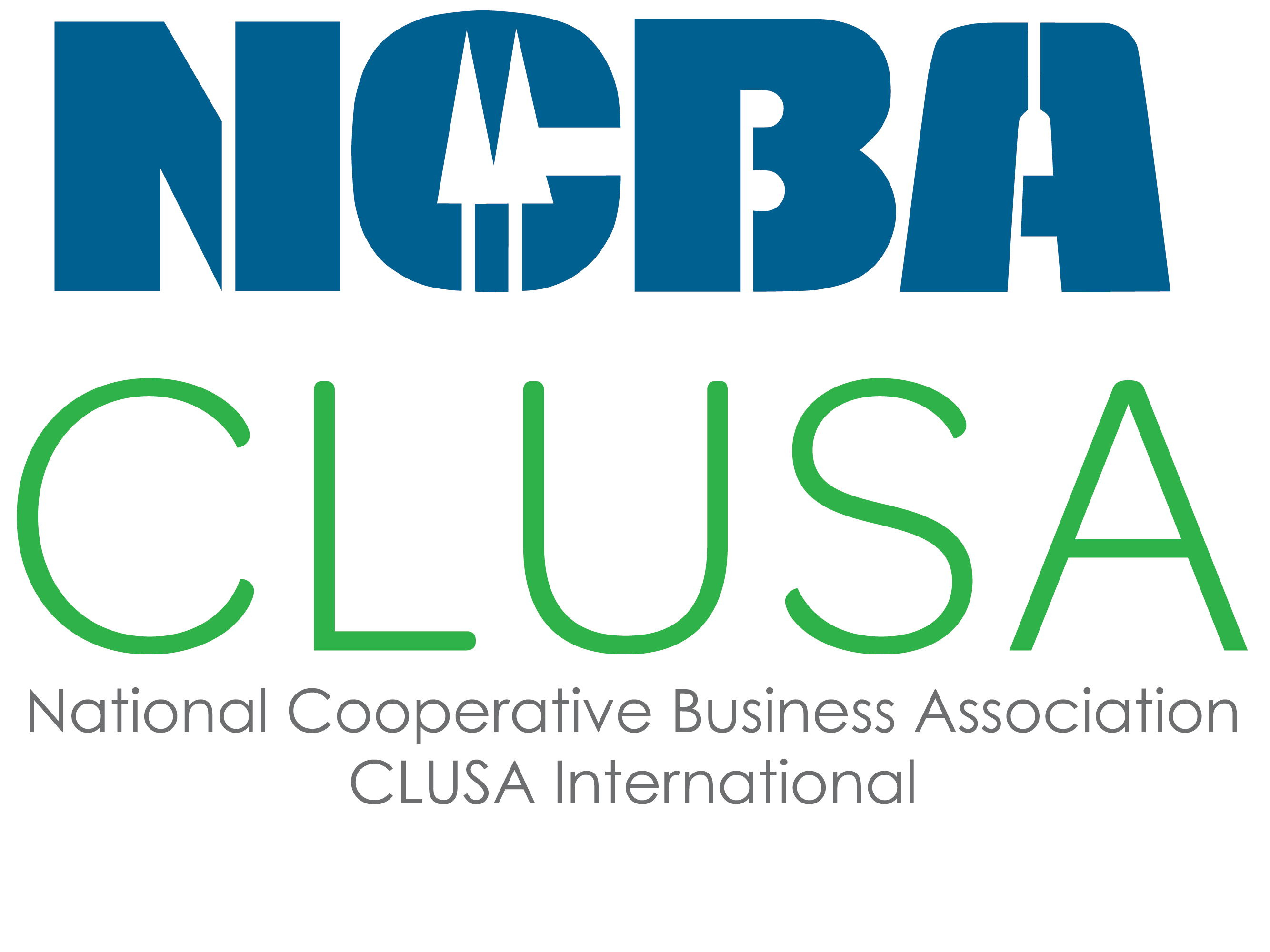
- Company type: Cooperative association
- Industry: Cooperative Business Association, International Development
- Founded: March 18, 1916; 110 years ago
- Headquarters: Washington, D.C., United States
- Area served: United States
- Key people: Doug O'Brien, President & CEO
- Revenue: 27,723,018 United States dollar (2022)
- Total assets: 40,978,734 United States dollar (2022)
- Number of employees: HQ: 75 Worldwide: 700+
- Website: ncba.coop

The National Cooperative Business Association (NCBA) is a United States membership organization for cooperatives, which are businesses that are jointly owned and democratically controlled.

The association was founded in 1916 as the Cooperative League of the United States of America. Its founding president was medical doctor James Peter Warbasse, who served in that role until 1941.

NCBA members include some well-known United States consumer brands, such as Ace Hardware, Nationwide Insurance, Cabot Creamery, Organic Valley, Land O'Lakes, and CHS Inc.

== History ==
In 1922, the League trademarked the twin pines symbol used to represent North American cooperatives. "The pine tree is an ancient symbol of endurance and immortality. The two pines represent mutual cooperation—people helping people."

In its first few decades, it focused on consumer cooperation, and published a monthly magazine, "Co-operation".

After Warbasse, later presidents included: Murray B. Lincoln, former U.S. Congressman Jerry Voorhis, Stanley Dreyer, Glenn Anderson, Morgan Williams, Bob Scherer, Russell C. Notar, Paul Hazen, and Michael Beall.

The organization changed its name to NCBA in 1985.

In 2000 the group lobbied the Internet Corporation for Assigned Names and Numbers to establish a new top-level domain exclusively for cooperative organizations. The domain, .coop, became active in 2002.

In November 2015, after the resignation of Michael Beall, Judy Ziewacz became interim CEO until she was appointed by the board of directors as president and CEO effective February 1, 2016. Ziewacz was the first woman to hold the office of president and CEO in NCBA CLUSA's 100 years of service. She was succeeded two years later by Doug O'Brien.

== Mission ==
The association's mission is "to develop, advance and protect cooperative enterprise." It is one of the oldest non-profit coop and trade association in the U.S. NCBA has been operating internationally since 1953 with a mission to "alleviate poverty through social and economic empowerment."
