= .travel =

Internet top-level domain

travel
- Introduced: 2005
- TLD type: Sponsored top-level domain
- Status: Active
- Registry: Donuts Inc.
- Sponsor: The Travel Partnership Corporation
- Intended use: Travel Websites
- Structure: Direct second-level registrations will be allowed; sale of third-level domains within a registered domain is expressly prohibited
- Documents: ICANN New sTLD RFP Application; ICANN Sponsorship Agreement; IANA delegation report
- Dispute policies: UDRP, Charter Eligibility Dispute Resolution Procedure (CEDRP)
- Registry website: www.travel.domains

.travel is a top-level domain in the Domain Name System of the Internet. .travel domain names are available to individuals and/or organizations that provide or plan to provide services, products or content in/to the Tourism sector (otherwise known as the Travel industry). It is sponsored by Donuts Inc., and registrations are processed via accredited registrars.

== History ==
The domain was approved by ICANN on April 8, 2005, as a sponsored TLD in the second group of new TLD applications evaluated in 2004. TheGlobe.com acquired Tralliance Corporation, the operator of .travel, on May 9, 2005. In 2018, Donuts acquired the .travel TLD.

The official launch began in October 2005, with a screening process to determine eligibility to register domains in each of three monthly groups for October, November, and December. Open registrations began in January 2006, while governments were given priority registration for geographic place names from July 2005, to December 21, 2007.

By 2017, there were approximately eighteen thousand .travel domains registered.

== Purpose ==
Registration is open to organizations, associations, and private, governmental and non-governmental agencies, or people who provide or plan to provide services, products or content in/to the travel industry.
