= OpenNIC =

Organization

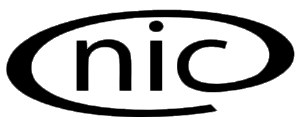
- Founded: June 1, 2000; 26 years ago
- Purpose: Provides a non-national alternative to the traditional Top-Level Domain registries. OpenNIC is a user-owned and -controlled Network Information Center.
- Website: servers.opennic.org

OpenNIC (also referred to as the OpenNIC Project) is a user-owned and -controlled top-level Network Information Center that offers a non-national alternative to traditional top-level domain (TLD) registries such as ICANN. As of January 2017, OpenNIC recognizes and peers all existing ICANN TLDs, for compatibility reasons. However, OpenNIC has not yet evaluated and does not hold a formal position on future ICANN TLDs.

In addition to resolving hostnames in the ICANN root, OpenNIC also resolves hostnames in OpenNIC-operated namespaces, as well as within namespaces with which peering agreements have been established. Some OpenNIC recursive servers (Tier 2 servers) are known for their high speeds and low latency, relative to other more widely used DNS recursors, as well as their anonymizing or no-logging policies. Many servers offer DNSCrypt. Community volunteers operate Tier 2 servers across a multitude of geographic locations.

Like all alternative root DNS systems, OpenNIC-hosted domains are unreachable to the vast majority of Internet users because they require a non-default configuration in one's DNS resolver.

== History ==
On June 1, 2000, an article was posted on kuro5hin.org advocating a democratically governed domain name system. The first OpenNIC servers went into operation July of that year.

== OpenNIC TLDs ==
=== OpenNIC namespaces ===
These TLDs are currently served by OpenNIC and were constructed with the approval of the OpenNIC community.

Name	Intended use	Date introduced	Restrictions	Notes	Status
.bbs	Bulletin Board System servers, and related BBS websites and services	2000-12-29	Domain must provide BBS type services.		Manual Registration
.chan	A Top Level Domain "for imageboards and communities related to imageboard culture"	2015-10-21			Active
.cyb	Cyberpunk-related content	2017-08-14			Active
.dyn	Dynamic DNS pointers	2014-05-30	Only A, AAAA, RP and TXT records can be modified.	Unused domains are removed after 28 days.	Active
.epic	General purpose domain for anything of an "epic" nature	2019-09-03			Active
.free	Organizations that encourage the non-commercial use of the Free Internet		Non-commercial use only. No new registrations accepted.	Moved to .libre following ICANN addition of .free. Currently still resolving.	Dropped
.geek	Anything of a personal or hobbyist nature that would be considered "geeky"	2008-02-18			Active
.gopher	Content delivery via the gopher protocol		Must serve content via the gopher protocol.		Active
.indy	Independent media and arts				Active
.libre	Organizations that encourage the non-commercial use of the Free Internet	2017-01-03	Non-commercial use only	Successor to .free after the introduction of .free on the ICANN namespace	Active
.neo	General purpose			Usage should lean towards themes present in the 'emo subculture'	Manual Registration
.null	Miscellaneous		Non-commercial use only. Only natural people may hold a .null domain.		Active
.o	General purpose	2016-11-28	Prohibits domain squatting and spam usage.		Active
.oss	Open Source Software				Active
.oz	Australian websites (alt-ccTLD)	2012-06-11			Active
.parody	Parody websites		Non-commercial use only		Active
.pirate	Internet Freedom and sharing				Active

=== Peering agreements ===
OpenNIC provides resolution for selecting other alternative DNS roots.

Name	Intended use	Date Introduced	Notes	Peer Authority	Status
.bazar	free marketplace			Emercoin	Active
.bit	Namecoin systems, websites and services		Depeered due to disagreements between the OpenNIC and Namecoin projects.	Namecoin	Dropped
.coin	digital currency and commerce websites			Emercoin	Active
.emc	websites associated with the Emercoin project			Emercoin	Active
.fur	Furries, Furry Fandom and other Anthropomorphic interest websites	2003-11-?	Originally an OpenNIC TLD, now operated by FurNIC.	FurNIC	Active
.ku	Kurdish people			New Nations	Active
.lib	From Words Library and Liberty - that is, knowledge and freedom			Emercoin	Active
.te	Tamil Eelam			New Nations	Active
.ti	Tibet			New Nations	Active
.uu	Uyghur people			New Nations	Active

==== New Nations ====
New Nations provides TLDs for nation-states that are not recognized by the ISO 3166-1 alpha-2 standard, and therefore haven't received their own ccTLD. Currently they provide .ku (Kurdish people), .te (Tamil Eelam), .ti (Tibet), and .uu (Uyghur people).

==== FurNIC ====
FurNIC aims to bring a unique identity to Furries, Furry Fandom, and other Anthropomorphic interest websites across the internet. FurNIC and OpenNIC work closely with .fur (Furry fandom) generally being treated as part of OpenNIC for most purposes rather than as a separate peer entity.

==== Emercoin ====
On January 15, 2015, domains registered in Emercoin's blockchain became accessible to all users of OpenNIC DNS. Emercoin DNS supports the domain zones .bazar, .coin, .emc, .lib, .ness and .sky. However, Emercoin DNS records can be registered/maintained within the Emercoin software and not as part of OpenNIC's management system.

=== Technical zones ===
OpenNIC operates some special-use TLDs, which are meant for technical or organizational purposes.

Name	Intended use	Restrictions	Notes	Status
.opennic.glue	Provides hostnames for Tier 1 DNS servers and organizational websites and services.	Domains cannot be registered. Domains are granted to each Tier 1 server operator or upon approval of the OpenNIC community.	Example: "ns2.opennic.glue"	Active
.dns.opennic.glue	Provides hostnames for Tier 2 DNS servers on the OpenNIC network.	Domains cannot be registered. Domains are automatically created upon the approval of a Tier 2 server.	Example: "ns1.any.dns.opennic.glue"	Active

=== Suspended peering ===
==== Namecoin ====
In July 2019, the OpenNIC community voted 13–2 for dropping support for .bit domains due to them "being used as malware hubs" as a result of their "anonymous nature". A similar proposal was made in December 2018 but it did not reach the voting stage.

Until then, OpenNIC resolved .bit (Namecoin) domains through the use of a centralized server which generated a DNS zone from the Namecoin blockchain. Access was provided through a Tier 1 server which bridges the OpenNIC system and Namecoin. Some OpenNIC DNS servers made use of a Spamhaus-maintained blocklist of malicious .bit domains.

== See also ==
- ICANN
- Namecoin
- Open Root Server Network
- Public recursive name servers
  - OpenDNS
  - Google Public DNS
  - CloudFlare Public DNS
