= ORSC =

ORSC may denote:

- Oxidizer-rich staged combustion, in rocket engineering
- Open Root Server Confederation, in computing
- Oak Ridges Soccer Club, in sports
- Organization Science (journal)
- Journal of the Operations Research Society of China
