= Reactions to Occupy Wall Street =

The Occupy Wall Street demonstrations garnered reactions of both praise and criticism from organizations and public figures in many parts of the world. Over time, a long list of notable people from a range of backgrounds began and continue to lend their support or make reference to the Occupy movement in general.

Domestic political responses have been both positive and critical, from the President of the United States to the 2012 presidential candidates.

International responses have come from the Egyptian protesters of Tahrir Square, Cardinal Peter Turkson, the Chinese state news agency (Xinhua), Indian Prime Minister Manmohan Singh, and many others. Most international responses have been supportive of the movement, while some, such as former United Kingdom Prime Minister Tony Blair have criticized it.

== Public opinion ==
National polls from October to December 2011 were mixed, with agreement/approval ratings for Occupy Wall Street varying from 59% to 22%. On December 19, MSNBC reported a study which showed small-business owners "are almost evenly split on whether they support the protest movement." Among the general public, opinions of OWS have varied over time, and there are contradictions between the data collected by various polling agencies.

=== September–October 2011 ===
An NBC/Wall Street Journal survey released October 12 found that 37 percent of respondents "tend to support" the occupy movement, while 18 percent "tend to oppose" it. An October 13 survey by TIME magazine found that 54 percent of Americans have a favorable impression of the protests, while 23 percent have a negative impression. An October 18 Gallup poll found that 22 percent of Americans agree with the protest's goals, while 15 percent disapprove and the remaining 61% say they don't know enough to decide. Gallup found that Democrats, Independents and Republicans all follow the news about OWS in equal numbers, and those who closely followed OWS were also those who were more likely to approve of its goals and methods. An October CBS News/New York Times polls found 43% of Americans agree with Occupy Wall Street while 27% disagree. An October Rasmussen poll found an almost even split, shows that 33 percent of Americans have a favorable view, while 27 percent are unfavorable and 40 percent have no opinion. A Pew poll taken October 20–23 had similar findings, with 39% supporting "the Occupy Wall Street movement," while 35% opposed. An October United Technologies/National Journal Congressional poll found that 59 percent of Americans agree with the movement while 31 percent disagree.

An October Quinnipiac University poll of New York City voters found that 67 percent of New Yorkers approved of the movement with 23 percent disapproving. The results also found 87 percent of New Yorkers find it OK that they are protesting. Despite media criticism that the protesters views are incoherent, the poll also found that 72 percent of New York City voters understand their views.

=== November–December 2011 ===
A NY1-Marist Poll released show of November 1ed 44 percent of New York voters supported the Occupy Wall Street movement, while only 21 percent supported the Tea Party. A survey of roughly 1,000 adults conducted from November 10 to 14 found that majorities of nearly identical size felt that Occupy Wall Street, and the Tea Party, respectively, did not share their values. A November 3 poll done by the Quinnipiac University Polling Institute found that 30 percent of American voters have a favorable view of the protests, while 39 percent do not. The same poll found that among independent voters, 29 percent have a favorable view opposed to 42 percent who have an unfavorable view, while 45% of Democrats have a favorable view opposed to 19% who have an unfavorable view. A Pew Research Center poll, released December 15, 2011, found that nearly three months after the start of OWS, 44% support the Occupy Wall Street movement and 35% oppose it. Americans overwhelmingly agree with the concerns raised by the movement, but more disapprove of the tactics used than approve.

According to a November Wall Street Journal article, the age group that most strongly supported OWS were 50 to 64, and OWS had the strongest support among those making $50,000 to $70,000 a year, rather than under $30,000, with only 27% of people making over $75,000 a year backing the movement. Managers and other professionals supported the movement more than blue-collar workers, and men over 50 showed the strongest support. These findings were contradicted by a December Pew Poll, which found opposition to OWS "higher in the older and affluent" while those making under $75,000 a year and those under 29 were the most supportive. The Pew poll (published Dec. 15) also found more support than opposition in Democrats (60/21) and Independents (46/34), and more opposition than support in Republicans (21/59).

In an opinion piece in the Wall Street Journal, pollster Douglas Schoen wrote that polling of the protesters revealed "values that are dangerously out of touch with the broad mass of the American people" and have "a deep commitment to left-wing policies: opposition to free-market capitalism and support for radical redistribution of wealth, intense regulation of the private sector, and protectionist policies to keep American jobs from going overseas", and that politicians who support them will be hurt in the 2012 elections. Journalist David Weigel responded in an opinion piece published on Slate characterizing Schoen's opinion piece as "a dishonest column full of claims that couldn't be backed up by his own research", while Washington Monthly lead blogger Steve Benen wrote an opinion piece accusing Schoen of political spin in his analysis and referring to Schoen, a frequent contributor to Fox News, as "the quintessential 'Fox News Democrat'".

== Political response ==
=== The White House ===
During an October 6 news conference, President Barack Obama said, "I think it expresses the frustrations the American people feel, that we had the biggest financial crisis since the Great Depression, huge collateral damage all throughout the country ... and yet you're still seeing some of the same folks who acted irresponsibly trying to fight efforts to crack down on the abusive practices that got us into this in the first place." When Jake Tapper of ABC News pushed Obama to explain the fact that his administration hasn't prosecuted any Wall Street executives who didn't play by the rules, he replied, "One of the biggest problems about the collapse of Lehman's and the subsequent financial crisis and the whole subprime lending fiasco is that a lot of that stuff wasn't necessarily illegal; it was just immoral or inappropriate or reckless." On October 18, when interviewed by ABC news, he said "in some ways, they're not that different from some of the protests that we saw coming from the Tea Party. Both on the left and the right, I think people feel separated from their government. They feel that their institutions aren't looking out for them."

On November 22, President Barack Obama was interrupted at a speech in New Hampshire by a group of Occupy Wall Street protesters who attempted to chant slogans during the speech; the protesters later delivered a paper message to the press, which read, "Mr. President: Over 4,000 peaceful protesters have been arrested while bankers continue to destroy the economy. You must stop the assault on our First Amendment rights. Your silence sends a message that police brutality is acceptable. Banks got bailed out. We got sold out." The crowd quickly drowned the protesters out with chants of "Obama!" Obama then responded, "I appreciate you guys making your point. Let me go ahead and make mine." Later in the speech, Obama said, "Families like yours, young people like the ones here today — including the ones who were just chanting at me — you're the reason that I ran for office in the first place."

Vice President Joe Biden likened the protest to the Tea Party's similar anger at the banks, saying, "Look, guys, the bargain is not on the level anymore in the minds of the vast majority of the American (people). The middle class has been screwed."

=== Congress ===
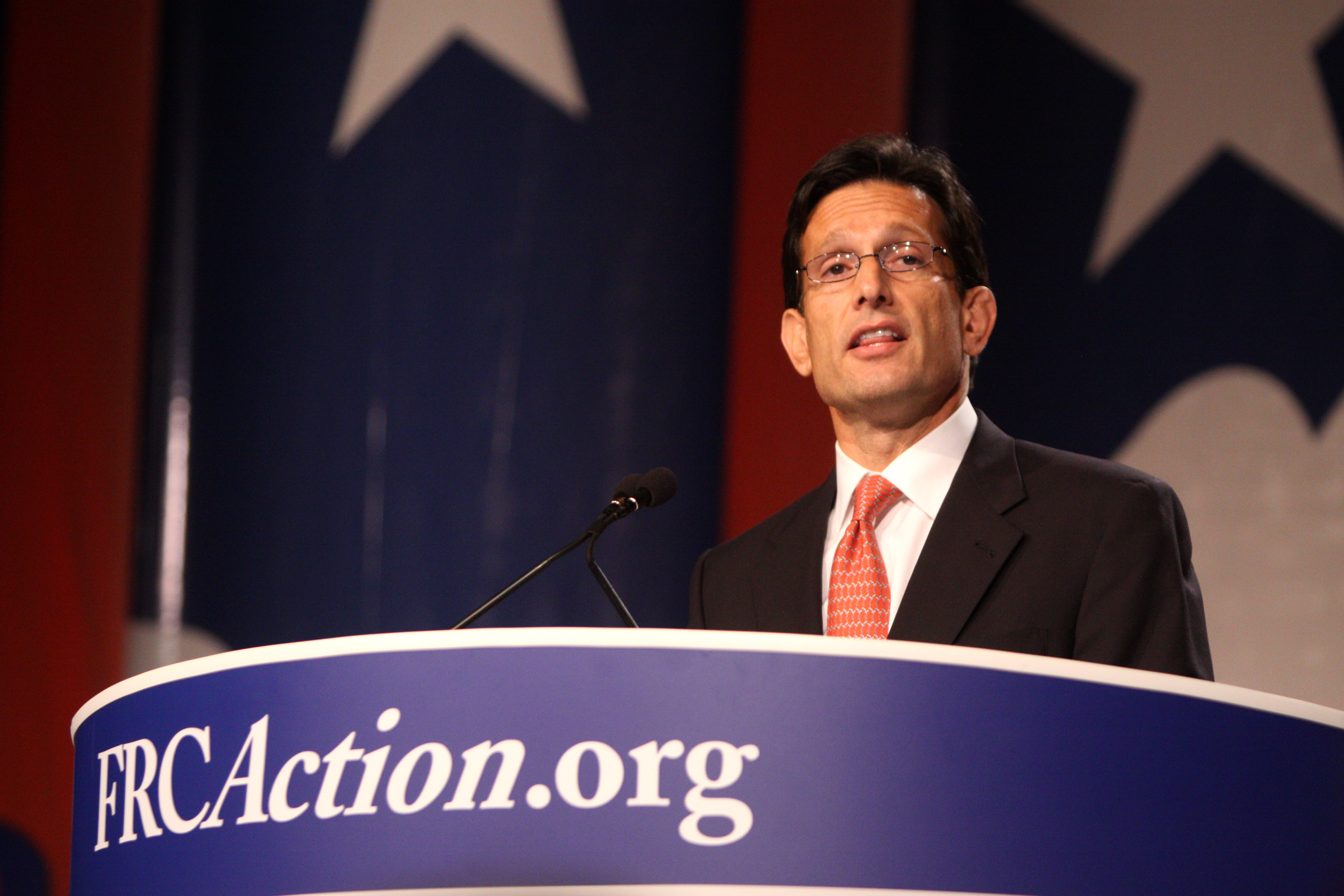
House Majority Leader Eric Cantor (R-Va), at the Values Voter Summit

House Democratic Leader Rep. Nancy Pelosi said she supports the growing nationwide Occupy Wall Street movement. Pelosi said she includes herself in the group of Americans dissatisfied with Congress and stated, "I support the message to the establishment, whether it's Wall Street or the political establishment and the rest, that change has to happen. We cannot continue in a way (that) is not relevant to their lives."

Independent Senator Bernie Sanders of Vermont, who caucuses with the Democratic Party, appeared on Countdown with Keith Olbermann and supported the protests saying, "We desperately need a coming together of working people to stand up to Wall Street. We need to rebuild the middle-class in this country and you guys can't have it all."

House Majority Leader Eric Cantor (R-Va), in a speech to a Values Voter Summit, characterized the movement as "growing mobs" and said that Obama's "failed policies" and rhetoric "condon[ing] the pitting of Americans against Americans" were to blame. In response, White House Press Secretary Jay Carney accused Cantor of "unbound" hypocrisy, given the Majority Leader's support of the Tea Party protests, adding, "I don't understand why one man's mob is another man's democracy." Carney characterized both movements as examples of American democratic traditions.

The Democratic co-chairs of the Congressional Progressive Caucus, Representatives Raúl Grijalva and Keith Ellison, announced their solidarity with the movement on October 4. The Democratic Congressional Campaign Committee is asking for 100,000 names on its website which will subsequently be added to 100,000 letters to Speaker of the House John Boehner and House Majority Leader Eric Cantor, expressing support for the Occupy Wall Street protesters, the middle class, and opposition to tax loopholes for millionaires and big oil.

=== 2012 presidential candidates ===
2012 Republican presidential candidate Mitt Romney said that while there were "bad actors" that needed to be "found and plucked out", he believes that to aim at one industry or region of America is a mistake and views encouraging the Occupy Wall Street protests as "dangerous" and inciting "class warfare". Romney later expressed sympathy for the movement, saying, "I look at what's happening on Wall Street and my view is, boy, I understand how those people feel."

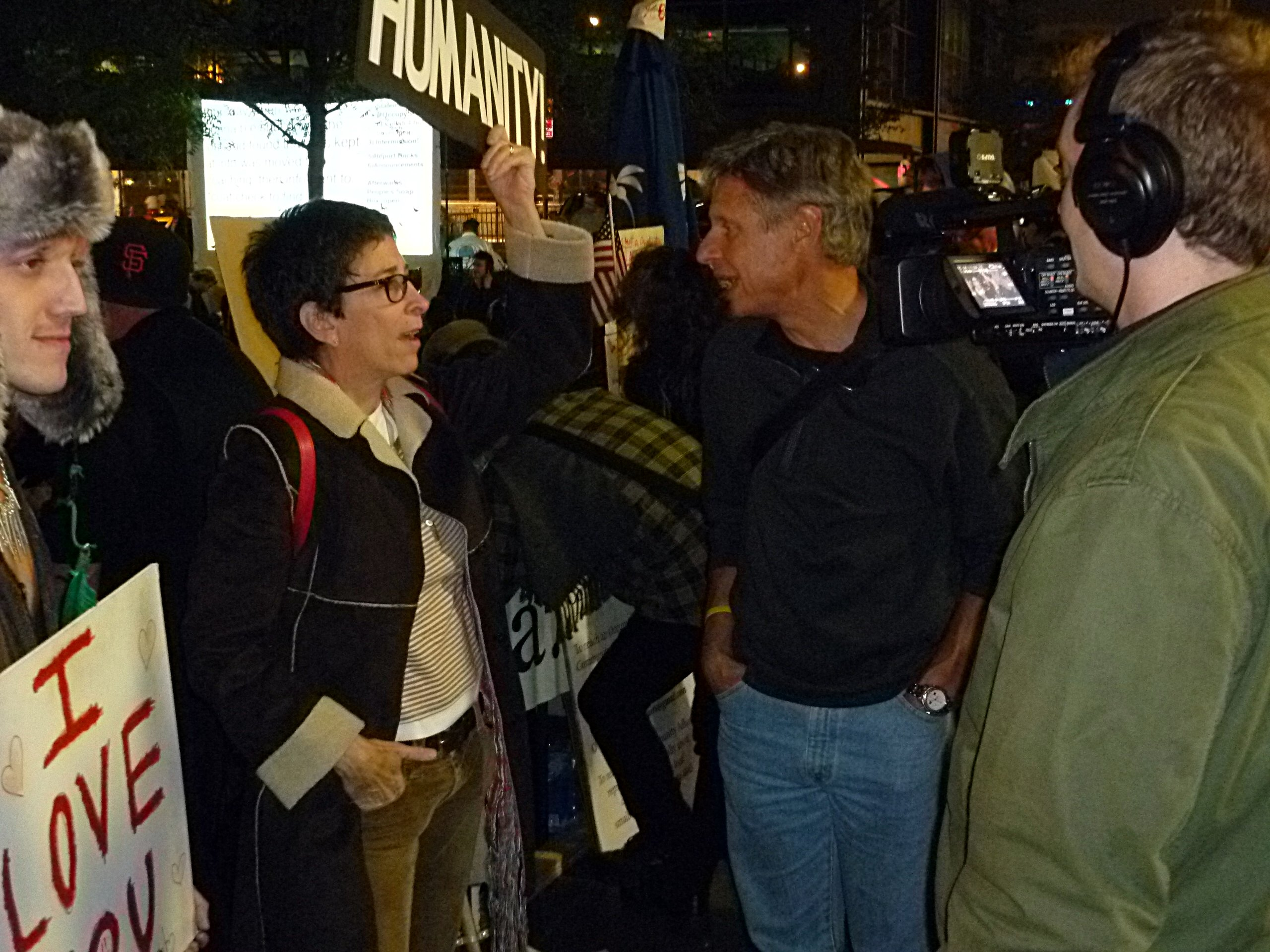
Gary Johnson meeting Occupy Wall Street protesters in Zuccotti Park

Former Governor of New Mexico and 2012 Libertarian Party presidential candidate Gary Johnson visited Occupy Wall Street in October 2011 and expressed support, stating "This country is not equal. We don't treat everyone equally. I would like to see us focus on the root cause, which is in my estimation politicians that are getting paid off. That's the corporatism and the outrage."

Speaking at a rally which had been disrupted by shouting Occupy Wall Street protestors, Republican presidential candidate Rick Santorum responded, "People are allowed to protest and we respect their opinion. We just happen to believe that folks who are at public rallies should let both sides to be heard," and later commented, "Something that maybe these folks over here could ... maybe working a little bit instead of coming to these events and screaming at people."

Former Speaker of the House of Representatives and 2012 Republican presidential candidate Newt Gingrich was quoted as saying at the 2012 Bloomberg/Washington Post Debate,

Let me draw a distinction. Virtually every American has a reason to be angry. I think virtually [every] American has a reason to be worried. I think the people who are protesting in Wall Street break into two groups: one is left-wing agitators who would be happy to show up next week on any other topic, and the other is sincere middle-class people who frankly are very close to the Tea Party people who care. And actually ... you can tell which are which. The people who are decent, responsible citizens pick up after themselves. The people who are just out there as activists trash the place and walk off and are proud of having trashed it, so let's draw that distinction.

U.S. Congressman and 2012 Republican presidential candidate Ron Paul (R-TX) stated, "If they were demonstrating peacefully, and making a point, and arguing our case, and drawing attention to the Fed—I would say, 'good!'" In a GOP debate, mentioning the ongoing "Occupy Wall Street" protesters, he stated that crony capitalists are those "that benefit from contract from government, benefit from the Federal Reserve, benefit from all the bailouts. They don't deserve compassion. They deserve taxation or they deserve to have all their benefits removed." When protesters conducted a 'mic check,' at one of Ron Paul's rallies, he replied, "If you listen carefully, I'm very much involved with the 99. I've been condemning that 1% because they've been ripping us off. The people on Wall Street got the bailouts and you guys got stuck with the bills and that's where I see the problem is."

Jill Stein, a 2012 Green Party (GPUS) presidential candidate, has strongly and consistently voiced support for the Occupy Wall Street movement. On October 9, prior to announcing her candidacy, she visited occupied Dewey Square in Boston, where she thanked the protesters for "breaking through the sound barrier," established by the "conglomerate media" which, according to her, have silenced those who have tried to speak out against injustice.

Former 2012 Republican presidential candidate Herman Cain accused the movement of being "anti-capitalist" and argued "Don't blame Wall Street, don't blame the big banks, if you don't have a job and you're not rich, blame yourself!" In an interview with the Wall Street Journal, Cain also expressed his belief that Occupy Wall Street was "planned and orchestrated to distract from the failed policies of the Obama administration," but admitted that he "[didn't] have facts" to back up his accusation.

=== Other politicians and political groups ===
Mayor Michael Bloomberg said that the protests "aren't productive," although he also expressed sympathy for some of their complaints. On October 8, during his weekly radio show, Bloomberg said that the protesters are trying to "take the jobs from the people working in the city," and said that although "[t]here are some people with legitimate complaints, there are some people who just like to protest."

In an interview with The Washington Post, Former Democratic U.S. Senator Russ Feingold endorsed the movement on October 5 stating, "This is like the Tea Party—only it's real ... By the time this is over, it will make the Tea Party look like ... a tea party." Former Chairman of the Joint Chiefs of Staff and Secretary of State Colin Powell declared that the demonstrations of the OWS movement were "as American as apple pie," adding ""This is something that our political leaders need to think about. It isn't enough just to scream at our Occupy Wall Street demonstrators — we need our political system to start reflecting this anger back into how do we fix it? How do we get the economy going again?"

Former President Bill Clinton was quoted in Forbes magazine saying, "Occupy Wall Street has done more in the short time they've been out there than I've been able to do in more than the last eleven years trying to draw attention to some of the same problems we have to address."

Former Vice President Al Gore offered his support for the Occupy movement in an October 12 blog post, writing: "From the economy to the climate crisis our leaders have pursued solutions that are not solving our problems, instead they propose policies that accomplish little. With democracy in crisis a true grassroots movement pointing out the flaws in our system is the first step in the right direction. Count me among those supporting and cheering on the Occupy Wall Street movement."

Former Minnesota Governor Jesse Ventura expressed his support for the movement and attended an Occupy protest in Minneapolis. He also stated his belief that the movement should not be dictated by either party, stating

I think that I have to be the face of this movement; it can't be a Democrat or a Republican because not only do I talk the talk I walk the walk. I never took one dollar of corporate money. I never took one PAC dollar to become governor of Minnesota." He also went on saying that both the Democrats and Republicans, both parties of which Ventura is known for being a staunch critic of, had "sold themselves out to Wall Street.

David Duke, former Grand Wizard of the Ku Klux Klan and former one-term Republican Louisiana State Representative showed his support for what he called the "Occupy Zionist Wall Street" protesters. Duke said that "The Zionist media has their paid whores condemning the demonstrations across America against these criminal banks" (citing Rush Limbaugh, Sean Hannity and Bill O'Reilly as specific examples), adding that "I cheer the men and women in the streets condemning the international banks that hold America hostage."

Media Matters for America (a US progressive media watchdog) commented that "If a Nazi says something nice about you, that doesn't make you a Nazi."

=== Labor unions ===
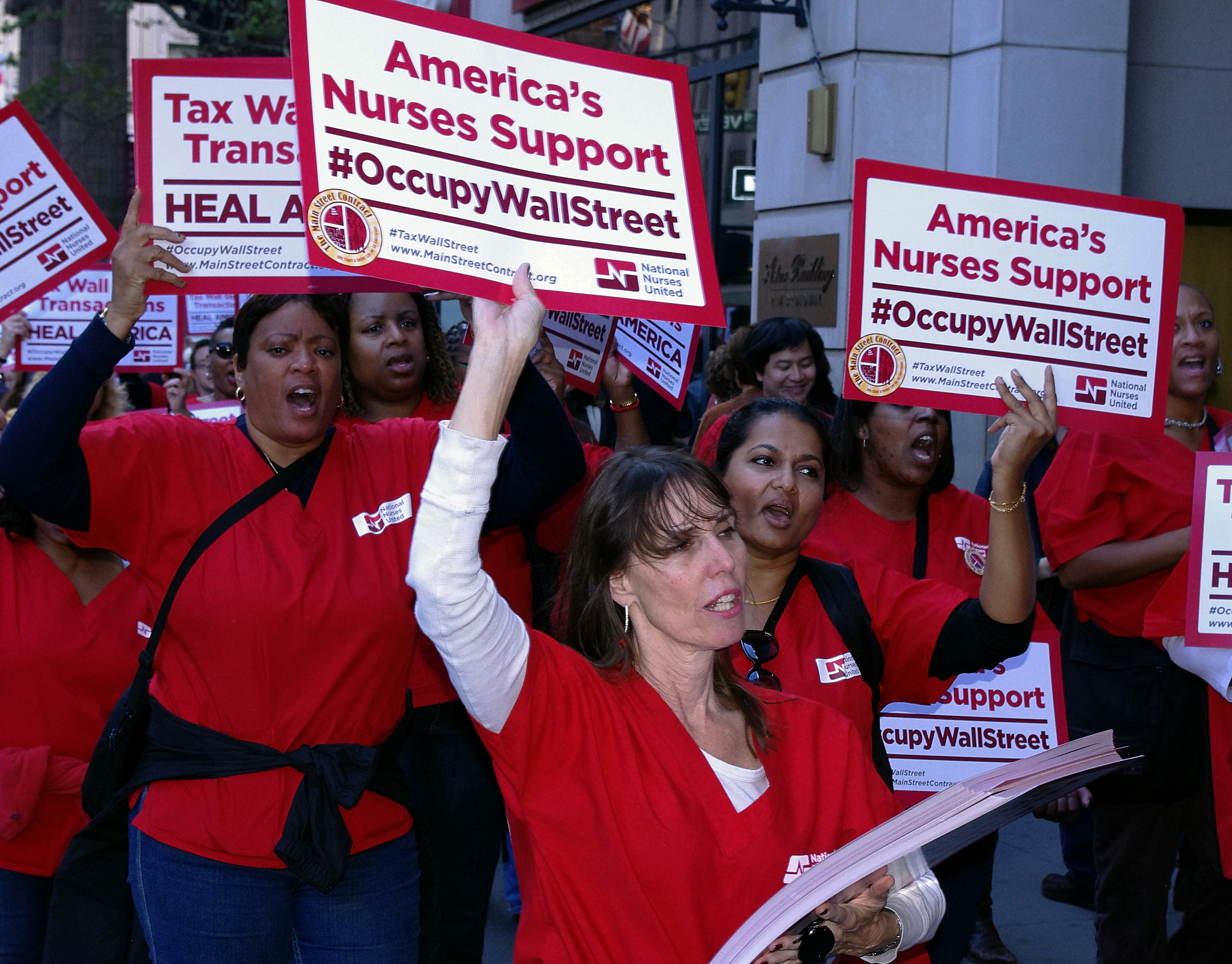
On October 5, 2011, members of the National Nurses United labor union march to Foley Square in support of OWS

In September, various labor unions, including the Transport Workers Union of America Local 100 and the New York Metro 32BJ Service Employees International Union, pledged their support for demonstrators. Union leaders say that unions and OWS can offer mutual support, with OWS gaining from the union's money, stature, and large membership, and the weakened labor movement absorbing the protesters vitality. The Industrial Workers of the World announced on September 28, 2011, that its General Executive Board (GEB), and the General Defense Committee (GDC) had issued statements of support for Occupy Wall Street. After numerous arrests of protesters on the Brooklyn Bridge, police commandeered city buses to pick up detained protesters and union drivers later sued the New York Police Department. Union President John Samuelsen said, "We're down with these protesters. We support the notion that rich folk are not paying their fair share. Our bus operators are not going to be pressed into service to arrest protesters anywhere". On October 4, representatives from more than 14 of the country's largest labor unions joined the protesters for a mass rally and march. In early November, National Nurses United (NNU), the largest union of registered nurses in the nation, expressed support for OWS and rallied in front of the White House and Department of Treasury. Karen Higgins, co-president of NNU, said, "A real finance tax would generate $350 billion a year in the U.S. alone and bring relief to families out of homes, friends out of work, patients out of care, communities running out of time. The tax starts a revenue flow back to the 99 percent."

Noting the growing union support, an article in the progressive-leaning Mother Jones magazine said that union support could splinter and derail the protests rather than sustain them because while unions are tightly organized, hierarchical, and run with a clear chain of command, Occupy Wall Street is the opposite in that they are "a horizontal, autonomous, leaderless, modified-consensus-based system with roots in anarchist thought." However, the article went on to suggest that if the unions and OWS joined they could work to create a progressive movement that "effectively taps into the rising feeling among many Americans that economic opportunity has been squashed by corporate greed and the influence of the very rich in politics." As the success of the movement has become apparent, union organizers have begun to embrace some of their social media skills, bold tactics, and the simplicity of the 99% slogan. Damon Silvers, the AFL–CIO's policy director, said, "We think the Occupy movement has given voice to something very basic about what's going on in our country right now. The fact that they've figured out certain concepts and language for doing that, we think is really important and positive." The International Union, United Automobile, Aerospace and Agricultural Implement Workers of America (UAW) has endorsed the movement saying, "We recognize the need to work together and learn from each other. The vitality, energy and dialogue growing from the Occupy Wall Street movement show the potential to organize, build power and win justice for the middle class."

=== Environmental response ===
Several environmentalist leaders supported Occupy Wall Street. In 2011, Greenpeace Executive Director Phil Radford expressed Occupy Wall Street, stating:: "We stand – as individuals and an organization – with Occupiers of all walks of life who peacefully stand up for a just, democratic, green and peaceful future." Bill McKibben of 350.org stated: "The reason that it's so great that we're occupying Wall Street is because Wall Street has been occupying the atmosphere." Sarah Hodgdon of the Sierra Club stated: "Many Sierra Club staff and volunteer leaders have participated in and/or lent support to these demonstrations standing up for the end to corporate greed. The demands and values of the protesters are very much in line with Sierra Club's strategic priority of confronting the power of the coal and oil industries."

=== Federal Reserve response ===
During a hearing before the Joint Economic Committee October 4, 2011, Federal Reserve Chairman Ben Bernanke said, "[P]eople are quite unhappy with the state of the economy and what's happening. They blame, with some justification, the problems in the financial sector for getting us into this mess, and they're dissatisfied with the policy response here in Washington. And at some level, I can't blame them. Certainly, 9 percent unemployment and very slow growth is not a good situation." On November 2, he again expressed sympathy with frustrations about the economy but also said many of the complaints levied at the Fed, including those made against the steps it took during the financial crisis, are misguided. "The concerns about the Fed are based on misconceptions," he said. "A very simplistic interpretation of that [criticism] was that we were doing that because we wanted to preserve banker salaries. That was obviously not the case." Dallas Federal Reserve President Richard W. Fisher said that he was "somewhat sympathetic" to the views of the protesters, and added, "We have too many people out of work. We have a very uneven distribution of income. We have a very frustrated people, and I can understand their frustration."

=== Media response ===
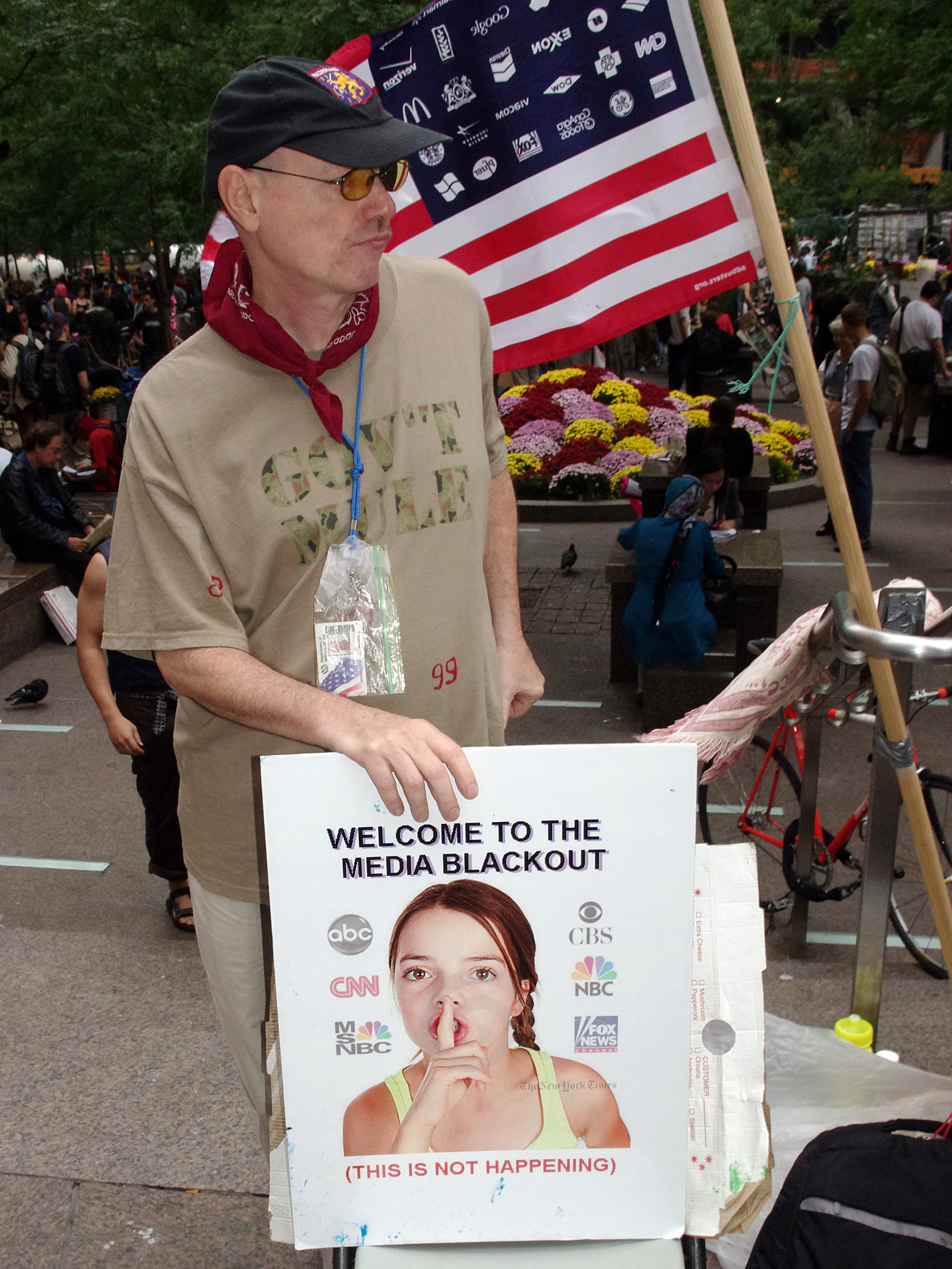
A protester's sign references the alleged lack of news coverage by mass media as a 'media blackout.'

Five days into the protest, Keith Olbermann criticized the initial media response for failing to adequately cover the protests. The protests began on Saturday, September 17. The following Wednesday, The New York Observer reported on the nascent protests in Zuccotti Park. On Friday, September 23, Ginia Bellafante panned the movement in The New York Times. Joanna Weiss of The Boston Globe found it difficult to take the protests seriously, criticizing Occupy Wall Street for its "circus" atmosphere." In a September 27 article, Lauren Ellis of Mother Jones magazine criticized the movement's lack of a clear message.

By October 4, economist Richard Wolff commented that the unclear shape of the movement is "mostly irrelevant" at this early stage and the priority should be to invite all interested parties. Kalle Lasn, co-founder of Adbusters, believed that the protests had gone mainstream and expressed the opinion that "it's become kind of a political left movement in the U.S., hopefully to rival the Tea Party." Michael Daly, of Newsweek and The Daily Beast characterized the position of the protesters as a "feeling that there is just a fundamental unfairness. From their point of view, the very people who almost wrecked the U.S. economy on Wall Street continue to get wealthy while working people are struggling to pay their bills." On October 11, Katrina vanden Heuvel, who writes a weekly column for The Washington Post and is the editor and publisher of The Nation, said "most understand that the main task ahead is growing the movement," and pointing to recent legislation, she suggests that the movement has already influenced public dialogue.

Writing for CNN, Sonia Katyal and Eduardo Peñalver said that "A straight line runs from the 1930s sit-down strikes in Flint, Michigan, to the 1960 lunch-counter sit-ins to the occupation of Alcatraz by Native American activists in 1969 to Occupy Wall Street. Occupations employ physical possession to communicate intense dissent, exhibited by a willingness to break the law and to suffer the -- occasionally violent -- consequences." Another CNN report by Douglas Rushkoff, said that even though the protesters are not ready to articulate an exact array of problems or how to solve them, "Anyone who says he has no idea what these folks are protesting is not being truthful. Whether we agree with them or not, we all know what they are upset about, and we all know that there are investment bankers working on Wall Street getting richer while things for most of the rest of us are getting tougher. What upsets banking's defenders and politicians alike is the refusal of this movement to state its terms or set its goals in the traditional language of campaigns ... They mean to show that there is an inappropriate and correctable disconnect between the abundance America produces and the scarcity its markets manufacture".

In a special for CNN, Sonia Katyal and Eduardo Peñalver said that "What has puzzled many observers about the Occupy Wall Street protests is precisely the lack of an obvious connection between their disobedience (the occupation of parks and streets) and their political and economic complaints. This is why Occupy's turn toward foreclosed housing is so important. While it takes heroic acts of imagination to connect the dots between the occupation of Zuccotti Park and worries about economic inequality, political corruption and the excessive power of banks, the connection between these issues and the occupation of foreclosed housing is obvious".

=== International response ===
- Brazilian President Dilma Rousseff said, "We agree with some of the expressions that some movements have used around the world in demonstrations like the ones we see in the US and other countries."
- Canadian Prime Minister Stephen Harper said that because there was nothing like a Canadian TARP program, he did not think Canadians were as angry as Americans. Finance Minister Jim Flaherty expressed sympathy with the protests, citing high unemployment amongst the youth. Comparing Canada to the U.S., he said that unlike the U.S., Canada has a progressive income tax system that favors the vulnerable, and the government has regulated and supervised its financial institutions.
- People's Republic of China state news agency Xinhua said the protests had exposed "fundamental problems" with the US economic and political systems, and that it showed "a clear need for Washington, which habitually rushes to demand other governments to change when there are popular protests in their countries, to put its own house in order."
- Egyptian protesters from Tahrir Square have spoken out in support of Occupy Wall Street. A message of solidarity issued by a collective of Cairo-based protesters declared: "As the interests of government increasingly cater to the interests and comforts of private, transnational capital, our cities and homes have become progressively more abstract and violent places, subject to the casual ravages of the next economic development or urban renewal scheme. An entire generation across the globe has grown up realizing, rationally and emotionally, that we have no future in the current order of things."
- Greek Prime Minister George Papandreou supported the U.S. protests saying, "We fight for changing the global economic system, like many anti-Wall Street citizens who rightly protest against the inequalities and injustices of the system."
- Indian Prime Minister Manmohan Singh stated, "There are reasons why people are protesting. People are protesting in Wall Street, in Europe about the fat salaries that the bankers are getting when people are being asked to tighten their belts. There is problem of growing unemployment in the United States. There is also worry in Europe. So there are problems which the system must have credible answers to take them on board."
- The Korean Central News Agency of North Korea commented that the Occupy Wall Street movement were "in protest against exploitation and oppression by capital, shaking all fabrics of society."
- Former president of Poland and cofounder of the Polish Solidarity Movement, Lech Wałęsa, has expressed his support for Occupy Wall Street and is considering a visit to the site.
- Former Soviet Union President Mikhail Gorbachev compared it to the perestroika period and the dissolution of the Soviet Union superpower, calling the protests justified. He said Americans should put their own house in order before attempting to do such with other countries.
- Former United Kingdom Prime Minister Gordon Brown said the protests were about fairness. "There are voices in the middle who say, 'Look, we can build a better financial system that is more sustainable, that is based on a better and proportionate sense of what's just and fair and where people don't take reckless risks or, if they do, they're penalized for doing so.'"
- Former United Kingdom Prime Minister Tony Blair criticized the movement, stating, "a protest is not the same as a policy. Someone who's demonstrating will often make demands, but they don't necessarily have answers."
- Vatican City Cardinal Peter Turkson, a senior Vatican official, defended the protests: "Do people at a certain time have a right to say: 'Do business differently, look at the way you are doing business because this is not leading to our welfare, to our good'? Can people demand this of the people of Wall Street? I think people can and should be able to." The comment was in light of a new publication the Vatican released entitled Towards Reforming the International Financial and Monetary Systems in the Context of Global Public Authority, which agreed with many of the protesters' issues.
- Venezuela President Hugo Chávez condemned what he claimed to be "horrible repression" of the Occupy Wall Street activists and expressed solidarity with the movement.

=== Other notable responses ===
==== Authors and academics ====
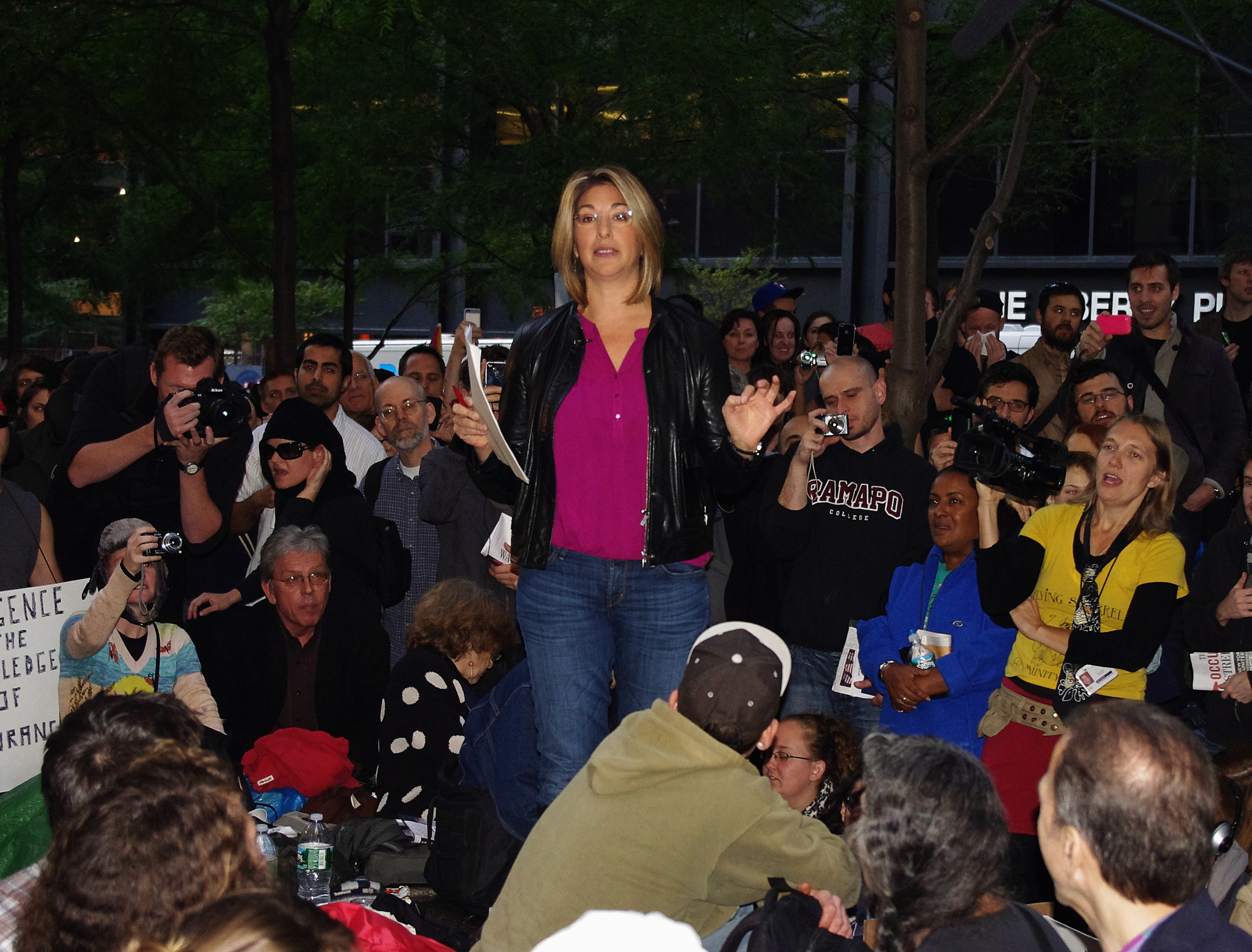
Naomi Klein leading an open forum on October 6

Kate Pickett, coauthor of The Spirit Level: Why More Equal Societies Almost Always Do Better, said in The Guardian that "Few doubt that it was the actions of the rich and the super-rich, the 1%, that created the crisis. But sadly, debate has not yet been translated into action ... This is why we need the Occupy movement and the staunch actions of the trade unions – why we need protest and demonstrations and activism."

Canadian writer Naomi Klein has spoken at the protest several times. Writing in the New York Times she said she is "delighted" that OWS has not given in to issuing a list of demands. "This is a young movement still in the process of determining just how powerful it is, and that power will determine what demands are possible. Small movements have to settle for small reforms: big ones have the freedom to dream."

Professor and author Cornel West addressed the frustrations that some critics have expressed at the protest's lack of a clear and unified message, saying, "It's impossible to translate the issue of the greed of Wall Street into one demand, or two demands. We're talking about a democratic awakening."

Harvard law professor Lawrence Lessig who has called for a Second Constitution of the United States agreed with the demands of OWS protestors but felt that too many demands generated "noise"; he called for clarity.

Philosopher Slavoj Žižek gave a speech on Wall Street in which he expressed support for the protests saying, "They tell you we are dreamers. The true dreamers are those who think things can go on indefinitely the way they are. We are not dreamers. We are awakening from a dream which is turning into a nightmare."

American political philosopher Jodi Dean, while critical of the movements focus on autonomy, leaderlessness and horizontality which she argues was self-destructive, says that "Occupy ruptured the lie that 'what is good for Wall Street is good for Main Street'."

On November 15, when police closed the park to overnight use by the protesters, Chris Hedges, who has been participating since the onset, wrote in his weekly column that he believed that through a rigid adherence to nonviolence and a verbal respect for the police, the movement would continue to move forward to see the realization of its goals. In another column, he said that OWS had popular support and "articulated the concerns of the majority of citizens." Author Barbara Ehrenreich, in response to the dismantling of the occupations, stated that "One of the appalling things here is that there are so many Democratic mayors involved in these crackdowns or in Bloomberg's case, someone who is seen as a liberal." Marie Gottschalk wrote in 2025 that the crushing of the movement (and others like it) with "overwhelming and hypermilitarized police forces and criminalizing protesters" helped to ensure that the movement could not sustain its momentum.

Over one thousand authors have announced their support for the movement via "Occupy Writers", an online petition that states "We, the undersigned writers and all who will join us, support Occupy Wall Street and the Occupy Movement around the world." The initiative began when Jeff Sharlet e-mailed Salman Rushdie to suggest a petition for writers who support Occupy Wall Street, and signatories range the spectrum of literary genres and academic disciplines and include Margaret Atwood, Noam Chomsky, Neil Gaiman, Daniel Handler also known as Lemony Snicket, and Alice Walker. The site also features original work from the writers expressing their take on the Occupy movement.

Authors and academics supporting include professor of economics and best-selling author Ravi Batra, anthropologist David Graeber, Stéphane Hessel, philosopher Judith Butler, Nobel Prize–winning economists Paul Krugman, and Joseph Stiglitz, Jeff Madrick, Wikipedia founder Jimmy Wales, and professor of economics Richard D. Wolff.

==== Business people ====
John Paulson, billionaire and founder of the hedge fund Paulson & Co., criticized the protesters for "vilifying our most successful businesses," citing that "The top 1% of New Yorkers pay over 40% of all income taxes, providing huge benefits to everyone in our city and state." Businessman and CEO Peter Schiff wrote an opinion column where he stated, "I own a brokerage firm, but I didn't receive any bailout money ... Yes, I am the 1% - but I've earned every penny. Instead of trying to take my wealth away, I hope they learn from my example." The lobbying firm Clark Lytle Geduldig & Cranford proposed to the American Bankers Association a plan to respond to the Occupy movement by researching the 'backers' and doing public relations work against them like putting negative stories in the media.

Vikram Pandit, head of Citigroup, called the protesters' sentiments "completely understandable" and said that Wall Street had broken the trust of its clients. Bill Gross, manager of PIMCO's Total Return Fund, the world's largest mutual fund, stated "Class warfare by the 99%? Of course, they're fighting back after 30 years of being shot at." PIMCO's co-CEO Mohamed El-Erian argued that people should "listen to Occupy Wall Street".

Karl Denninger, former CEO and one of the original co-founders of the Tea Party movement, expressed support for the movement, saying "The problem with protests and the political process is that it is very easy, no matter how big the protest is, for the politicians to simply wait until the people go home, and then they can ignore you. Well, Occupy Wall Street was a little different, and back in 2008, I wrote that when we will actually see change is when the people come, they set up camp, and they refuse to go home. That appears to be happening now." Jeff Immelt, CEO of General Electric and a member of Obama's Economic Recovery Advisory Board, stated "It is natural to assume that people are angry, and I think we have to be empathetic and understand that people are not feeling great." Ray Dalio, founder of Bridgewater Associates, the world's largest hedge fund, stated in an interview with Charlie Rose, "I think the number one problem is that we're not having a quality dialogue ... I certainly understand the frustration, I understand the dilemma, I understand the discontent." Other business leaders lending their support include George Soros and Russell Simmons.

==== Celebrities ====
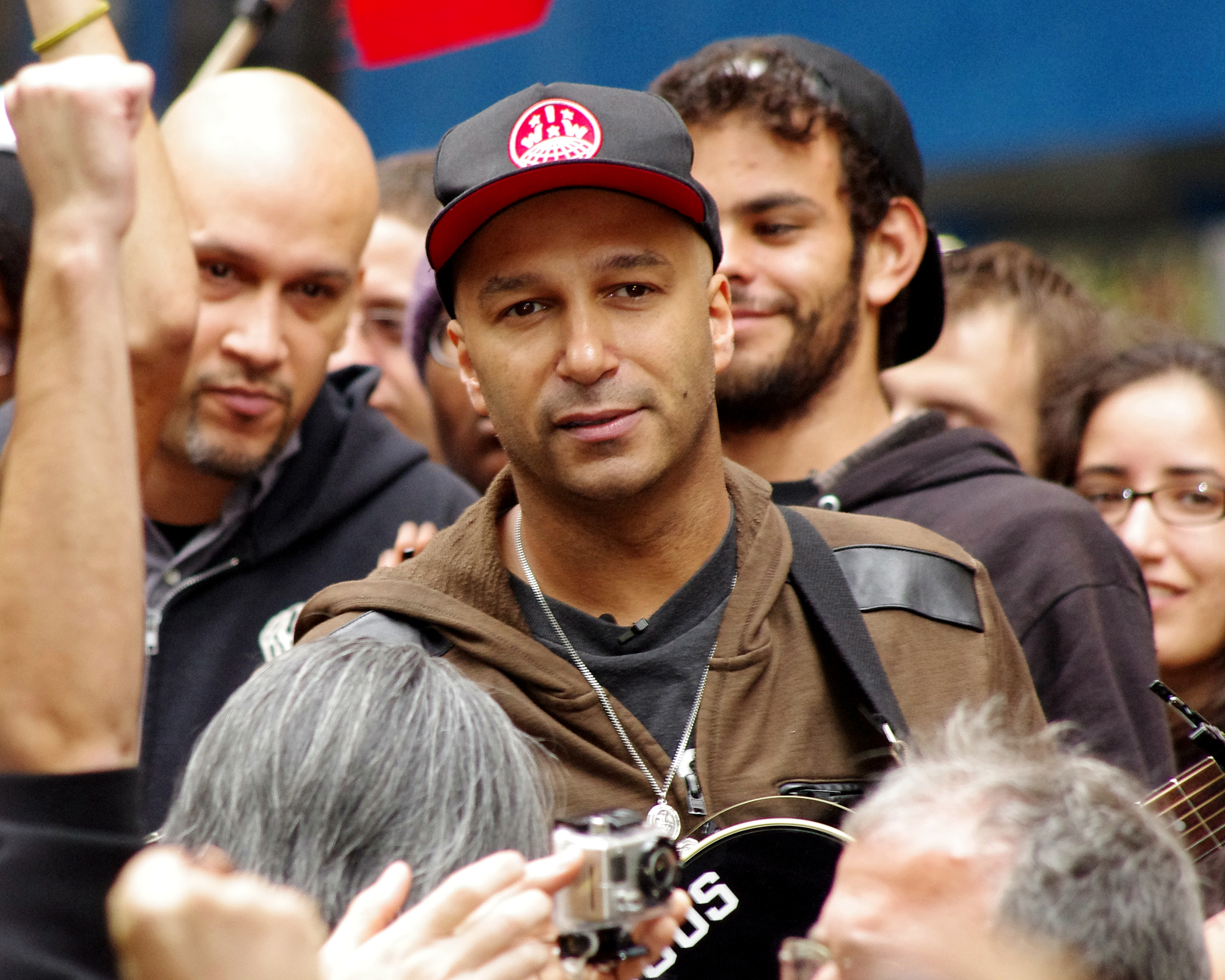
Tom Morello of Rage Against the Machine, who is a member of the Industrial Workers of the World, on Day 28 of Occupy Wall Street

On September 19, Roseanne Barr, the first celebrity to endorse the protest, spoke to protesters calling for a combination of capitalism and socialism and a system not based on "bloated talk radio hosts and that goddamn Ayn Rand book".

Filmmaker Michael Moore also spoke in support, saying, "They have tried to take our democracy and turn it into a kleptocracy." Rapper Lupe Fiasco, one of the initial supporters of Occupy Wall Street, wrote a poem, "Moneyman", for the protest. Susan Sarandon spoke at the demonstration saying, "I came down here to educate myself. ... There's a huge void between the rich and the poor in this country." Actor and activist Mark Ruffalo has supported the Occupy Wall Street protest saying, "Peaceful Resistance. That is what changes the world. We must be peaceful. This movement is about decency."

Jeff Mangum of Neutral Milk Hotel played a solo acoustic set for the protesters on October 4, and Tom Morello performed on October 13. Folk singer Pete Seeger led a group of several hundred protesters on a march through the streets on October 22, singing several songs, including "This Land Is Your Land" and "We Shall Overcome". Other musicians joining them included Arlo Guthrie, Tao Rodríguez-Seeger, Tom Chapin, David Amram, and Guy Davis.

On October 23, musicians Sean Lennon and Rufus Wainwright showed their support for the Occupy movement and played among a large crowd in Zuccotti Park. On October 25, international street artist Above completed a 255 foot long mural in Miami, Florida that read "Give a wall st. banker enough rope and he will hang himself" next to Interstate 95. The artist installed a controversial effigy that mimicked a 'wall st' banker hanging from a noose.

On November 8, folk-rock singers David Crosby and Graham Nash appeared at Zuccotti Park to offer their support and sing to the occupiers. Three days later, on November 11, folk singer Joan Baez sang there as well. Many of the young protesters were not familiar with her songs and were unaware of her long history as an activist.

==== Wealthy supporters ====
Several wealthy supporters have joined the protest, and have started a blog, we stand with the 99 percent, in which they say, "I am the 1%. I stand with the 99%," and give their stories. The granddaughter of oil tycoon H. L. Hunt, Leah Hunt-Hendrix, 28, was quoted as saying "We should acknowledge our privilege and claim the responsibilities that come with it." Farhad Ebrahimi, who received an inheritance as a teenager, has been participating in the Occupy Boston protest wearing a T-shirt that says, "Tax me. I'm good for it." Russell Simmons, hip-hop artist and successful businessman, has actively supported the OWS movement saying that he believes that it is his moral duty to do so. "You give what you get. I want to do what I can to relieve suffering and improve the quality of other's lives."

=== Police response ===
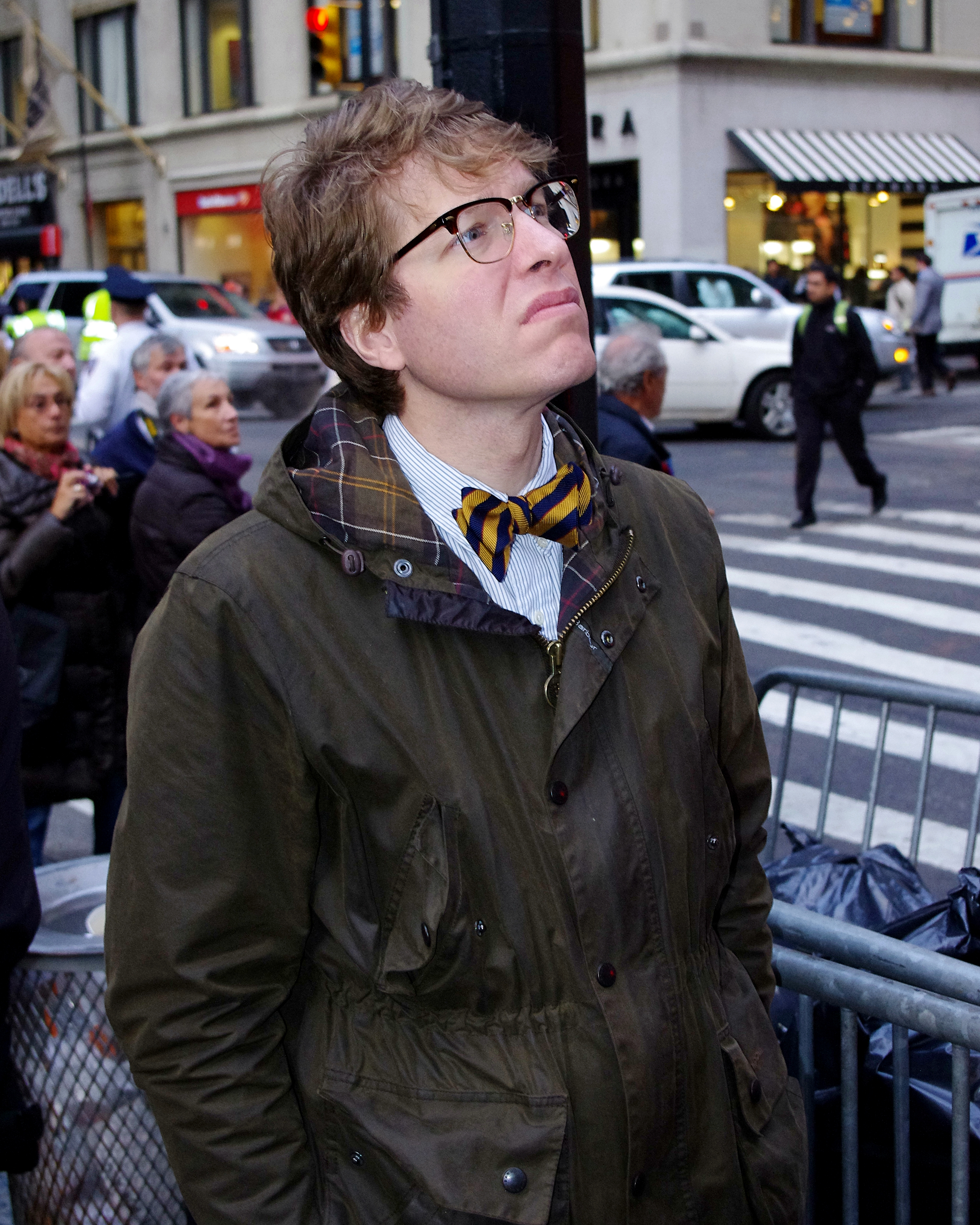
Community relations detective Rick Lee, called "The Hipster Cop"

During the park occupation the New York City Police Department assigned Rick Lee, a First Precinct community relations detective, to duty at the demonstration. He acted as one of the main liaisons with the protesters on behalf of the police department, and advised protesters on such matters as avoiding arrest and getting along with police as well as attempting to get information of the protester's plans. As a plainclothes officer, he was referred to as the "hipster cop" for his attire consisting of glasses, cardigan sweaters, skinny ties and skinny trousers. Reaction to his presence was mixed.

It was reported that Occupy Wall Street cost the New York City Police Department $17 million in overtime. According to a New York Times article, the dangers the camp posed to protesters and nearby residents was difficult to assess due to an informal divide that sprang up between who patrolled inside or outside of the park; while NYC police were stationed around the periphery, police "seem[ed] to have ceded patrols of the park interior to protesters."

=== Criticism ===
Conservative criticism of OWS has sometimes been vitriolic, casting the demonstrators as a thoroughly marginal group. Andrew Hartman wrote in The Chronicle Review that "many conservatives and pundits view the Wall Street protesters as envious ingrates looking for government handouts because they fear responsibility." Kate Zernike said in The New York Times that the Tea Party Patriots "portrayed Occupy protesters as freeloaders, or would-be freeloaders: 'Those occupying Wall Street and other cities, when they are intelligible, want less of what made America great and more of what is damaging to America: a bigger more powerful government to come in and take care of them so they don't have to work like the rest of us who pay our bills.'"

Brian Montopoli, writing for CBS News said that "The conservative criticism of the Occupy Wall Street movement is that it is a "growing mob" (House majority leader Eric Cantor) of "shiftless protestors" (The Tea Party Express) engaged in "class warfare" (GOP presidential candidate Herman Cain) whose grievances - whatever they are - are far outside the political mainstream." Matthew Continetti, also writing for CBS, said that conservatives "dismiss the movement as a fringe collection of left tendencies, along with assorted homeless, mental cases, and petty criminals." "Conservatives [have tried to] define the Occupy protesters before the protesters define themselves."

Ed Morrissey, writing in The Week, insisted that the Occupy movement wants "seizures and redistributions, which necessarily means more bureaucracies, higher spending, and many more opportunities for collusion between authorities and moneyed interests in one way or another." Linda Colley said in The Guardian, "A prime reason for [the diffidence between Democratic and Republican responses to OWS] is suggested by some of the Republican attacks on Occupy. The demonstrators were "mobs", said Eric Cantor, the House minority leader. Occupy was waging "class warfare", claimed Mitt Romney, an accusation some Republicans also level at Obama. But it was a rival of Romney for the Republican nomination, Herman Cain, who voiced the criticism Democrats and demonstrators here fear most. Occupy, and those backing it, according to Cain, are "anti-American"."

Douglas Rushkoff, in a special to CNN said that "Like the spokesmen for Arab dictators feigning bewilderment over protesters' demands, mainstream television news reporters finally training their attention on the growing Occupy Wall Street protest movement seem determined to cast it as the random, silly blather of an ungrateful and lazy generation of weirdos. They couldn't be more wrong and, as time will tell, may eventually be forced to accept the inevitability of their own obsolescence."

On October 5, 2011, conservative talk radio host Rush Limbaugh told his listening audience: "When I was 10 years old I was more self-sufficient than this parade of human debris calling itself Occupy Wall Street." Glenn Beck said on his internet television network GBTV, "Capitalists, if you think that you can play footsies with these people, you are wrong. They will come for you and drag you into the streets and kill you. They will do it. They're not messing around." Newt Gingrich said, "All the Occupy movements starts with the premise that we all owe them everything. Now, that is a pretty good symptom of how much the left has collapsed as a moral system in this country and why you need to reassert something as simple as saying to them, go get a job right after you take a bath." Rick Santorum also told the protesters to get jobs.

A group of bloggers, led by political commentator Erick Erickson, organized a website criticizing the movement entitled "We Are the 53%," referring to the 53% of Americans who earn enough income to pay federal income taxes. An opinion piece by CBS contributor Jim Edwards, comparing the We are the 99% blog to the 53% blog, commented that "once you've looked at both blogs, the impression you come away with is that the recession is as devastating to conservatives as it is to liberals, but that conservatives regard their misfortunes as their own fault whereas the liberals see structural forces at work -- lack of health insurance, student loans -- that they cannot overcome."

=== Popular culture references ===
CNBC correspondent Jane Wells reported that the Occupy Wall Street movement sparked parodies which connect the movement to pop culture icons from Star Wars and The Lord of the Rings and others. An image of Luke Skywalker holding a protest sign was published: "It wasn't glamorous but I had a steady living working on my uncle's moisture farm ... my aunt and uncle were unjustly murdered and the farm destroyed. I was forced to leave my home and join an extinct cult just to survive. I am now a member of an upstart movement to take down a greedy corrupt establishment. I AM THE 99%." Skywalker's enemies, the Imperial Storm Troopers, joined the protest on another image circulating on the Internet holding signs: "End Galactic Corporate Greed", "Get Our Troops Off Tatooine" and "Keep Your Empirical Hands Off My Healthcare". Parodies relating to Middle Earth include a woman who had written her complaint in Elvish, allegedly translated: "I spend every waking hour fighting Orcs while Elrond and Galadriel eat lembas bread all day. I am the 99%."

Other parodies include Occupy Narnia and Occupy Sesame Street. Occupy Sesame Street went viral and, following violent encounters between NYPD and the protesters, Tumblr posted pictures of Elmo arrested, Grover restrained, and Count von Count pepper-sprayed. Occupy Wall Street and its related protests were satirized in the South Park episode "1%", which aired on November 2, 2011. Remy Munasifi wrote and sang a song called "Occupy Wall Street Protest Song", which criticized the protestors for not understanding, in his opinion, how well off they are. According to AFP, the song went viral in early October.

Popular culture images are also employed by protesters to make statements. For example, Guy Fawkes masks from the graphic novel V for Vendetta (and the feature film of the same name) are worn by protesters in New York and around the world as visual symbols of resistance against corporate greed.

Despite Rush Limbaugh's claims about The Dark Knight Rises being a critique of Mitt Romney, the film was also analogous to Occupy Wall Street. The film was inspired by Darth Vader in the characterization of its villain Bane, who had significantly deviated from the source material, similarly to other characters of Christopher Nolan's trilogy about Batman. In addition, the film was released in the same year when Romney was campaigning for the presidential election, with Bain Capital, a company where Romney was extensively involved as a co-founder, had presumably influenced Bane as the film's main antagonist. Batman's consistent comparisons to Darth Vader could connect Bane to Palpatine, who was a politician seeking power like Romney while actor Liam Neeson had portrayed the mentors of both Darth Vader and Batman, specifically Qui-Gon Jinn in The Phantom Menace and Ra's al Ghul in Batman Begins, respectively.

=== Music videos ===
On October 26, 2011, the first video setting footage of Occupy Wall Street to the song Love, That's America by Melvin Van Peebles was uploaded to YouTube. In an interview with Van Peebles several weeks later, he discussed the song going viral. Turkish newspaper Radikal described the song as becoming the surprising unofficial anthem of the movement. On January 17, 2012, Van Peebles performed at the Players' Club to honor the fact that the song has become a theme for the Occupy Wall Street movement. On February 22, 2012, Van Peebles commented further, "When I found out that the song had been co-opted by Occupy Wall Street, my jaw dropped. It went viral online. People were remixing it and mashing it up with videos from the protests. The time I wrote it was a time of social upheaval — the Stonewall Riots had just happened. Forty years later, the same thing was going down in the streets of New York City."

== See also ==
Occupy articles

- List of Occupy movement topics
- List of Occupy movement protest locations
- The People's Library
- Occupy Our Homes

Other U.S. protests

- Bonus army 1932
- Poor People's Campaign 1968
- 1971 May Day Protests
- 2011 United States public employee protests
- 2011 Wisconsin protests

International

- Impact of the Arab Spring
- 2010–2011 Greek protests
- 15 October 2011 global protests

Related articles

- Bank Transfer Day
- Corporatocracy
- Corruption Perceptions Index
- Empowered democracy
- Grassroots movement
- List of countries by income equality
- List of countries by inequality-adjusted HDI
- Plutocracy
- Selected Historical income tax rates in the U.S. (1913–2010)
- Social peer-to-peer processes
- The One Percent – documentary about the growing wealth gap between America's wealthy elite compared to the overall citizenry
- Wealth inequality in the United States
