= List of IP version numbers =

Packets that hold Internet Protocol data carry a four-bit IP version number as the first field of its header. Currently, only IPv4 and IPv6 packets are seen on the Internet, having IP version numbers 4 and 6, respectively.

== IP version numbers ==
As the version number is carried in a four-bit field, only numbers 0–15 can be assigned.

IP version	Description	Year	Status
0	Internet Protocol, pre-v4	N/A	Reserved
1	Experimental version	1973	Obsolete
2	Experimental version	1977	Obsolete
3	Experimental version	1978	Obsolete
4	Internet Protocol version 4 (IPv4)	1981	Active
5	Internet Stream Protocol (ST)	1979	Obsolete, superseded by ST-II (or ST2)
5	Internet Stream Protocol (ST-II or ST2)	1987	Obsolete, superseded by ST2+
5	Internet Stream Protocol (ST2+)	1995	Obsolete
6	Simple Internet Protocol (SIP)	N/A	Obsolete, merged into IPv6 in 1995
6	Internet Protocol version 6 (IPv6)	1995	Active
7	TP/IX The Next Internet (IPv7)	1993	Obsolete
8	P Internet Protocol (PIP)	1994	Obsolete, merged into SIP in 1993
9	TCP and UDP over Bigger Addresses (TUBA)	1992	Obsolete
9	IPv9	1994	April Fools' Day joke
9	Chinese IPv9	2004	Abandoned
10–14	N/A	N/A	Unassigned
15	Version field sentinel value	N/A	Reserved

== History ==
During the development of the first version of the Internet Protocol in the 1970s, the initial experimental versions 1 to 3 were not standardized. The first working version that was widely deployed was assigned version number 4.

A separate protocol based on reliable connections was developed and assigned version 5.

IP version 7 was chosen in 1988 by R. Ullmann as the next IP version because he incorrectly assumed that version 6 was in use for ST-II. However, ST-II had reused version 5 of the original ST protocol.

In the early 1990s, when it became apparent that IPv4 could not sustain routing in a growing Internet, several new Internet Protocols were proposed. The Internet Protocol that finally emerged was assigned version number 6, being the lowest free number greater than 4.

The PIP protocol and TUBA protocol used versions 8 and 9, following version 7 for TP/IX.

In 2004, an IPv9 protocol was developed in China using 256-bit addresses.
