= Distributed denial-of-service attacks on root nameservers =

Type of cyber attack

Distributed denial-of-service attacks on root nameservers are Internet events in which distributed denial-of-service attacks target one or more of the thirteen Domain Name System root nameserver clusters. The root nameservers are critical infrastructure components of the Internet, mapping domain names to IP addresses and other resource record (RR) data.

Attacks against the root nameservers could, in theory, impact operation of the entire global Domain Name System, and thus all Internet services that use the global DNS, rather than just specific websites. However, in practice, the root nameserver infrastructure is highly resilient and distributed, using both the inherent features of DNS (result caching, retries, and multiple servers for the same zone with fallback if one or more fail), and, in recent years, a combination of anycast and load balancer techniques used to implement most of the thirteen nominal individual root servers as globally distributed clusters of servers in multiple data centers.

In particular, the caching and redundancy features of DNS mean that it would require a sustained outage of all the major root servers for many days before any serious problems were created for most Internet users, and even then there are still numerous ways in which ISPs could set their systems up during that period to mitigate even a total loss of all root servers for an extended period of time: for example by installing their own copies of the global DNS root zone data on nameservers within their network, and redirecting traffic to the root server IP addresses to those servers. Nevertheless, DDoS attacks on the root zone are taken seriously as a risk by the operators of the root nameservers, and they continue to upgrade the capacity and DDoS mitigation capabilities of their infrastructure to resist any future attacks.

An effective attack against DNS might involve targeting top-level domain servers (such as those servicing the .com domain) instead of root name servers. Alternatively, a man-in-the-middle attack or DNS poisoning attack could be used, though they would be more difficult to carry out.

== Attacks ==
=== October 21, 2002 ===
On October 21, 2002 an attack lasting for approximately one hour was targeted at all 13 DNS root name servers. The attackers sent many ICMP ping packets using a botnet to each of the servers. However, because the servers were protected by packet filters which were configured to block all incoming ICMP ping packets, they did not sustain much damage and there was little to no impact on Internet users.

=== February 6, 2007 ===
On February 6, 2007 an attack began at 10:00 UTC and lasted twenty-four hours. At least two of the root servers (G-ROOT and L-ROOT) reportedly "suffered badly" while two others (F-ROOT and M-ROOT) "experienced heavy traffic". The latter two servers largely mitigated the damage by distributing requests to other root server instances with anycast addressing. ICANN published a formal analysis shortly after the event.

Due to a lack of detail, speculation about the incident proliferated in the press until details were released.

=== November 30, 2015 ===
During two intervals on November 30, 2015 and December 1, 2015, several of the root name servers received up to 5 million queries per second each, receiving valid queries for the domain name "336901.com" and then the domain "916yy.com" the next day. Source addresses were spread throughout IPv4 space, however these may have been spoofed. Some root server networks became saturated, resulting in timeouts, however redundancy among the root servers prevented downstream issues from occurring during this incident.

== Threats ==
=== Operation Global Blackout 2012 ===
On February 12, 2012, a statement was posted on Pastebin cited to be from Anonymous, threatening an attack on the root servers on March 31, 2012.

"To protest SOPA, Wallstreet, our irresponsible leaders and the beloved bankers who are starving the world for their own selfish needs out of sheer sadistic fun, On March 31, anonymous will shut the Internet down," reads the statement. "Remember, this is a protest, we are not trying to ‘kill' the Internet, we are only temporarily shutting it down where it hurts the most…It may only last one hour, maybe more, maybe even a few days. No matter what, it will be global. It will be known."
