= .root =

root is the name of a database record of the root zone in the Domain Name System of the Internet that was occasionally used as a diagnostic marker. Its presence demonstrated the root zone was not truncated upon loading by a root nameserver.

According to technical observers the single .root entry was replaced in 2006 with just vrsn-end-of-zone-marker-dummy-record, to be reintroduced later in 2006 in its original form. The entry was deleted again during the preparations for the deployment of DNSSEC at the root zone in 2010.

The existence of the record was observed with the domain information groper (dig) utility by querying for a TXT Record for the domain name:

dig vrsn-end-of-zone-marker-dummy-record.root

This entry returned the word "plenus", which is Latin for full or complete.
