= New IP =

Proposed alternative internet architecture backed by Huawei

New IP refers to a set of proposals for a novel framework for a future Internet Protocol backed by Huawei and its subsidiary Futurewei which have notably been introduced to the ITU and the IETF and presented at various IEEE conferences between 2018 and 2020.

The proposals have received severe criticism, being labeled as "dystopian" and "authoritarian" by the international press while the ICANN noted that, if implemented, they could "make pervasive monitoring much easier".

Huawei subsequently responded to these criticisms in an online article.

A research paper published by University of Pennsylvania Carey Law School concluded that the New IP proposal "was not necessarily a trojan horse intended to expand state control of the Internet or embed authoritarianism into its architecture". It explains this position by stating that "China has spent the last decade heavily investing in and promoting innovation into the exact type of future network capabilities proposed by New IP in order to support its long-term industrial policy objectives. Likely recognizing that such capabilities strongly aligned with its business interests—particularly the capabilities demanded by future business-critical industrial use cases like deterministic QoS—Huawei simply seized the opportunity being dangled in front of it".

There have further been arguments that later proposals including Future IP Evolution and Future Vertical Communication Networks were simply a rebranding of the New IP proposals.

Researchers from the SCION project asserted that "bashing [New IP] without closer inspection does not do it justice," and that "Huawei identifies several valid problems of today’s Internet and tries to propose solutions for some of them" with the intent to "spur worldwide research in this field."

== See also ==
- IPv9 (China) – Chinese proposal for an alternative Internet addressing scheme
- Digital Silk Road – Part of China's Belt and Road Initiative
