= Open Root Server Network =

Former network of DNS name servers

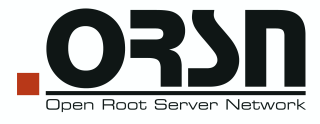
Open Root Server Network logo

Open Root Server Network (ORSN) was a network of Domain Name System root nameservers for the Internet. ORSN DNS root zone information was kept in synchronization with the "official" Domain Name System root nameservers coordinated by ICANN. The networks were 100% compatible, though ORSN was operated independently. The ORSN servers were primarily placed in Europe. ORSN is also used by public name servers, providing Domain Name System access freely for everyone, without any limitation until the project closed in May 2019.

ORSN was primarily started to reduce the over-dependence of Internet users on the United States and Department of Commerce/IANA/ICANN/VeriSign, limit the control over the Internet that this gives, while ensuring that domain names remain unambiguous. It also helps avoid the technical possibility of global "Internet shutdown" by one party. They also expect their network to make domain name resolutions faster for everyone.

Markus Grundmann, based in Germany, is the founder of ORSN, and author of ORSN distributed system management and monitoring software solution.

Paul Vixie, the main designer of BIND, the de facto standard software for DNS servers in UNIX-like operating systems, is a high-profile proponent of the ORSN. Paul Vixie is member of Security and Stability Advisory Committee of ICANN; he served on the board of trustees of the American Registry for Internet Numbers (ARIN) from 2005 to 2013, also as ARIN chairman in 2009 and 2010.

ORSN has two operating modes:

- ICANN BASED (default) operating mode involves daily synchronization, except that removed TLDs are not removed from the ORSN root.
- INDEPENDENT mode has no automatic synchronization and is activated "whenever the political situation of the world - in our opinion - makes this step necessary because the possibility of a modification and/or a downtime of the ICANN root zone exists or we do not want that our root zone will rebuild automatically."

== Operating history ==
- ORSN operated from February 2002 until the end of 2008.
- ORSN operated again from June 2013 until May 2019.

Several Internet service providers in Europe used ORSN as a root for their name servers.

== ORSN root nameservers ==
ORSN's root server system consisted of 13 root servers, a distributed system connected on a secure VPN, for synchronization and management. All of the 13 servers ran on FreeBSD and BIND. Monitoring and management daemon was developed by founder, Markus Grundmann.

Letter	IP country	IPv4 address	IPv6 address	Operator / sponsor
A	Austria	185.29.88.82	2a00:a6a0:1:1::6:2	XINON GmbH, St. Anna am Aigen, Austria
B	Poland	91.206.27.66	2001:67c:2044:c139::53	HosTeam S.C., Poznań, Poland
C	Germany	178.19.70.8	2a01:440:1:f:178:19:70:8	whTec, Oberhausen, Germany
D	Netherlands	85.17.122.15	2001:1af8:40e0:a007:bbb::	Mr. Ömer Canıtez
E	Denmark			Zen Systems A/S, Copenhagen, Denmark
F	Germany	212.224.71.116	2a01:7e0:0:100:212:224:71:116	First Colo GmbH, Munich, Germany
G	Greece	193.93.165.1		Association for the Development of West Athens (ASDA), Athens, Greece
H	France	188.165.175.112	2001:41d0:2:5a70::c0de	Mr. Péter Vámos, Budapest, Hungary
I	India	180.149.57.12		National Knowledge Network, New Delhi, India
J	Germany	188.138.82.98		3Q Medien GmbH, Potsdam, Germany
K	Germany	82.206.1.22	2001:4b88:9000::	Titan Networks GmbH, Hofheim, Germany
L	Netherlands	79.99.236.6		JustNet GmbH, Baden, Switzerland
M	Germany	82.193.249.196		Markus Grundmann, Founder of ORSN, Germany

table data from ORSN Root Zone Version: 2015022600
ORSN Root Server Systems Technical Information

== ORSN public DNS servers ==
ORSN public DNS servers were operated by the community of ORSN, providing Domain Name System access freely for everyone, without any limitation. It did not serve additional TLDs but only the regular ICANN TLDs. ORSN public DNS servers were intended to respect privacy and should not have logged usage, although these servers were run independently and there was no technical means by which ORSN could enforce this. Anyone was able to choose to run an OSRN public DNS server and submit it via web form. These DNS servers were an alternative option for users that did not have a local ORSN-ready server or in the case that the local ISP did not support the use of ORSN. All registered servers were monitored constantly, for availability and functionality. Most of these are Non-Operational including the availability website but a couple still work.

FQDN	IP country	IPv4 address	IPv6 address	Operator / sponsor	Operational Status
ns0.freeinfosociety.org	France	188.165.175.115	2001:41d0:2:5a70::1		Non-Operational
ns1.freeinfosociety.org	France	37.187.23.23	2001:41d0:a:1717::1		Non-Operational
ns2.freeinfosociety.org	France	37.187.99.178	2001:41d0:a:23b2::1		Non-Operational
ns01.ch.orsn.it-schwerin.de	Switzerland	178.209.50.232	2a02:418:6a04:178:209:50:232:cafe		Non-Operational
orsn-ns01.zirkumflex.net	Germany	84.200.83.54	2001:1608:10:102::acab		Non-Operational
orsn-ns.godau.eu	Germany	109.230.224.42	2a02:d40:3:1:ac11:71ff:feee:41b3		Non-Operational
orsn-ns2.godau.eu	Germany	87.118.126.225	2001:1b60:3:267:3436:21:0:1		Non-Operational
orsn.dnscache.cyborg-connect.de	Germany	37.187.193.30		Cyborg-Connect.de	Non-Operational
orsn-ns01.first-colo.de	Germany	212.224.71.71	2a01:7e0::212:224:71:71	First Colo GmbH	Operational
orsn-ns02.first-colo.nl	Netherlands	79.133.62.62		First Colo GmbH	Operational
a.tx.nic.servertx.cf	(Netherlands) Amsterdam	195.20.51.139		Verotel International	Non-Operational

ORSN Public DNS data last updated on 18 October 2022.
source: Official ORSN Public DNS live data and monitoring.

== See also ==
- Alternative DNS root
- Domain Name System
- OpenNIC
- Public recursive name servers
- Root nameserver
