= IPv9 (China) =

Chinese proposal for an alternative Internet addressing scheme

In 2004, news reports emerged that China was developing a new "IPv9" technology to replace the existing Internet Protocol. This appears to have been a proposal to link Internet addressing with Chinese 10-digit telephone numbers. The protocol was a research project of the Institute of Chemical Engineering (Shanghai), and there was little evidence that it gained any real-world adoption.

A small number of papers and patents have been published which refer to IPv9 addressing. Proponents of the scheme say that it promotes digital sovereignty, and is superior to IPv6 in that "every cell and living gene in the world can be assigned to an IPV9 address".

The Chinese IPv9 proposal is distinct from RFC 1347, "TCP and UDP with Bigger Addresses (TUBA)", a proposal for network address extension using CLNP which was provisionally assigned the Internet Protocol version number 9, and RFC 1606, an April Fools' Day Request for Comments that describes a fictional IPv9 protocol that featured a vast addressing space and a huge number of network layers.

== See also ==
- .chn, an alternative DNS root proposal
- Telephone numbers in China
- New IP
