= Karl Denninger =

American businessman

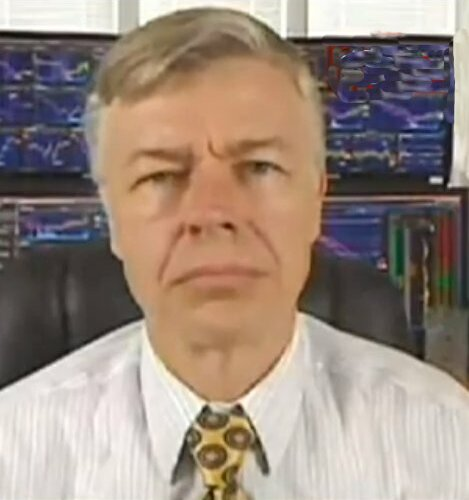
- Denninger giving an interview on RT America
- Known for: Founder and CEO of MCSNet, a founding member of the Tea Party movement, political activism

Karl Denninger is an American technology businessman, finance blogger, and political activist, sometimes referred to as a founding member of the Tea Party movement.

== Technology entrepreneurship ==
Denninger was the founder and CEO of MCSNet in Chicago. Opened as Macro Computer Solutions, Incorporated in 1987, it expanded its service offerings in 1993 to become one of the area's first commercial internet service providers. Among its customers was the Chicago Public Library, which relied on MCSNet for both internet access and web hosting. In 1997, he led a coalition of ISPs in setting up the Enhanced Domain Name System, a short-lived alternative DNS root, which allowed registrants to add their own generic top-level domains. Denninger continued to run MCSNet until August 1998, when he sold it to Winstar Communications for an undisclosed amount. After the sale of MCSNet, he moved to Florida, where he began to devote more time to stock trading and political activism.

== Blogging and political activism ==
Denninger is a founding contributor to the libertarian-oriented finance blog, market-ticker.org, and has used the internet to bring attention to his concerns with the financial system. He now utilizes his blog to sell his home networking daemon and sell the artwork of his daughter. In the aftermath of the collapse of Bear Stearns, in March 2008, he helped found the website FedUpUSA.org. He came to national attention for the criticisms of the Emergency Economic Stabilization Act of 2008, which he posted on FedUpUSA.org in September that year. Of special concern to Denninger was the over-the-counter trading of credit default swaps, as well as the high leverage of financial institutions; his objections to the bailout plan stemmed from the fact that it did not address either of these issues. He has also spoken out against high-frequency trading, particularly in the aftermath of the 2010 Flash Crash.

Denninger was also one of the early members of the Tea Party movement, sometimes referred to as a founder. On January 20, 2009, the day of President Obama's first inauguration, he published a blog post calling on readers to mail tea bags to the White House and Congress on February 1, echoing a suggestion by a commenter on one of his earlier blog posts. However, Denninger later expressed concern with the Tea Party movement, stating in an October 20, 2010, blog post that Republicans had hijacked the movement and perverted its original goals to the standard Republican concerns of "guns, gays and God".

== Media appearances ==
Denninger has been invited as a guest on a variety of television and radio programs. In July 2009, he appeared on CNBC Reports. In April 2010, he appeared on the Glenn Beck show, where he spoke about the FedUpUSA.org website. In October 2011, he appeared on The Dylan Ratigan Show on MSNBC to voice his support for the Occupy Wall Street movement. In January 2013, he spoke with Voice of Russia in an interview covering a variety of topics, including the United States public debt, Medicare reform, and his opposition to Keynesian economics.

== Books ==
- Leverage: How Cheap Money Will Destroy the World, Wiley, November 2011, ISBN 978-1-118-12284-6.
