= Journal of the Operations Research Society of China =

The Journal of the Operations Research Society of China is a quarterly peer-reviewed academic journal covering operations research. It is published by Springer Science+Business Media on behalf of the Operations Research Society of China. The editor-in-chief is Ya-xiang Yuan (Chinese Academy of Sciences). The journal is abstracted and indexed in Scopus and Zentralblatt Math.
