= Alternative DNS root =

Unofficial alternatives to the official DNS Root Zone

The Internet uses the Domain Name System (DNS) to associate numeric computer IP addresses with human-readable names. The top level of the domain name hierarchy, the DNS root, contains the top-level domains that appear as the suffixes of all Internet domain names. The most widely used (and first) DNS root is administered by the Internet Corporation for Assigned Names and Numbers (ICANN). In addition, several organizations operate alternative DNS roots, often referred to as alt roots. These alternative domain name systems operate their own root name servers and commonly administer their own specific name spaces consisting of custom top-level domains.

The Internet Architecture Board (IAB) has spoken out strongly against alternative roots in RFC 2826.

== Overview ==
The DNS root zone consists of pointers to the authoritative domain name servers for all top-level domains (TLDs). The root zone is hosted on a collection of root servers operated by several organizations around the world that all use a specific, approved list of domains that is managed by ICANN. By contrast, alternative roots typically include pointers to all of the TLD servers for domains delegated by ICANN, as well as name servers for other, custom top-level domains that are not sanctioned by ICANN. Some alternative roots are operated by the organizations that manage these alternative TLDs.

Zach Bastick proposes that alternative DNS roots have allowed for more democratic control of the Internet:

The implementation of alternative gTLDs predates any significant debate on name space extension by official actors, and this exemplifies how democratising the DNS alters the pace of developing Internet policy, the nature of decisions that justify that policy development, and political dynamics and user autonomy in the network infrastructure.

Unless one specifically changes their DNS resolution settings, alternative DNS top level domains are generally unreachable, and very few Internet service providers provide this configuration by default.

== Implementations ==
Some organizations provide alternative DNS root services, such as additional top-level domains.

=== Handshake ===
Handshake is a decentralized implementation of a DNS root zone using blockchain and cryptocurrency technology to create a peer-to-peer alternative to the 13 root name servers managed by ICANN.

Unlike other attempts, Handshake does not aim to replace the existing DNS; rather, it seeks to supplement and enhance it by allowing anyone to bid, register, and manage their own TLDs without an intermediate registrar or delegating authority. Since the root zone file records are not centrally managed, and instead are stored on a public blockchain, owners of Handshake TLDs can add or change top-level resource records to delegate authoritative name servers and set up DNSSEC zone signing directly.

Existing TLDs are reserved in the Handshake blockchain such that resolving traditional domain names (i.e. zones under .com, .org, .net, etc.) through a Handshake node or name server are directed back to ICANN's root servers. In addition, the top 100,000 most popular domains are reserved as Handshake TLDs which can be redeemed by the original domain owner.

=== Namecoin ===
Namecoin is a blockchain and cryptocurrency to support the alternative top-level domain .bit.

=== OpenNIC ===
OpenNIC is a user-owned and -controlled alternative to InterNIC and ICANN providing a non-national democratic alternative to traditional domain registries. OpenNIC servers are able to resolve all ICANN top-level domains, OpenNIC-specific top-level domains, and those in other alternative DNS roots with which they have reached peering agreements.

=== Yeti DNS Project ===
Yeti DNS Project is an attempt to build an alternative root server dedicated to IPv6. Sponsored by a Chinese state agency, the project aims at experimenting with different new DNS-related technology and enabling sovereign countries to explore and control the Internet and enhance their network sovereignty.

=== .chn ===
.chn is a new top-level domain with its own root DNS server for an Internet of Things (IoT) network in China. The company developing this alternative root claims that China has its own intellectual right on this new alternative domain name root and the associated IoT network, and that it will become the second computer network in the world. It is claimed to be part of a "IPv9" decimal network/numeric domain name system developed and innovated in China.

=== Russian National Domain Name System ===
The Russian National Domain Name System (Russian: НСДИ) is an alternative DNS root project started in 2019 by Roskomnadzor—a government department for communications, IT and mass media—that is gradually becoming mandatory for all ISPs in Russia.

As of March 2021, its servers are located on the Moscow Internet Exchange.

The mission of the project is to provide an alternative DNS root for all users of the Internet within Russia. The main goal is to continue the functioning of the Russian Internet subnetwork in case of Russia's potential disconnection from the rest of the Internet (Sovereign Internet Law).

== Defunct implementations ==
=== Open Root Server Network (ORSN) ===
Open Root Server Network (ORSN) was a network of Domain Name System root nameservers for the Internet. ORSN root zone information was normally kept in synchronization with the "official" root nameservers coordinated by ICANN. ORSN Public DNS Servers were operated by the community of ORSN, providing Domain Name System access freely for everyone, without any limitation. ORSN public DNS servers did not log usage. "The ORSN project was canceled on May 2019 and will never come back."

=== AlterNIC ===
AlterNIC was created before ICANN's creation to challenge the monopoly of InterNIC on domain name governance at the time.

=== eDNS ===
eDNS (Enhanced Domain Name Service) was founded by a coalition of ISPs led by Karl Denninger of the Chicago-area MCSNet. It ceased operation in 1998. It served the following domains: biz (general business use), corp (corporations), fam (for and about family), k12 (for and about children), npo (non-profit organizations), per (personal domains), web (web-based sites, Web pages).

=== Open RSC ===
One of the notable challengers to ICANN's control of the DNS namespace was Open RSC (Open Root Server Confederation), a group that grew out of private discussions and developed into a public Listserv mailing list. It grew large enough that the group decided to submit an application to the United States government to run the DNS.

The organization posted bylaws and articles of incorporation outlining Open RSC's position following extensive public discussion regarding the manner in which the DNS was operated.

ICANN chairwoman Esther Dyson acknowledged adopting features such as membership from Open RSC in her response to the United States Department of Commerce.

Open RSC publishes a root zone containing additional top level domains not found in the ICANN root zone.

=== RealNames ===
Microsoft offered the RealNames service on its Internet Explorer browser address bar. RealNames, to users of Internet Explorer, was in effect a domain registry. RealNames shut down operations in 2002 following a decision by Microsoft to redirect the billion page views per calendar quarter that RealNames was resolving from the browser address bar into its MSN search engine.

== See also ==
- Domain Name System
- Open Root Server Network
- Public recursive name servers
- Root nameserver
