= X.org =

x.org is a single-letter second-level internet domain name.

It may also refer to:

- X.Org Foundation, a community-based foundation which took over X stewardship in 2004
- X.Org Server, the reference implementation of X developed by the Foundation
- X.Org, the organization in charge of X standards from 1999, as part of The Open Group

== See also ==
- x.com
- X Window System, a windowing system for bitmap displays, common on UNIX-like computer operating systems
