= Mel Schrieberg =

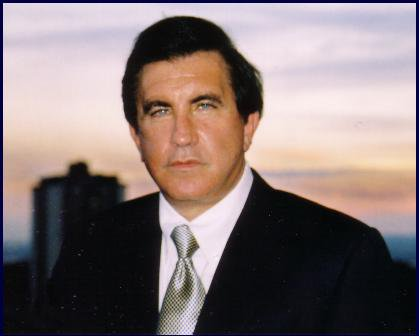
- Born: Brooklyn, New York
- Education: University of Rhode Island (BS 1967); Farleigh Dickinson (MBA 1980)
- Known for: Co-founder of Election.com, running first major public election ever on the Internet

Melvin Schrieberg (1942–2017) was an American businessman, best known for co-founding Election.com, where he acted as the project manager for the first major political election ever run over the internet, the Arizona Democratic Primary of 2000, won by Al Gore. He later served as acting Chief Executive Officer of SpiralFrog, one of the first ad-supported free music services during 2007-2008.

== Early life ==
Mel Schrieberg was a native of New York City, born in Brooklyn. He went on to earn an undergraduate degree from University of Rhode Island and an MBA from Farleigh Dickinson University. He also completed the Harvard Business School Entrepreneurial Program.

== Early business career ==
Upon graduation from Farleigh Dickinson, Schrieberg went on to work for Xerox, and later ROLM, serving there at the time of its acquisition by IBM. He soon became a General Manager of their New York operating company, and later served as Eastern Region Manager IBM. He subsequently became a Corporate Vice President at ADP. Schreiberg was elected Executive Vice President of the Proginet Corporation, a software company, on May 24, 1995, which achieved record sales in 1997, where he remained until 1999.

=== election.com ===
In 1999, with Joe Mohen, Schrieberg co-founded election.com, a company which provided the infrastructure and operations for internet voting. While many observers believed that no United States elections would be conducted online for decades, incredibly, the company was awarded the contract to conduct the Arizona 2000 Democratic Primary over the web, where voters would have the option to remotely on their personal computers. The company received an extraordinary amount of press coverage and attention from political leaders, even globally. Organizations opposed to franchise expansion conducted press campaigns and started at least one lawsuit in Federal Court attempting to stop the election. Internet companies rallied around election.com to ensure that the election was a success, and some, such as VeriSign made equity investments in the company. The online election was held in March 2000, and was declared a success, with no reported security compromises, and with records for primary voter turnout shattered.

=== SpiralFrog ===
SpiralFrog was an attempt to create a market driven solution to digital music piracy. In January 2007, there had just been a spectacular takeover attempt of a digital music company, SpiralFrog, which was among the first companies to distribute the mainstream catalog of songs free to consumers, in return for consumers seeing commercials as the songs were downloading. The takeover attempt, by fired CEO Robin Kent, was backed by British hedge fund investors. Under Schrieberg's leadership, the hostile takeover attempt was beaten back, the company was stabilized, and SpiralFrog was able to successfully launch its service in late 2007. Ultimately SpiralFrog was not successful, and Schrieberg left the company immediately after the 2008 financial crisis. While the company did pioneer the ad-supported free music model, it supplied music tracks in the form of encrypted downloads, which unfortunately were incompatible with many types of devices, such as those from Apple. Afterwards, other companies were able to adapt this model to streaming, which ultimately led to a resurgence of music industry revenues. SpiralFrog was too early to market, but it, and Schrieberg were influential in steering the industry on new course.

=== Later years ===
Mel was a co-founder of a technology company, Ecorithm, that reduced energy consumption of skyscrapers by as much as half. It was one of the first big data/analytics software projects focused on energy efficiency for commercial buildings using Software-as-a-Service (Saas). He remained active as a mentor to other executives through the New York Executive Forum. Schrieberg died of a sudden illness in New York on July 31, 2017. At the time of his death, he was residing in Fort Lee, New Jersey.
