= Dana Leslie Fields =

American magazine publisher

- Born: New York City
- Education: Duke University
- Occupations: Magazine & digital media publisher
- Employer: Nylon
- Known for: Inaugural inductee into the Magazine Hall of Fame
- Spouse: Dan Gearon
- Children: Matthew Gearon

Dana Leslie Fields is an American magazine publisher and an inaugural inductee into the Magazine Publishers Hall of Fame. She is best known for having been the publisher of Rolling Stone, President of FHM magazine, as well as other magazine titles with young adult audiences. In 2014, Fields became the publisher of Nylon magazine.

== Early life ==
Fields was born into the third generation of New York fashion industry families, growing up around the fashion marketing industry. Her grandfather started out in Manhattan’s Lower East Side, making suits for the immigrant community and later moving to Moppets, one of the largest children’s fashion manufacturers. Her stepfather, Mike Kislak, was an importer of many French fashion lines, including Cacharel. During her school years, young Dana worked in the family fashion businesses in Europe, learning other languages especially French. At 18 she enrolled at Duke University, and she was photo editor of the student newspaper, the Duke Chronicle, and also worked part-time as a stringer for UPI. After graduating magna cum laude, she found a job in advertising sales at an in-flight magazine company called the East-West Network.

== Rolling Stone ==
In 1981, Fields was looking to get into fashion ad sales and she had an impromptu lunch with then a Rolling Stones Executive, Dan Chaifair. Fields was then hired as an account executive for fashion ad sales; in 1982, she was put in charge of the New England region and sales increased 288%. She was quickly promoted to Vice President. By 1990, Rolling Stone owner Jann Wenner and his company, Wenner Media, also acquired full ownership of US Magazine, and in 1991 launched Men's Journal; by then sporting a full portfolio of titles focused on the lucrative 18-34 young adult demographic. Fields was promoted to Associate Publisher in 1990, and in 1991 was named Group Publisher of all these titles. This was a period of spectacular growth for Wenner Media and Fields' star rose within the company and in New York media circles. In her first year as Group Publisher, newsstand sales increased by 110,000 copies. And in 1993, US Magazine advertising pages increased 20%; she brought in Bloomingdales as a client, with a men's fashion show, and music video tie in. In 1994 she was named to Crains Forty under 40. Both Rolling Stone and Men's Journal became top performers in the male 18-34 advertising category. In 1995, Fields organized a highly innovative collaboration with two of her biggest competitors, Men's Health and Esquire, for a joint promotional campaign for the Hagger Clothing Company, cited by the common client as "taking advertising to another level." In 1997 she brought in the AT&T business to Rolling Stone to sponsor a cover store on college campuses. She secured business from Tommy Hilfiger. MediaPost, when subsequently wring about Fields, wrote that "her performance at Wenner was outstanding..." In 1998 rumors surfaced of a falling out between Fields and Wenner Media General Manager Kent Brownridge. Fields took an extended maternity leave and never returned to the company. Her 17-year tenure at Rolling Stone was over.

== FHM ==
In 1999, the British media giant EMAP was looking to bring its highly successful young men's title FHM to the United States, to challenge Maxim magazine. Fields was hired to be president of FHM, reporting directly to Chairman Jim Dunning In her first year at FHM, Fields was able to pick off a substantial number of advertising clients away from other young men's magazines including GQ, ESPN, Spin and Maxim, and FHM monthly circulation grew rapidly to 750,000. Advertisers such as Tommy Hillfinger, Jim Beam, Nintendo, and Toyota became advertisers. Fields star was rising in New York media, adorning the cover of MediaWeek in February 2000. By 2002, FHM was the fastest growing men's magazine in the United States, with circulation exceeding one million, and Fields was she named Magazine Publisher of the Year. Fields was featured on the cover of Media Magazine in the July 2004 issue, captioned "Men's Magazine's Are Smoking Hot", with Fields holding FHM. In 2005, Media Daily News reported a novel advertising campaigns she brought to FHM from the BMW owned Mini (marque), and she was nominated for Advertising Sales Person of the Year by Media Industry News. In 2006, Brooke Hogan, daughter of wrestling celebrity Hulk Hogan and a recording artist who was charting on the Billboard charts, was selected to be on the cover of FHM. However, before the issue went to print, it was discovered that Hogan had not yet reached her 21st birthday, and Fields proactively pulled all advertising for distilled spirits from the issue, to prevent what otherwise would have been a scandal from using a minor to promote the sales of alcoholic beverages. Later that year, FHM chose Diana Chaifair as Miss FHM. It turned out that Chiafair was the daughter of Dan Chiafair, the former Rolling Stone executive who had given Fields her start back in 1981.

With the secular decline in printed media, and with FHM becoming less lucrative, Fields left FHM, and started a media consultancy.

== Nylon ==
In 2014, Fields and Joe Mohen partnered to merge Nylon Magazine with FashionIndie, to create a media company for young adult audiences, with an editorial focus on fashion, music, and lifestyle. Fields became EVP and Publisher of the new Nylon. The Nylon takeover in 2014 is a case study of the transition of magazine title with primarily print revenues into one with primarily digital revenues. She remained Publisher of Nylon while it completed its transition to a nearly all-digital platform.

== Personal life ==
In 1996, Fields married Dan Gearon, who attended United States Military Academy and Columbia University, and, who at the time, was CEO of a Boston-based advertising agency, whose client, the Boston Beer Company, concocted a Steinbier (stone beer) from a German recipe dating back centuries for their reception. Fields serves on the Board of Overseers of the Duke Cancer Institute, and is active in religious philanthropy. Fields and Gearon have a son, Matthew, born in 1998.
