= Laško Brewery =

Brewery in Laško, Styria, Slovenia

Laško Brewery (Slovene: Pivovarna Laško) is the largest brewery in Slovenia. It is located in Laško and named after the town.

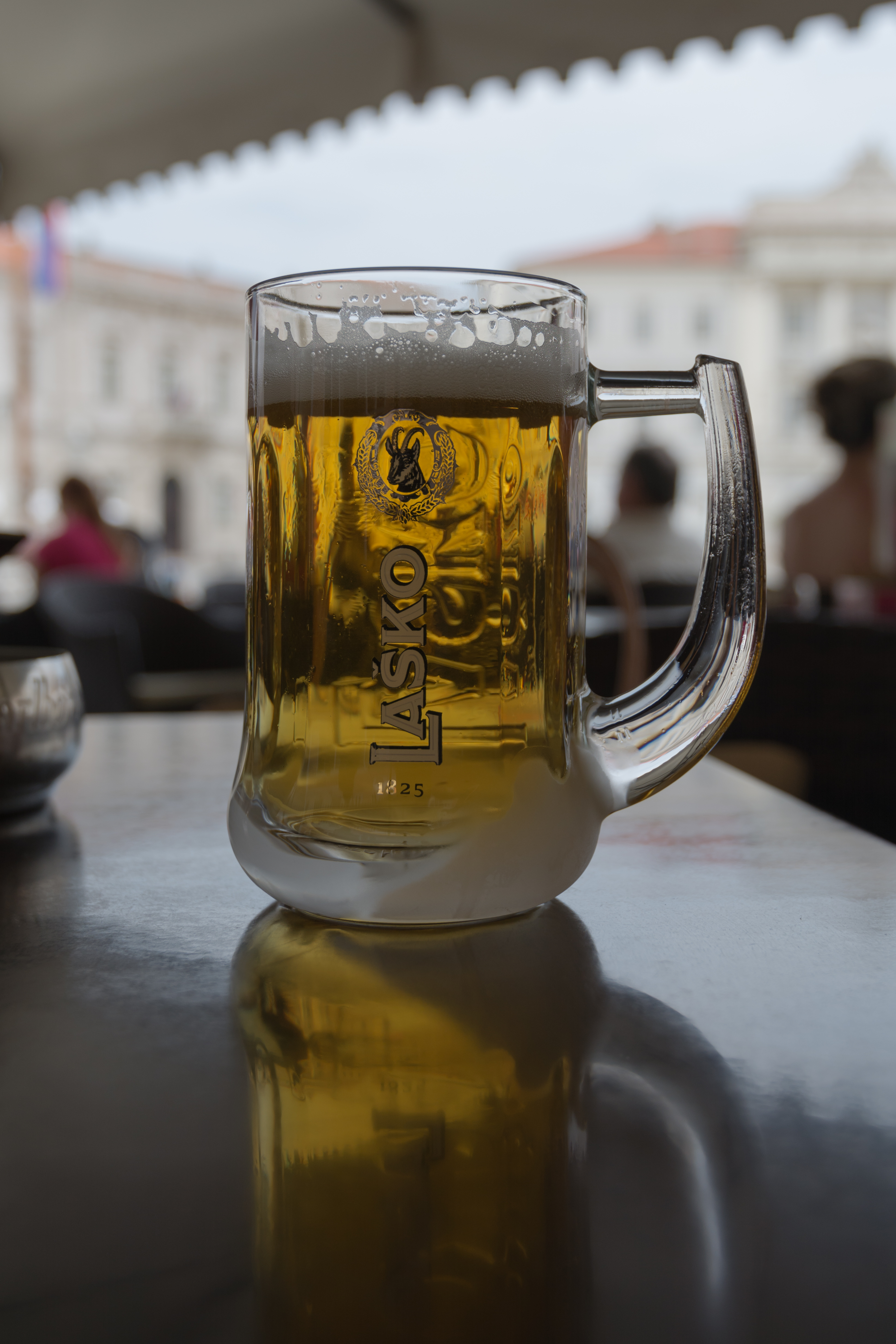
Laško beer in a mug

The brewery was founded in 1825 by Franz Geyer, a gingerbread baker and mead producer. After World War II ended in 1945, Laško was the fifth-largest in Yugoslavia, and by 1991 it was the largest among 28 Yugoslav breweries. It lost much of the Yugoslav market in 1991 after Slovenia declared independence and during the resulting Ten-Day War, although sales rebounded during the 1990s.

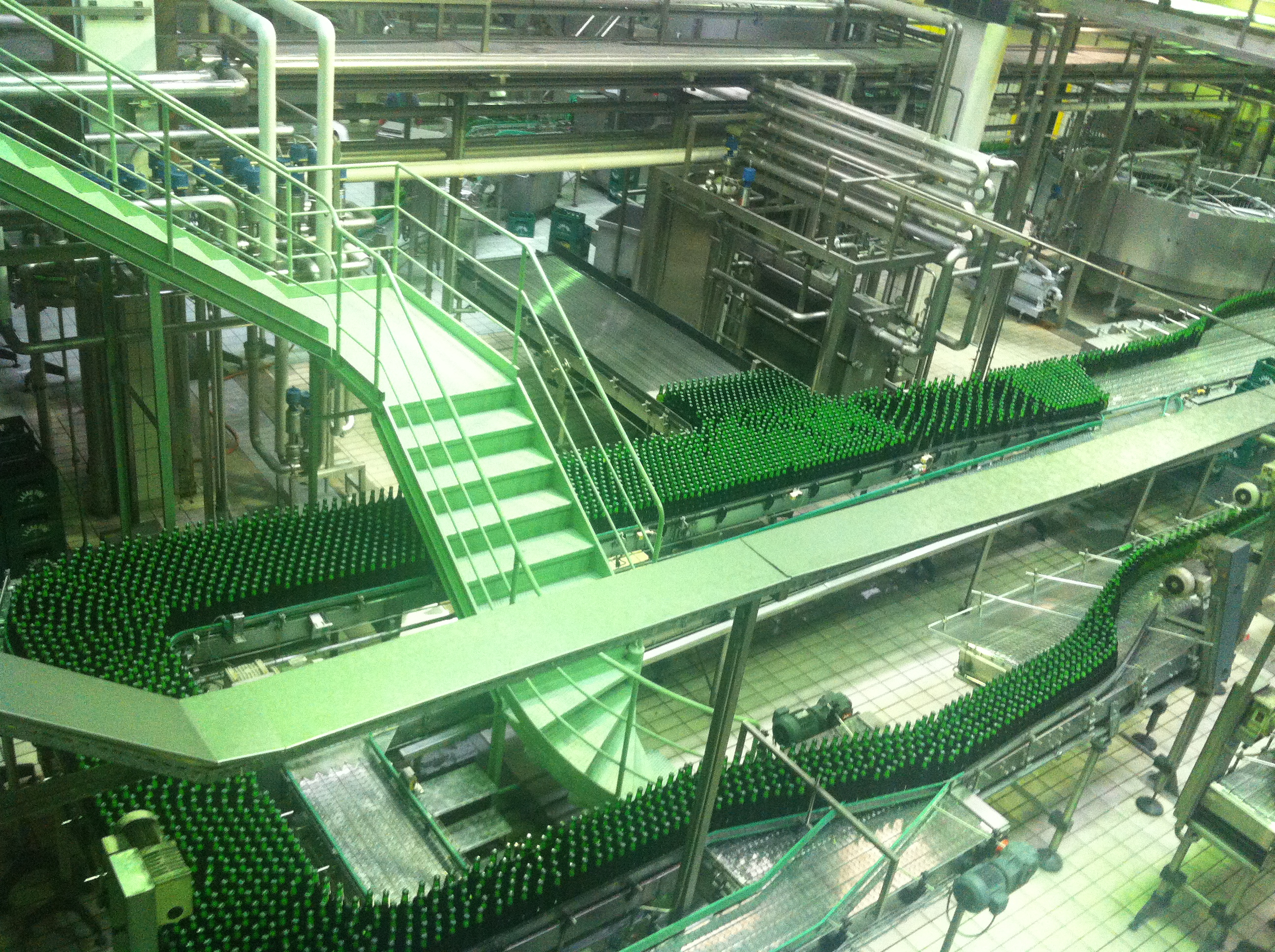
Beer filling line

In 2016 Laško and Union were formally merged into Pivovarna Laško Union d.d. under the Owner Heineken.

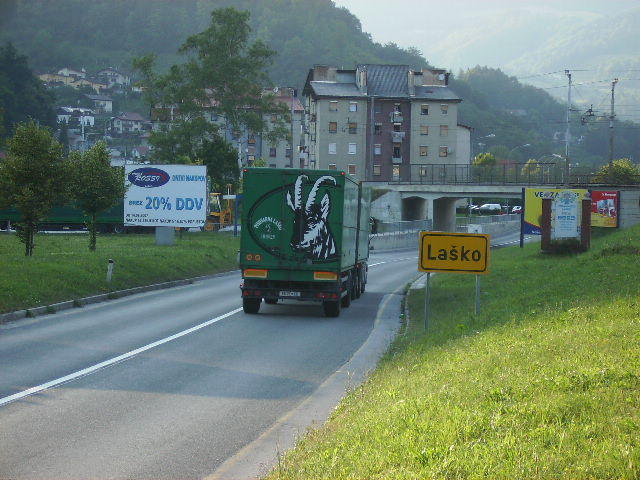
Laško truck entering the town after which it was named

== History of brewing in Laško ==
In 1825, the physician and lecturer Franz Geyer set up a craft brewery in the former Valvasor Hospital (1st location – today's Hotel Savinja), where the first brewer in Laško probably brewed stone beer (Steinbier), which was otherwise known in Carinthia, for thirteen years. However, it is not known whether he did not know how to make technologically more demanding Bavarian beer as well.

In 1838, the brewery was bought by Heinrich August Uhlich, who gave Laško beer a real reputation. As the owner of the bathhouse in Rimske Toplice, he served his beer to foreign guests and, due to his origin in Trieste, drove it to Trieste, a commercial center with connoisseurs of good food and drink. He also proved to be an enterprising wholesaler, as his beer was drunk even in Alexandria and Calcutta.

The next owner, Anton Larisch, built a new brewery in 1867 at the foot of St. Kristofa and Šmihel (2nd location – former Volna), which at the time was the largest in Lower Styria. He was famous for the fact that he personally controlled the quality of the beer and even improved it, and he also increased the capacity of the brewery.

In 1889, the brewery was bought by Simon Kukec, a brewer from Žal, a strongly Slovene-oriented nationalist. Because he was a good organizer, financier, businessman, and on top of that he was particularly fond of innovations, he is considered the most important figure in the history of the Laško brewery. He established a new type of beer and the first beer brand – thermal beer, which still lives today in its derivative form. Through many experiments, he found that thermal water improves the taste of beer. As a good entrepreneur, he was aware of the need to attract customers with unusual innovations. Therefore, he started to brew thermal beer as light and dark, and in both cases it was also stronger than ordinary beer.

== Brands ==
Laško

- Zlatorog
- Eliksir
- Dark
- Light
- Jubilejnik
- Club
- Trim
- Malt
- Radler

Bandidos

- Cuba Libre
- Ice
- Tequila
- Sun

iC Cider

Oda water

The brewery participates in the annual summertime Festival of Beer & Flowers (Pivo-Cvetje) in Laško, one of the most popular events for tourists in the country.
