= XCOM (disambiguation) =

XCOM is a science fiction video game series.

XCOM may also refer to:

- XCOM (board game), a board game based on the video game franchise
- NICER § XCOM, a NASA X-ray communications experiment
- XCOM Data Transport, a file transfer computer program
- XCOMM, a hardcore punk band from Venice Beach, California

== See also ==
- X.com (disambiguation)
- EXCOMM
