= Fairleigh Dickinson University =

Private university in Teaneck, New Jersey, US

- Former names: Fairleigh Dickinson Junior College (1942–1948); Fairleigh Dickinson College (1948–1956)
- Motto: Fortiter et Suaviter (Latin)
- Motto in English: "Strongly and Gently"
- Type: Private university
- Established: 1942; 84 years ago
- Accreditation: MSCHE
- Academic affiliations: Sea-grant
- Endowment: $107.2 million (2025)
- President: Michael J. Avaltroni (since April 2023)
- Provost: Benjamin Rifkin
- Location: Teaneck, New Jersey, United States; 40.91774°N 74.030°W
- Campus: 178 acres (72 ha)
- Other campuses: Florham Park; Hackensack; Madison; Vancouver
- Colors: Burgundy and blue
- Nicknames: Knights; Devils
- Sporting affiliations: NCAA Division I – NEC; NCAA Division III – MAC
- Mascots: Knightro; Ian the Devil
- Website: fdu.edu

Fairleigh Dickinson University (/ˈfɛərli/) is a private university with its main campuses in New Jersey, located in Madison / Florham Park and in Teaneck / Hackensack. Founded in 1942, it offers more than 100 degree programs. In addition to two campuses in New Jersey, the university has a campus in Vancouver, British Columbia, Canada; one in Wroxton, Oxfordshire, United Kingdom; and an online platform. It is New Jersey's largest private institution of higher education, with over 12,000 students.

== History ==
Fairleigh Dickinson University was founded as the Fairleigh Dickinson Junior College in 1942 as a junior college by Peter Sammartino and wife Sally, and was named after early benefactor Colonel Fairleigh S. Dickinson, co-founder of Becton Dickinson. Its original campus was located in Rutherford, New Jersey. By 1948, Fairleigh Dickinson Junior College expanded its curriculum to offer a four-year program when the GI Bill and veterans' money encouraged it to redesignate itself as Fairleigh Dickinson College. In that same year, the school received accreditation from the Middle States Association of Colleges and Schools.

In 1953, Fairleigh Dickinson College merged with the 400-student Bergen Junior College, acquiring its campus in Teaneck. At the time of the merger, Fairleigh Dickinson had more than 2,800 students and would be able to accommodate a total enrollment of 4,000 with its two campuses.

In 1956, the institution was recognized as Fairleigh Dickinson University by the New Jersey State Board of Education. In 1958, the university acquired the former Twombly-Vanderbilt estate in Madison and Florham Park, New Jersey, to serve as its third campus. Fairleigh Dickinson University is a member of the National Association of Independent Colleges and Universities.

Landscape architect Frederick Law Olmsted, the designer of Central Park, had designed the landscape for the Twombly-Vanderbilt estate (now the Florham Campus). The main house of the Twombly-Vanderbilt estate, now Hennessy Hall, was designed by architectural firm McKim, Mead, and White in the Georgian Revival style. The mansion was completed in 1897 and was modeled after the wing of Hampton Court Palace designed by architect Sir Christopher Wren. The Friends of Florham, founded in 1990 by Emma Joy Dana, university librarian James Fraser, and a group of friends and colleagues works with the mission of advising and assisting the administration and board of trustees in the care, maintenance, and preservation of the Twombly Estate, known as "Florham".

=== Presidents ===
President	Term
Peter Sammartino	1942–1968
J. Osborn Fuller	1968–1974
Jerome M. Pollack	1974–1983
Walter T. Savage*	1983–1984
Robert H. Donaldson	1984–1990
Francis J. Mertz	1990–1999
J. Michael Adams	1999–2012
Sheldon Drucker	2012–2016
Christopher A. Capuano	2016–2022
Michael J. Avaltroni	2022–present

* indicates those who served only as an acting or interim president.

== Campuses ==
Fairleigh Dickinson University has four campuses: two in New Jersey (Madison / Florham Park and Teaneck / Hackensack), one in Vancouver, and one in South East England, as well as an online platform.

=== Florham Campus ===
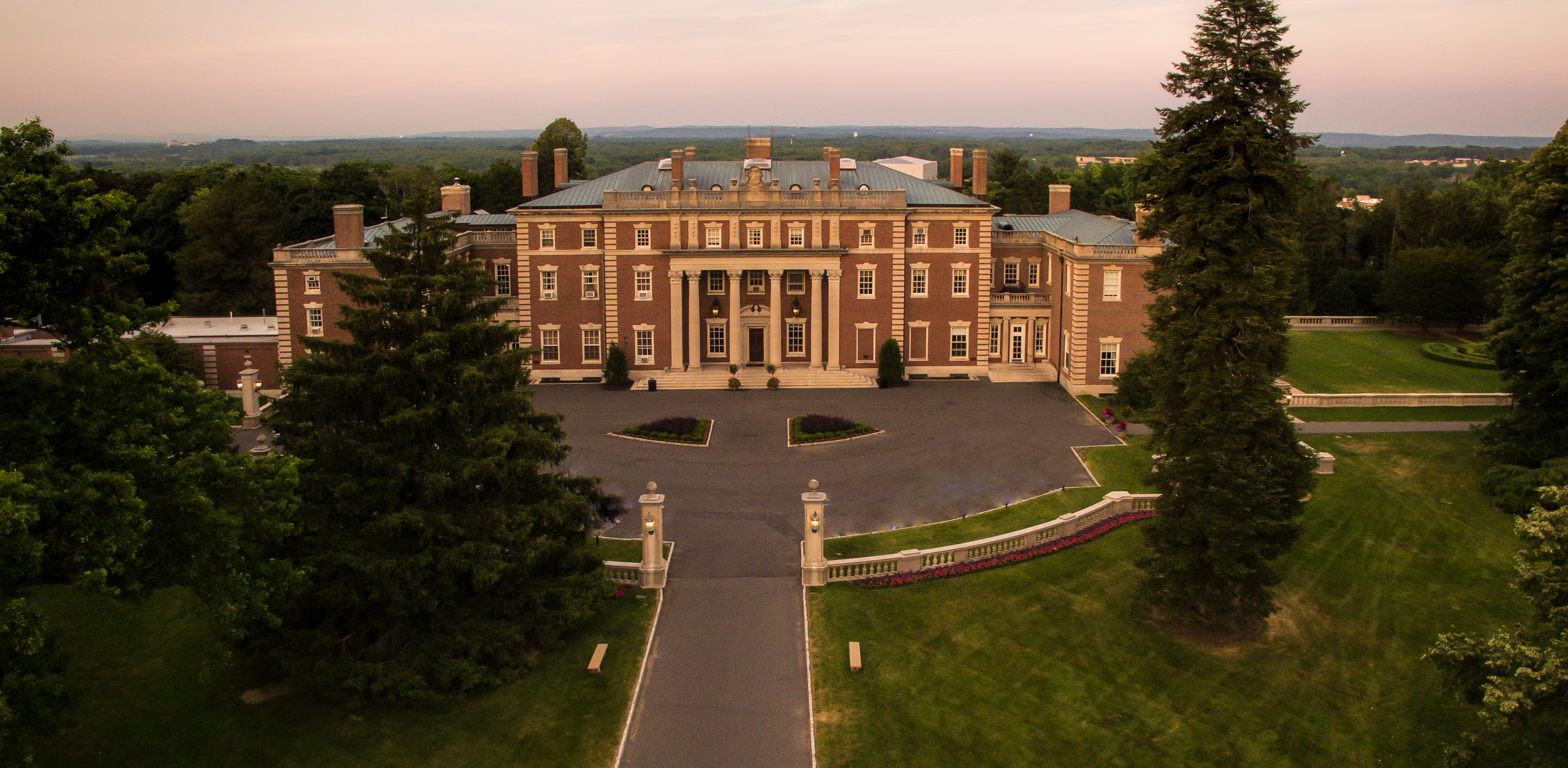
The Vanderbilt-Twombly mansion, centerpiece of FDU's Florham Campus

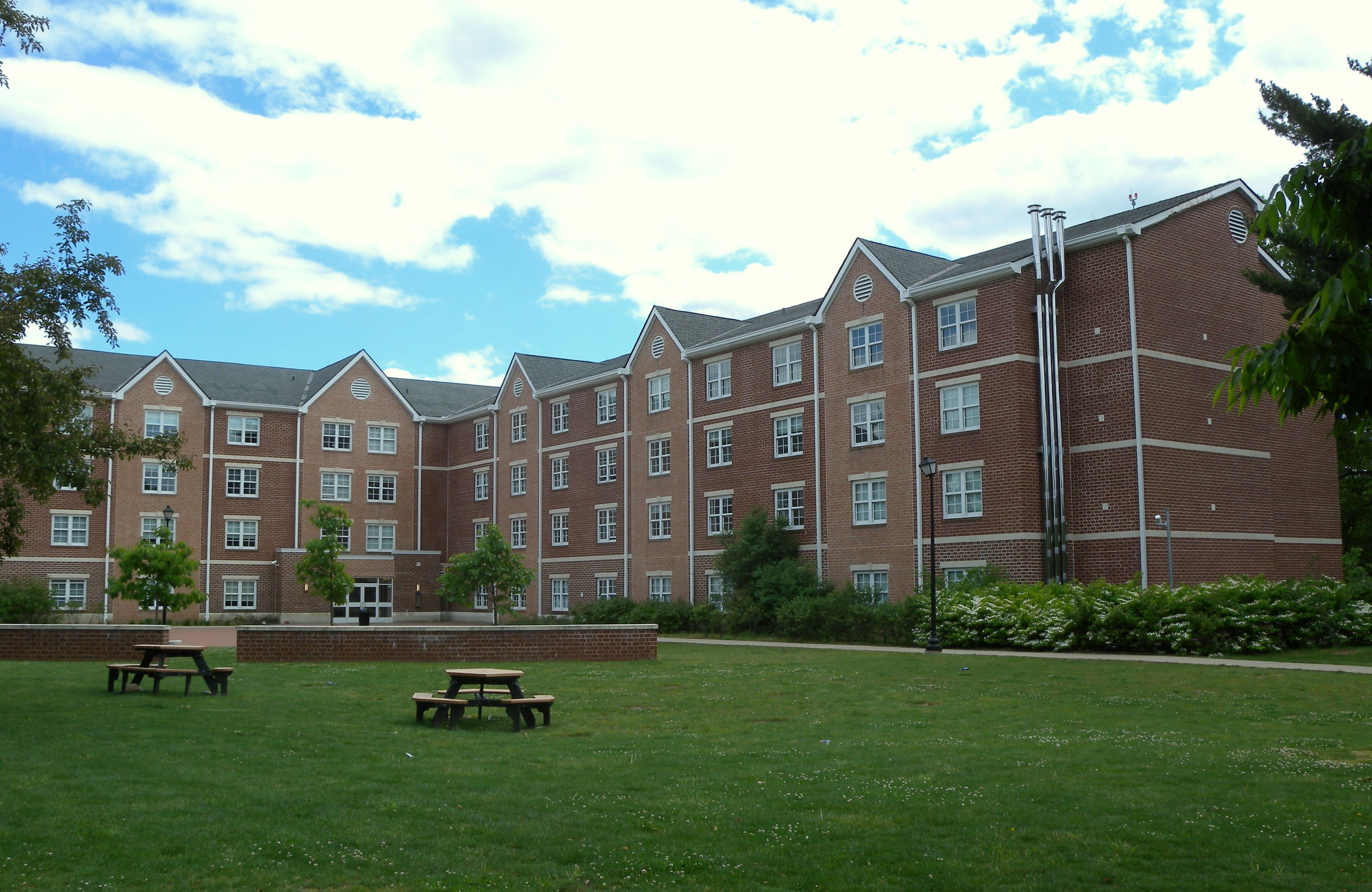
Dormitory at Florham Campus

The Florham Campus is located in the suburban towns of Madison and Florham Park, New Jersey, on the grounds of the former Florham estate of Hamilton McKown Twombly (1849–1910) and his wife, Florence Adele Vanderbilt Twombly (1854–1952), a member of the wealthy Vanderbilt family.

The Florham Campus finished construction on the John and Joan Monninger Center for Learning and Research. It opened during the spring 2013 semester. In Fall 2024, the Florham Campus had a total enrollment of 2,885, including 2,012 undergraduates, 83 undergraduate transfers and graduate enrollment of 873.

=== Metropolitan Campus ===
The Metropolitan Campus is located close to New York City and spans the Hackensack River in the New Jersey municipalities of Teaneck and Hackensack. The campus has a greater focus on business and professional majors compared to the Florham Campus. In Fall 2024, the Metropolitan Campus had a total enrollment of 8,045, including 5,690 undergraduates, 156 undergraduate transfers and graduate enrollment of 2,355. About 21% of Metropolitan Campus students are minority and international students. Approximately one thousand students live on campus in the residence halls.

=== Vancouver Campus ===
FDU's Vancouver Campus is located at 842 Cambie Street and 89 West Georgia Street in Vancouver, British Columbia. It opened in 2007.

=== Former campuses ===
In addition to the present campuses, Fairleigh Dickinson University previously operated campuses in Rutherford, New Jersey (where the university was founded in 1942), in Saint Croix, U.S. Virgin Islands, and Wroxton, UK. Operations on the Rutherford Campus were merged with the Metropolitan Campus in 1993. The Rutherford Campus was sold to Felician College in 1997. The West Indies Laboratory which opened in 1972 was damaged beyond repair during Hurricane Hugo in 1989 and was closed shortly afterwards in 1990.

Fairleigh Dickinson University's Wroxton College was located in Wroxton, Oxfordshire, in South East England. When Fairleigh Dickinson University acquired Wroxton Abbey in 1965, FDU became the first American university to own and operate a campus outside of the United States. Although Wroxton College dates to the 18th century, the housing had been modernized. In November 2025, the university announced that the 56-acre (23 ha) Wroxton campus would be sold to a group of alumni.

== Academics ==
Fairleigh Dickinson's national student body consists of a total 10,899 students, 8,461 of whom are undergraduates, with the remaining 2,438 being graduate students with a full-time equivalence (FTE) of 7,434, making it the largest private institution in the state of New Jersey. FDU has over 1,100 international students from approximately 17 countries around the world, ranking it 15th nationally among their Carnegie peer group. The majority of international students attend the Metropolitan Campus and FDU's Vancouver Campus, which was founded primarily to educate international students. The Vancouver Campus is the first U.S.–owned and operated institution in British Columbia to receive University status.

The university is ranked 44th by U.S. News & World Report Best Colleges 2022 Regional University rankings (North).

Demographics of student body as of fall 2015
	African-American	Asian-American	Caucasian	Hispanic	Female
Undergraduate	18.9%	7.6%	58.7%	23%	59%
Graduate	14.5%	14.5%	60.7%	10.8%	46.8%

Fairleigh Dickinson consists of six academic colleges: Maxwell Becton College of Liberal Arts and Education; Silberman College of Business; Gregory H. Olsen College of Engineering and Science; Henry P. Becton College of Nursing and Allied Health; College of Pharmacy and Health Sciences; and the Marion Turpan College of Psychology and Counseling.

=== Maxwell Becton College of Liberal Arts and Education ===
Fairleigh Dickinson's Becton College offers more than 60 undergraduate majors to its full- and part-time students.

=== Silberman College of Business ===
The Silberman College of Business is a tri-campus college of Fairleigh Dickinson University. It offers graduate and undergraduate degrees at the Florham Campus, the Metropolitan campus, and offers bachelor's degree studies in Business Management and Information Technology at the FDU-Vancouver campus.

FDU offers AACSB-accredited graduate and undergraduate business degrees through its Silberman College of Business. Fairleigh Dickinson's Silberman College of Business was ranked as one of the top 295 business schools in the country for 2014 by The Princeton Review.

Fairleigh Dickinson University's International School of Hospitality and Tourism Management features the US national headquarters of the international gastronomic society Confrérie de la Chaîne des Rôtisseurs located at the Chaîne House on the Florham Campus.

=== Graduate studies ===
Graduate programs are offered at all four of the university's campuses, and a number are offered solely through online delivery, including a postdoctoral MS in clinical psychopharmacology (MSCP) through the Marion Turpan College of Psychology and Counseling. Graduate studies include the Doctor of Pharmacy (PharmD) offered by the College of Pharmacy and Health Sciences, the Doctor of Nursing Practice (DNP), the Doctor of Philosophy (PhD) in clinical psychology, the Doctor of Psychology (PsyD) in school psychology, and a large number of master's degree programs, including the Master of Public Administration (MPA) and an MA in global affairs offered to nearby consular and diplomatic staff.

==== FDU College of Pharmacy ====
In 2012, Fairleigh Dickinson opened New Jersey's first school of pharmacy associated with a private higher education institution, at the Florham Campus. It is the second pharmacy school in New Jersey and the first to open in the state in over 120 years.

==== FDU School of Public and Global Affairs ====
After a major gift from alumnus James Orefice in 2017, Fairleigh Dickinson formed a new graduate School of Public and Global Affairs comprising the Master of Public Administration, the Master of Administrative Science, the M.A. in Global Affairs, the M.S. in Cyber and Homeland Security Administration, the Master of Arts in Higher Education Administration, and the survey research group, PublicMind.

=== FDU Libraries ===
The university maintains libraries on all four of its campuses. Between the two libraries and one archive located at FDU's Florham and Metropolitan campuses, the university library system holds over 450,000 titles.

The Florham Campus library is part of the John and Joan Monninger Center for Learning and Research. A portion of the library is housed in the old Orangerie of the Twombly-Vanderbilt estate which was built in the 1890s by McKim, Mead, and White.

The Metropolitan campus features the Metropolitan Library and the North Jersey Heritage Center (an archival collection of New Jersey books, documents, maps, newspapers and reference material, as well as FDU history). The New Jersey collection began in 1961 when FDU became one of the earliest participants in the New Jersey Document Program listed as fourth in precedence out of 80 depositories behind the Council of State Government, Rutgers University and the NJ State Library. The Metropolitan Library holds the Columbia Pictures Archive, a collection of over 230 movies from the Columbia Pictures Studios on 16mm film. The archive was given by Columbia in the 1980s to FDU through the work of Jack Kells, FDU alum and former Columbia executive.

== Athletics ==
In intercollegiate athletics, the Metropolitan Campus competes in NCAA Division I, while the Florham Campus competes in Division III, making it one of only a few schools in the United States to field both Division I and Division III teams. The teams at the Metropolitan Campus are known as the Knights, while the Florham Campus teams are known as the Devils.

On March 17, 2023, the Fairleigh Dickinson University men's basketball team became the second team in history to upset a 1 seed as a 16 seed against Purdue in the 2023 NCAA Division I men's basketball tournament.

=== Florham Campus – NCAA Division III ===
The FDU Florham Campus sports teams are called the Devils. They are in the National Collegiate Athletic Association (NCAA) Division III and the Eastern College Athletic Conference (ECAC) and they compete in the Middle Atlantic Conferences' (MAC) MAC Freedom. Their mascot is Ian the Devil. The women's basketball team won the national collegiate basketball championship in the year 2013–2014. The women's basketball team also made it to the NCAA tournament four times in a row, from 2012 to 2016.

== PublicMind ==
Fairleigh Dickinson University's PublicMind is an independent research group that conducts public opinion polling and other research on politics, society, popular culture, consumer behavior and economic trends. PublicMind associates undertake scientific survey research for corporations, non-profits, and government agencies as well as for the public interest, as well as information regarding the FDU community as a whole.

== Notable alumni ==
- Stephanie Adams (1970–2018), model and writer
- Alejandro Bedoya (born 1987), professional soccer player (did not graduate)
- Brenda Blackmon, television news anchor
- Ron Blomberg (born 1948), professional baseball player
- Lisa Blunt Rochester (born 1962), Delaware politician
- Mensun Bound (born 1953), British marine archaeologist
- Ron Brill, co-founder of Home Depot
- Tomer Chencinski (born 1984), Israeli-Canadian professional soccer player
- Katlyn Chookagian (born 1988), professional mixed martial artist
- Richard Codey (1946–2026), New Jersey politician
- Michael Doniloski (born 1988), Head of Internal Audit, Agora. Average accountant.
- Darnell Edge (born 1997), professional basketball player in the Israeli Basketball Premier League
- Nicholas Felice (born 1927), New Jersey politician
- Marcus Gaither (1961–2020), American-French professional basketball player
- Charles A. Gargano (born 1934), former U.S. ambassador to Trinidad and Tobago and chairman of the Empire State Development Corporation
- Gilbert M. Gaul (born 1951), Pulitzer Prize-winning journalist
- John Gottman (born 1942), professor emeritus of Psychology at the University of Washington
- Reinaldo Marcus Green (born 1981), filmmaker and writer
- Seth Greenberg (born 1956), college basketball coach and television sports personality
- Mike Hall (born 1989), bassist
- Sung-Mo Kang, president of Korea Advanced Institute of Science and Technology
- Jim Keogh (born 1948), author
- Eleanor Kieliszek (1925–2017; B.A. 1979), politician, first female mayor of Teaneck, New Jersey
- Garry Kitchen (born 1955; B.S. 1980), video game pioneer
- Stewart Krentzman, president and CEO of Oki Data Americas, Inc.
- John Legere (born 1958), CEO of T-Mobile
- William Leiss, president of the Royal Society of Canada from 1999 to 2001 and Officer of the Order of Canada
- Jacob Lissek (born 1992), professional soccer player
- Yahya Maroofi, secretary general of the Economic Cooperation Organization
- George Martin (born 1953), professional football player
- D. Bennett Mazur (1924–1994), New Jersey politician
- Danielle McEwan (born 1991), professional bowler
- John J. Mooney (1930–2020), co-inventor of the three-way catalytic converter and co-winner of National Medal of Technology
- Vince Naimoli (1937–2019), founder and chair of the Tampa Bay Rays
- Peggy Noonan (born 1950), columnist, author, and speechwriter for Ronald Reagan
- Christine O'Donnell (born 1969), 2010 Republican nominee for U.S. senator from Delaware
- Gregory Olsen (born 1945), entrepreneur and astronaut
- Mel Schrieberg (1942–2017), co-founder of Election.com, running the only major public sector election ever run on the Internet, the Arizona Democratic primary in March 2000
- John Spencer, actor (did not graduate)
- Stephen Spiro, Vietnam War opponent and conscientious objector who was pardoned by Gerald Ford
- Dennis Strigl (born 1946), president and COO of Verizon Communications
- Guy Talarico, New Jersey politician
- Rahshon Turner (born 1975), professional basketball player
- Jeff Van Drew (born 1953), New Jersey politician
- Ben Weinman (born 1975), musician
- Sara Whalen (born 1976), Olympic soccer player
- Zygi Wilf (born 1950), billionaire real estate developer and owner of the Minnesota Vikings football team
- Perry Williams (born 1961), professional football player
- Bill Willoughby (born 1957), professional basketball official
- Darren Young (born 1983), professional wrestler
- Gerald H. Zecker (born 1942), New Jersey politician
FDU notable alumni

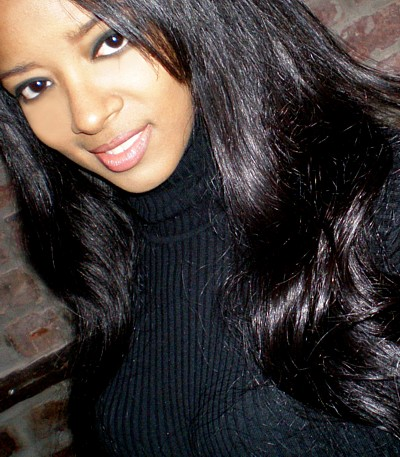
Stephanie Adams

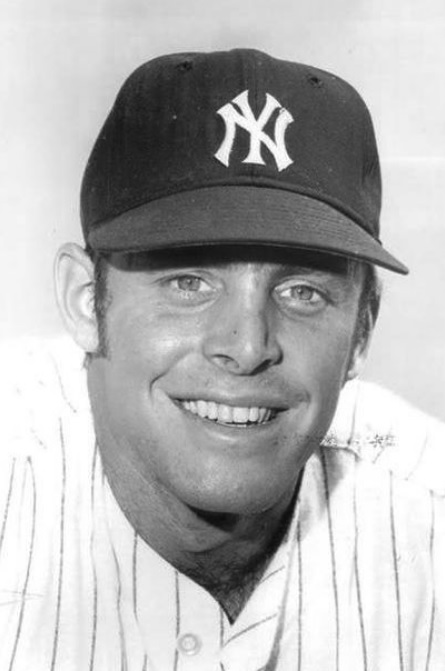
Ron Blomberg

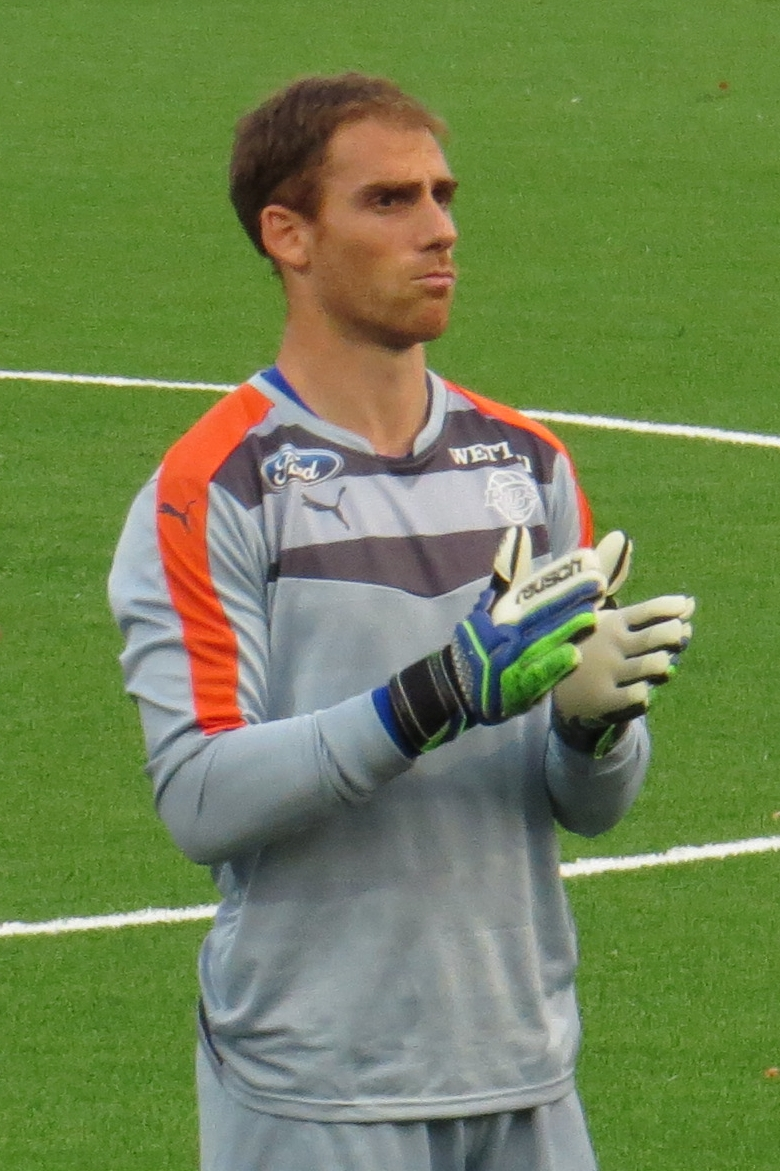
Tomer Chencinski

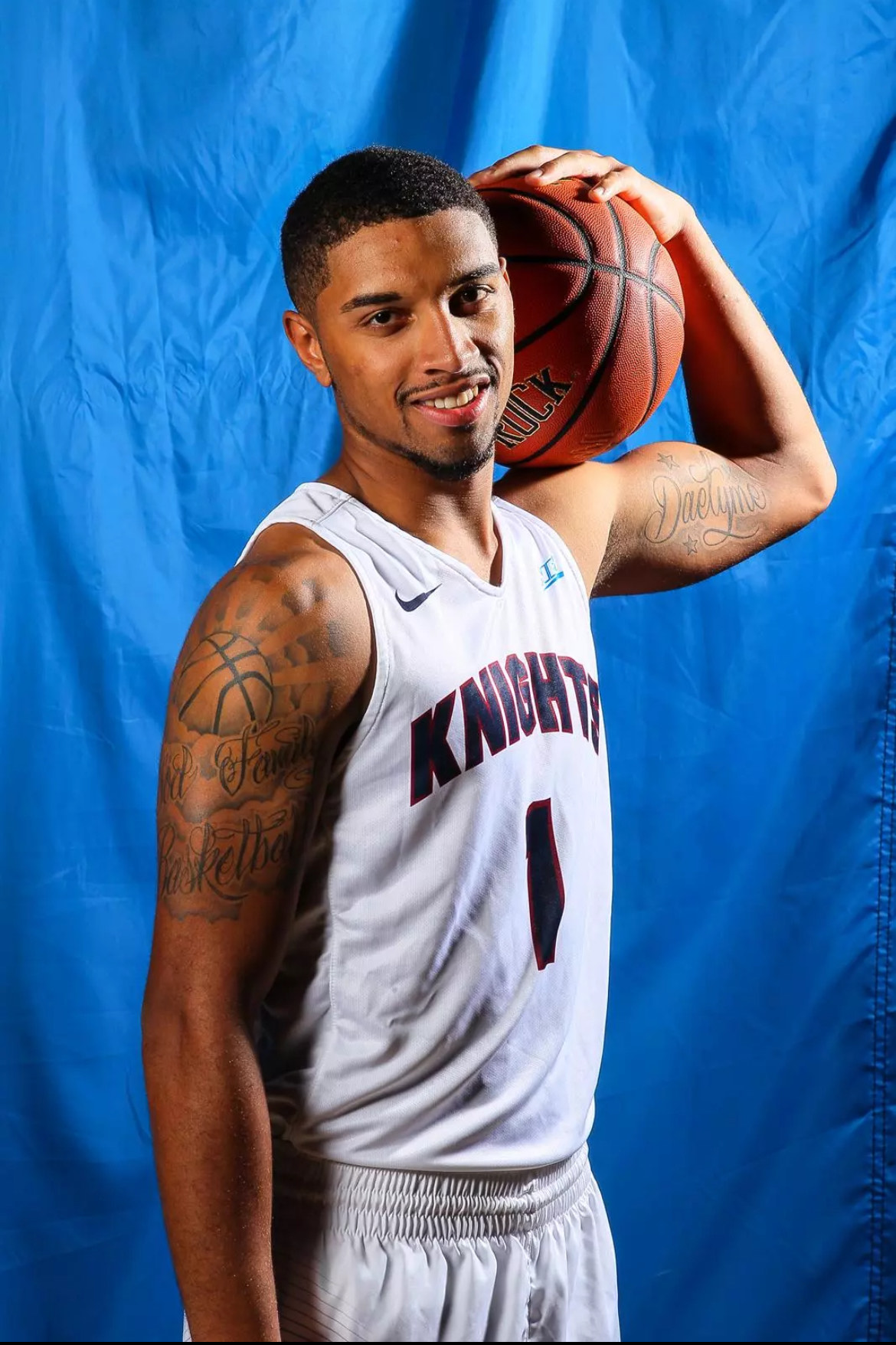
Darnell Edge

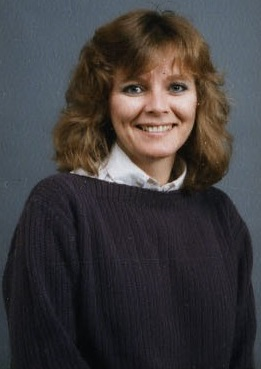
Peggy Noonan

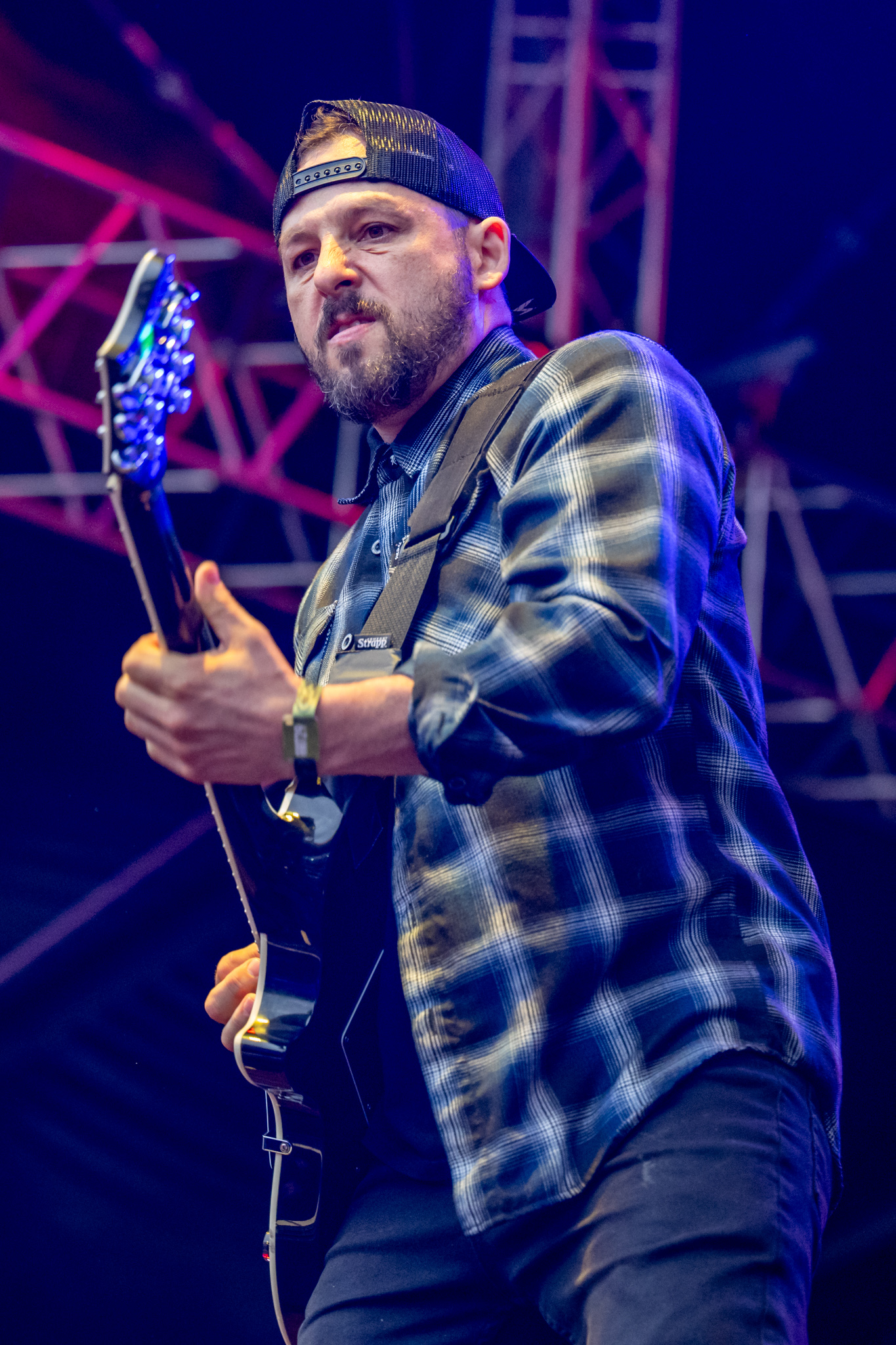
Ben Weinman
