= Neocortex AI =

Neocortex Robotics, Inc.
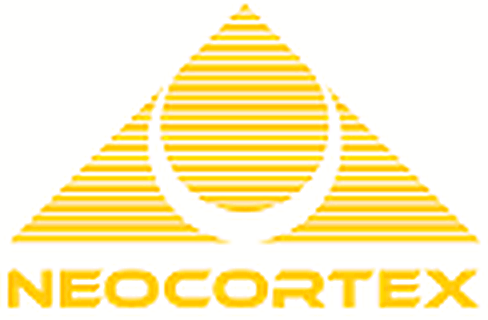
- Formerly: Universal Robotics, Inc. Universal Logic
- Industry: Automation; software; artificial intelligence; machine vision
- Founded: September 13, 2021; 5 years ago in Delaware
- Founder: David Peters
- Headquarters: Nashville, Tennessee, U.S.
- Key people: Joe Mohen, Chairman; David A. Peters, COO; Nick Buchta, President; Goutham Mallapragada, CTO
- Products: Neocortex Pick, Neocortex Inspect, Neocortex Sort, Neocortex Palletizer
- Website: universallogic.com

Neocortex Robotics, Inc., formerly Universal Robotics, Inc. and trading as Universal Logic, Inc., is an American artificial intelligence software company headquartered in Nashville, Tennessee. The company develops software that enables commercially available industrial robots to carry out materials-handling work in warehouses and distribution centers, including picking, inspection, sortation and palletizing.

The Neocortex platform originated in robotics research carried out at Vanderbilt University in connection with NASA's Robonaut program. The technology was developed starting in 2008 from a research project. The present company was incorporated in Delaware on 13 September 2021 under the name Universal Robotics, Inc. and acquired the assets of the earlier business; it adopted the name Neocortex Robotics, Inc. in June 2026.

== History ==
=== Research origins ===
The technology underlying Neocortex originated in work by Richard Alan Peters II, an associate professor of electrical engineering at Vanderbilt University, carried out in connection with NASA's Robonaut program. From 2001, NASA's Johnson Space Center sought software that would allow a robot to learn rather than be programmed for each task, and worked with DARPA and researchers at Vanderbilt, the University of Massachusetts, the Massachusetts Institute of Technology and the University of Southern California.

Peters's approach gave a robot an "egosphere", a geodesic structure organizing sensory input by time and spatial direction, together with a component that analyzed the sensory signals the robot received alongside the movements it made. Connecting those patterns by similarity allowed the robot to adjust to changes in the size, orientation, position or lighting of the objects it handled, which conventional industrial robots required reprogramming to accommodate. The component was named after the neocortex region of the brain.

Vanderbilt applied for and obtained a patent on the method, described by the university as the first patent issued on the architecture of robot intelligence. Peters and his brother David formed a company, licensed the patent from the university and began operating from a garage near Nashville International Airport. The patent carried nineteen claims. Alan Peters was a co-founder and chief technology officer in the company's early years, while on leave from the university. The research also produced Spatial Vision, a machine vision system developed to give the software sight.

=== Automation Research 2008–2020 ===
The research team was established in Nashville in 2008 by brothers David and Alan Peters to develop the Neocortex platform and bring prototypes to market. David Peters was the project leader. It released Spatial Vision, a self-calibrating three-dimensional machine vision system, and launched the Neocortex control software in 2010. The resulting three-dimensional vision guidance system was reported to be in use by several Fortune 200 companies to seal shipping boxes of varying shapes, including shapes the system had not previously encountered.

In 2013 the company introduced a depalletization application intended to handle cartons of varying size and condition without prior analysis. In 2017 it expanded its line of Neocortex Goods to Robot (G2R) Cells — prefabricated robotic work cells designed to be installed into existing production lines — and formed Universal Logic, Inc. to market its general-purpose artificial intelligence software. In 2018 it released a self-service version of the software.

=== Neocortex Robotics, 2021–present ===
The present company was incorporated in Delaware in 2021 as Universal Robotics, Inc., with David Peters as the incorporator, and acquired the assets of the earlier business.

The company announced a partnership with the Chinese autonomous mobile robot manufacturer Geek+, combining Geek+'s mobile robots with the Neocortex platform in what the two described as a "goods-to-robot" approach, extending existing goods-to-person warehouse workflows.

In November 2021 the company announced an agreement with Associated Wholesale Grocers for installations of the Neocortex Pallet Sorter at several of the wholesaler's distribution centers.

On 24 June 2026 the corporation filed a certificate of amendment with the Delaware Secretary of State changing its name to Neocortex Robotics, Inc.

The company develops software products for warehouse materials handling addressing piece and case picking, inspection of product and packaging condition, sortation, and mixed-product palletizing.

== Technology ==
The Neocortex platform combines machine vision, machine learning and motion control, so that a robot can identify objects, plan a sequence of physical actions and carry them out in real time. The platform is hardware- and sensor-independent, operating with industrial robots from a range of manufacturers. Components have included Spatial Vision, a three-dimensional vision, calibration and communication system, and Deep Eye learning algorithms used for real-time control. Trade coverage in 2021 reported the software as hardware-agnostic and capable of picking and placing up to 1,400 cycles per hour.

== Industry context ==
Adoption of warehouse automation in the United States has been driven substantially by difficulty staffing warehouse work. A 2024 survey by Descartes Systems Group found that 76% of supply chain and logistics operations reported notable workforce shortages, with warehouse operations among the functions most affected. Warehouse work has been among the hardest categories of employment to fill: Instawork's 2025 State of the Warehouse Industry reported that close to 500,000 warehouse and logistics positions remained open in the United States, with pick-and-pack roles, forklift operators and shift leads the most difficult to staff. The Bureau of Labor Statistics has recorded annual turnover among warehouse workers of roughly 36%, and understaffed facilities have been associated with higher error rates and greater reliance on inexperienced workers. The 2025 MHI Annual Industry Report, produced with Deloitte, found that 45% of supply chain leaders planned to purchase automated solutions and that 83% expected to adopt robotics and automation within five years.

== Awards ==
The company has been named to Robotics Business Review's RBR50 list of the most notable robotics companies in the world.

== Leadership ==
Joe Mohen was appointed executive chairman in July 2026. Co-founder David A. Peters, who previously was chief executive officer, is chief operating officer.
