= Stephanie Adams =

American model and murderer (1970–2018)

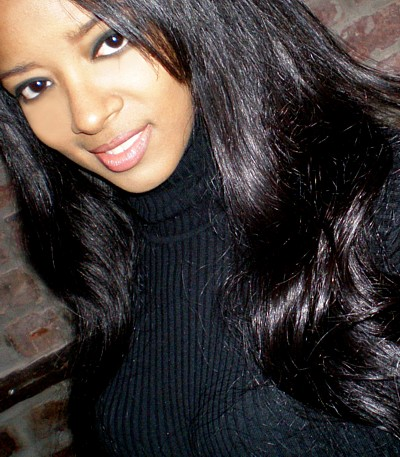
- Adams in 2008
- Born: July 24, 1970; Orange, New Jersey, U.S.
- Died: c. May 18, 2018 (aged 47); New York City, U.S.
- Cause of death: Suicide by jumping
- Resting place: Saint John's Cemetery; New Rockford, North Dakota, U.S.
- Spouse: Charles V. Nicholai (m. 2010; sep. 2017)
- Children: 1

Playboy centerfold appearance
- November 1992
- Preceded by: Tiffany Sloan
- Succeeded by: Barbara Moore

Personal details
- Height: 5 ft 9 in (1.75 m)
- Criminal information

Details
- Victims: Vincent Adams
- Date: c. May 18, 2018
- Country: United States
- State: New York

Stephanie Adams (July 24, 1970 – c. May 18, 2018) was an American model, author, and murderer. She was Playboy Playmate of the Month for November 1992.

On May 18, 2018, Adams killed herself and her seven-year-old son in a murder-suicide. According to the New York City Police Department, she pushed her son out of a 25th-story balcony, before jumping herself.

== Early life ==
Adams was born in Orange, New Jersey, and was raised by her aunts Joyce and Pearl, former models who encouraged her to begin modeling at the age of 16. She was of African American, Euro-American, and Cherokee ancestry, and claimed to be a direct descendant of Presidents John Adams and John Quincy Adams.

== Career ==
Adams graduated from Ophelia DeVore School of Charm and began a career as a model, appearing in photo shoots for Seventeen magazine, Venus Swimwear, and commercial advertisements for Clairol. She appeared as "Miss November 1992" in Playboy magazine while modeling for Wilhelmina Models. She later moved to Elite Model Management after becoming engaged to its CEO, John Casablancas.

Adams earned a bachelor's degree from Fairleigh Dickinson University in 1992. She made a cameo appearance for the "Top 10" list on the Late Show with David Letterman on November 20, 2003, to commemorate the 50th anniversary of Playboy magazine. She appeared on the cover of The Village Voice in 2005.

In 1999, Adams founded Goddessy, according to her a portmanteau of "goddess" and "odyssey". She published her first book in 2003 and started her own publishing company in 2007. Following the death of her aunt from breast cancer in 2003, she dedicated more of her time to writing. That same year, she published a book dedicated to her deceased aunt titled He Only Takes the Best, followed by another book written in honor of her elderly Aunt Pearl titled Guardian. Adams produced about two dozen metaphysical books, astrology calendars and a tarot card set marketed under the Goddessy brand. She also published a novel titled Empress in 2004, featuring women in ancient Rome.

Adams was founder and CEO of the skin care product company Goddessy Organics. With her husband, she was co-owner of Wall Street Chiropractic and Wellness.

== Personal life ==
Early in her career, Adams was married to an Italian investment banker, but later divorced. In a February 2003 She magazine cover story, Adams came out as a lesbian, the first Playmate to do so. In their 2004 "Best of" feature, The Village Voice declared her the "Best lesbian sex symbol", saying it was "hard to turn a page in a queer rag without seeing the willowy model peeking out in a bikini, or nothing at all". However, in 2009, Adams announced that she was engaged to marry a man, and about the same time, described herself in an interview as straight. After her marriage in 2010 to Charles V. Nicholai, a Manhattan chiropractor, Adams said she was retiring from public life and would spend most of her time privately with her husband and son.

In May 2006, during a dispute over where to drop her off, a New York City taxi driver called the police and falsely reported that Adams was armed with a gun and had threatened to shoot him. The taxi driver's license was subsequently revoked and he was fined $2,700 for the incident. Adams alleged that during the incident police threw her to the ground, causing injuries to her neck and back. Adams filed a lawsuit against the New York City Police Department in 2006. In February 2012, a jury awarded her $1.2 million, $400,000 more than had been sought by her lawyer, but the judge later reduced it to $373,000. Adams stated that she had "no animosity toward the NYPD".

== Murder of Vincent Adams and suicide ==
Murder of Vincent Adams
- Location: Gotham Hotel, Manhattan, New York, U.S.
- Date: c. May 18, 2018 (EDT)
- Target: Vincent Adams
- Attack type: Murder–suicide, filicide, child murder
- Deaths: 2 (including the perpetrator)
- Perpetrator: Stephanie Adams
- Motive: Unknown (possibly related to custody battle)

On the evening of May 17, 2018, Adams checked into a 25th-floor penthouse in the Gotham Hotel on 46th Street in Manhattan with her seven-year-old son Vincent. The next morning, both were found dead on a second-floor balcony in the hotel's rear courtyard. According to law enforcement officials, Adams and her husband were involved in a custody battle, and hours before checking into the hotel, Adams told the New York Post that her husband and his lawyer were preventing her from taking her son on vacation. The New York City Chief Medical Examiner ruled Adams's death a suicide and that of her son a homicide.

== See also ==
- List of murdered American children
- Murder-suicide

Suzi Simpson	Tanya Beyer	Tylyn John	Cady Cantrell	Anna Nicole Smith	Angela Melini
Amanda Hope	Ashley Allen	Morena Corwin	Tiffany Sloan	Stephanie Adams	Barbara Moore
