= Single-letter second-level domain =

Specific short Internet domain names

Single-letter second-level domains are domains in which the second-level domain of the domain name consists of only one letter, such as x.com. In 1993, the Internet Assigned Numbers Authority (IANA) explicitly reserved all single-letter and single-digit second-level domains under the top-level domains com, net, and org, and grandfathered those that had already been assigned. In December 2005, ICANN considered auctioning these domain names.

== Active single-letter domains ==
On December 1, 1993, the Internet Assigned Numbers Authority (IANA) explicitly reserved the remaining single-letter and single-digit domain names. The few domains that were already assigned were grandfathered in and continued to exist.

=== ASCII single-character domains ===
The six single-letter domains in existence at that time under .com, .net and .org were the following:

Domain name	1993 owner	Current owner
i.net	INet Solutions Ltd	Saw.com
q.com	JG	Quality Technology Services
q.net	Privately owned	Privately owned
x.com	Marcel DePaolis & Dave Weinstein	X Corp. (subsidiary of xAI)
x.org	X Consortium	X.Org Foundation
z.com	HomePage.com	GMO Internet, Inc.

The .org TLD was subsequently reopened for single-letter domain registrations. These and selected other gTLD and ccTLD single-letter domain names currently in use, typically as shortcuts and URL shorteners, are listed below.

Domain name	Current user	Usage
0.email	Zero Email	
2.am	2am design	
2.ht		URL shortener
3.sv		URL shortener
3.ie	Three Ireland	
7.at	MeMail	
a.co	Amazon.com	URL shortcut for Amazon, generally used by Amazon in SMS messages for informing purchasers of activity on an order
a.sv		URL shortener
a.org		
b.et	Betting Exchange UK	
b.mw	BMW	URL shortcut for BMW
b.sk	Bike.sk	
b.tc	BTC Inc	
c.ai	character.ai	
c.cc	Brian Cartmell	Personal website
c.im		C.IM is a general, mainly English-speaking Mastodon instance.
c.org	Change.org	URL shortcut for change.org
d.gs	Dragonsayen	URL shortcut for dragonsayen.com (DraGonSayen)
d.tube	DTube	Video sharing platform with peer-to-peer capabilities
e.foundation	/e/ Foundation	Main website for /e/ Foundation and related software/services, including the /e/ operating system, an Android-based mobile operating system
e.im	MailTime	URL shortcut for MailTime Email Messenger
e.ml	e.ml	.eml (email) file viewer
e.rip	Alone Services	
e.srl	E-Group	Main website
e.sv	eMedia Foundation	Main website
f.org	FinTech Labs	
g.cn	Google	Google's official URL shortcut to help Chinese users locate Google
g.co	Google	Google's official URL shortcut
g.gl	Google	
g.gg		Global Grid Gallery
g.network	G.Network	London-based ISP
g.org		
g.vu	g.vu	URL shortener
h.plus	Unstable Reality	Homepage for the H+ research project, owned by Alessandro Perilli
i.at	MeMail	
i.email	Rocket Domains	Email service
k.at	k-digital Media GmbH & Co KG	Austrian News-portal
k.im	Kim Dotcom	URL shortcut for x.com/kimdotcom (Dotcom's X profile)
k.tt	Citynews SpA	URL shortcut for Citynews
k.vu	FreeDNS	
l.de	Leipziger Versorgungs- und Verkehrsgesellschaft	Communal holding of the city of Leipzig, encompassing energy, mobility and water infrastructure
l.ink	Top Level Design	
m.co	Volvo Cars	Volvo Cars' car sharing service, M
m.me	Meta Platforms	URL shortcut for Messenger
m.page	mmm.page	URL shortcut for mmm.page website builder
n.pr	NPR	URL shortcut for public radio network NPR
n.school	The New School	Website of The New School in Moscow
o.baby		URL shortener
o.co	Overstock.com	URL shortcut for Overstock.com
o.ke	o.ke	
p.lu		An instance of PeerTube video sharing software
q.com	QTS Data Centers	Main website
q.digital	Q.Digital, Inc.	
r.cx		URL/Bitcoin Wallet Shortener
r.nf		An instance of the Lemmy social news aggregator software, previously an instance of Libreddit, a private Reddit frontend.
s.co	Snap Inc.	URL shortcut to Snapchat's download page
s.de	Sparkasse	URL shortcut for sparkasse.de
s.id	PT Aidi Digital Global	URL shortener
s.team	Steam	Quick friend invites and URL shortcut for Steam
t.co	X Corp.	Official URL shortcut of Twitter (now X)
t.ly	t.ly	URL shortener
t.me	Telegram	URL shortcut for Telegram
u.ae	United Arab Emirates	The United Arab Emirates' Government portal
u.to	u.to	URL shortener
v.gd	v.gd	URL shortener
v.me	Visa Inc.	URL shortcut for Visa
v.org	V Foundation	
w.org	WordPress Foundation	Redirects to wordpress.org, has some assets for wordpress.org (under s.w.org)
w.wiki	Wikimedia Foundation	The official Wikimedia Foundation URL shortener
x.ai	xAI	Homepage URL
x.com	X (formerly Twitter)	
x.company	X Development	Main website
x.sv	SparkVault	Cryptography platform
x.team	X Development	Shortcut to careers page
y.gy		URL shortener and QR code service
y.org	YMCA of the United States	Shortcut to YMCA
z.ai	Z.ai	AI chatbot and coding model
z.pn		URL shortener
s.ee		URL shortener
b.ls		URL shortener
g.ls		URL shortener
j.ls		URL shortener
q.gg		URL shortener
q.ls		URL shortener
u.ls		URL shortener
w.ls		URL shortener
z.ls		URL shortener
u.nu		URL shortener
0.sb		URL shortener
0.tl		URL shortener
2.pe		URL shortener
2.sb		URL shortener
3.sb		URL shortener
4.sb		URL shortener
5.st		URL shortener
6.vu		URL shortener
7.ls		URL shortener
8.nf		URL shortener
9.ms		URL shortener
d.tl		URL shortener
e.gd		URL shortener
f.tl		URL shortener
h.fo		URL shortener
i.vg		URL shortener
j.gt		URL shortener
l.gt		URL shortener
l.nf		URL shortener
l.td		URL shortener
m.bo		URL shortener
n.ms		URL shortener
p.sb		URL shortener
q.cg		URL shortener
r.gl		URL shortener
s.sb		URL shortener
s.tt		URL shortener
u.nf		URL shortener
z.nu		URL shortener
a.ac		URL shortener
a.tt		URL shortener
b.ee		URL shortener
b.lu		URL shortener
c.sk		URL shortener
d.ac		URL shortener
f.bi		URL shortener
h.lu		URL shortener
h.sk		URL shortener
k.sk		URL shortener
l.tt		URL shortener
n.ee		URL shortener
n.lu		URL shortener
q.lu		URL shortener
t.ee		URL shortener
t.lu		URL shortener
t.sc		URL shortener
u.sc		URL shortener
u.sk		URL shortener
v.sc		URL shortener
x.sh		URL shortener
z.ee		URL shortener
z.sh		URL shortener
w.page		Initiative site and URL shortener
z.camp	Zcamp	
z.cg		URL shortener
z.lighting	Zumtobel Group	Main website

Many other single-letter second-level domains have been registered under country code top-level domains. The list of country code top-level domains which have been identified to allow single-letter domains are:

- .ac
- .af
- .ag
- .ai
- .am
- .at
- .bo
- .by
- .bz
- .cg
- .cm
- .cn
- .co
- .cr
- .cx
- .cz
- .de
- .dk
- .et
- .fm
- .fr
- .gd
- .gg
- .gl
- .gp
- .gs
- .gt
- .gy
- .hn
- .hr
- .ht
- .ie
- .im
- .io
- .is
- .je
- .kg
- .ki
- .kw
- .la
- .lb
- .lc
- .lu
- .ly
- .md
- .mg
- .mk
- .mp
- .ms
- .mw
- .mx
- .mu
- .nf
- .np
- .nz
- .pe
- .ph
- .pk
- .pl
- .pn
- .pr
- .pw
- .ro
- .sc
- .sh
- .sk
- .st
- .tc
- .tl
- .tt
- .to
- .tv
- .ua
- .uk
- .vc
- .vg
- .vn
- .vu
- .ws

=== Non-ASCII single-character domains ===
Single-character non-ASCII second-level domains also exist (as seen below), also known as Internationalized domain names (IDN), these domains are actually registered as their Punycode translations (which are more than a single character) for DNS purposes. ICANN oversees a process for determining registration rules that involves wide-ranging stakeholder input and assorted Working Groups. In the case of .com domains, decisions are then implemented by Verisign, the contracted backend operator for the .com registry. The result is a list of 96,957 codepoints allowed for IDN registrations. As mentioned above, some additional domains previously registered are "grandfathered" and remain active. Many gTLDs also allow IDN registration.

These 96,957 distinct IDN characters eligible for registration in .com are the essential building-blocks of languages worldwide. A single letter domain does not provide the context found in a longer string or group of words. They may appear similar to one another or to other English / Latin characters; due to this potential for confusion, browsers have restricted the characters that may be rendered and will display the restricted characters in their Punycode form. They are sometimes used as pictorial symbols and memorable links.

Among IDNs currency symbols are considered extremely rare given their day to day use on mobile keyboards. These domains are grandfathered and if the registration is allowed to lapse, domain will be reserved by the registry.

Currency Symbol Domains
Internationalized Domain Name (IDN)	Punycode Domain + TLD	Usage	Registration Date / Registrar (WHOIS entry)
¢.com	xn--8a.com	Crypto website	25 April 2004 / Namecheap
£.com	xn--9a.com	Currency Symbol .COMs	25 April 2004 / Namecheap
€.com	xn--lzg.com	Currency Symbol .COMs	5 September 2003 / Domain.com
¥.com	xn--cba.com	Currency Symbol .COMs	5 September 2003 / OnlineNIC, Inc.
₩.com	xn--izg.com	Currency Symbol .COMs	29 August 2004 / Dynadot.com
₦.com	xn--fzg.com	Currency Symbol .COMs	19 June 2004 / Name.com
₣.com	xn--czg.com	Currency Symbol .COMs	19 April 2001 / CSC Corporate Domains, Inc.
฿.com	XN--T4C.COM	Currency Symbol .COMs	03 September 2009 / Name.com
₮.com	xn--nzg.com	Currency Symbol .COMs	11 September 2005 / Name.com
₯.com	xn--ozg.com	Currency Symbol .COMs	11 September 2005 / Name.com
₱.com	xn--qzg.com	Currency Symbol .COMs	18 June 2004 / DomainSite, Inc.
₪.com	xn--jzg.com	Currency Symbol .COMs	19 April 2001 / CSC Corporate Domains, Inc.
₰.com	xn--pzg.com	Currency Symbol .COMs	04 October 2005 / Name.com

IDN single characters
Internationalized Domain Name (IDN)	Punycode Domain + TLD	Usage	Registration Date / Registrar (WHOIS entry)
ॐ.com	xn--q3b.com	Religious symbol / digital asset	19 April 2001 / Name.com, Inc.
ੴ.com	xn--2cc.com	Religious symbol / digital asset	26 March 2006 / Dynadot Inc.
ੴ.net	xn--2cc.net	Religious symbol	01 September 2023 / Porkbun LLC
ੴ.cc	xn--2cc.cc	Religious symbol	27 October 2023 / Dynadot Inc.
ꓸ.com	xn--8m8a.com	virtual collectible / digital asset	15 July 2017 / Dynadot LLC
℗.net	xn--n2g.net	Digital Asset	14 October 2009 / Porkbun llc
ꓮ.com	xn--ym8a.com	virtual collectible / digital asset	18 July 2017 / Dynadot LLC
𐊠.com	xn--967c.com		01 January 2020 / Name.com, Inc.
ᗅ.com	xn--upe.com	Former StrongestBrands URL shortcut	26 December 2015 / Name.com, Inc.
Ꭺ.com	xn--g9d.com		18 February 2015 / Name.com, Inc.
Ậ.com	xn--zkg.com	2-5.org	18 April 2021 / Google LLC
𐊡.com	xn--b77c.com	26 Shirts' official URL shortcut	06 July 2019 / Name.com, Inc.
𐊂.com	xn--f67c.com		
ꓚ.com	xn--em8a.com	virtual collectible / digital asset	18 July 2017 / Dynadot LLC
𐊢.com	xn--c77c.com		
ꓓ.com	xn--6l8a.com	virtual collectible / digital asset	18 July 2017 / Dynadot LLC
ꓰ.com	xn--0m8a.com	virtual collectible / digital asset	18 July 2017 / Dynadot LLC
𐊤.com	xn--e77c.com	erikw.com	30. April 2018 / NameCheap, Inc.
𐊥.com	xn--f77c.com	Nick Davenport IQinternet.net & DBSTrust.com, UK	29 April 2020 / GoDaddy.com, LLC
ꓖ.com	xn--9l8a.com	virtual collectible / digital asset	18 July 2017 / Dynadot LLC
ꮐ.com	xn--29d.com		
ꓧ.com	xn--rm8a.com	virtual collectible / digital asset	08 July 2018 / Dynadot LLC
ꓲ.com	xn--2m8a.com	virtual collectible / digital asset	18 July 2017 / Dynadot LLC
𐊦.com	xn--g77c.com		29 April 2018 / GoDaddy.com, LLC
Ī.com	xn--5ea.com	2-5.org	09 April 2021 / Google LLC
ḷ.com	xn--mhg.com		26 July 2017 / Internet Domain Service BS Corp
ㆲ.com	xn--3jk.com		3 December 2022 / GoDaddy, LLC
ꓙ.com	xn--dm8a.com	virtual collectible / digital asset	18 July 2017 / Dynadot LLC
ꓗ.com	xn--bm8a.com	virtual collectible / digital asset	18 July 2017 / Dynadot LLC
ꓡ.com	xn--lm8a.com	virtual collectible / digital asset	18 July 2017 / Dynadot LLC
ꓟ.com	xn--jm8a.com	virtual collectible / digital asset	18 July 2017 / Dynadot LLC
𐊰.com	xn--q77c.com	Mahdi Taghizadeh's official URL shortcut	16 April 2018 / NameCheap, Inc.
ƞ.com	xn--gia.com	virtual collectible / digital asset	28 December 2020 / Dynadot LLC
ꓠ.com	xn--km8a.com	virtual collectible / digital asset	18 July 2017 / Dynadot LLC
𐊪.com	xn--k77c.com		10 May 2018 / GoDaddy.com, LLC
ꚡ.com	xn--ez8a.com	NES Natural Endocrinology Specialists	10 February 2021 / Google LLC
ӧ.com	xn--h6a.com	ӧ's homepage.	09 November 2014 / Name.com, Inc.
ꓳ.com	xn--3m8a.com	virtual collectible / digital asset	18 July 2017 / Dynadot LLC
〇.com	xn--w6j.com	Started by Cancer, Memorial	28 February 2006 / DomainSite, Inc.
𐊫.com	xn--l77c.com	Simon Young Institution.co.uk official shortcut	28 April 2020 / CSL Computer Service Langenbach GmbH d/b/a joker.com
০.com	xn--07b.com	virtual collectible / digital asset	15 May 2026 / InterNetX GmbH
ᩅ.com	xn--rnf.com		11 August 2018 / Dynadot LLC
ዐ.net	xn--72d.net	NOC of the Internet	14 January 2021 / Google LLC
ᴩ.com	xn--w8f.com		25 December 2011 / Name.com, Inc.
ꓣ.com	xn--nm8a.com	virtual collectible / digital asset	18 July 2017 / Dynadot LLC
𐊯.com	xn--p77c.com		27 April 2021 / Google LLC
ꓢ.com	xn--mm8a.com	virtual collectible / digital asset	18 July 2017 / Dynadot LLC
ꜱ.com	xn--i38a.com		15 November 2013 / Name.com, Inc.
ꕷ.com	xn--vq8a.com	Landlord Insurance Startup Steadily URL shortcut	04 June 2021 / Google LLC
ꓔ.com	xn--7l8a.com	virtual collectible / digital asset	18 July 2017 / Dynadot LLC
ፐ.com	xn--v6d.com	Crypto Chain University's official URL shortcut	10 December 2014 / Tucows Domains Inc.
ţ.com	xn--rga.com	don Pablo donPabloNow.com official shortcut	18 February 2021 / NameCheap, Inc.
ꓴ.com	xn--4m8a.com	virtual collectible / digital asset	18 July 2017 / Dynadot LLC
𐋊.com	xn--h87c.com		10 May 2018 / GoDaddy.com, LLC
ꓦ.com	xn--qm8a.com	virtual collectible / digital asset	18 July 2017 / Dynadot LLC
ꛟ.com	xn--508a.com	Veritas Home Buyers official URL shortcut	10 February 2021 / Google LLC
ꓪ.com	xn--um8a.com	virtual collectible / digital asset	18 July 2017 / Dynadot LLC
ꓫ.com	xn--vm8a.com	virtual collectible / digital asset	18 July 2017 / Dynadot LLC
☓.com	xn--33h.com	Herbert R. Sim's official URL shortcut	03 February 2005 / Tucows Domains Inc.
ꓬ.com	xn--wm8a.com	virtual collectible / digital asset	18 July 2017 / Dynadot LLC
𐊲.com	xn--s77c.com	AnaptysBio's official URL shortcut	02 March 2018 / Name.com, Inc.
ꓜ.com	xn--gm8a.com	virtual collectible / digital asset	18 July 2017 / Dynadot LLC
ꛉ.com	xn--j08a.com	The Trusted Home Buyer official URL shortcut	05 May 2021 / Google LLC
𐋇.com	xn--e87c.com		21 January 2018 / Google LLC
𓂺.com	xn--hu7d.com	virtual collectible / digital asset	11 January 2019 / Dynadot LLC
ㆺ.com	xn--ckk.com	iSellSquares.com Homepage	27 February 2020 / GoDaddy.com, LLC
☺.com	xn--74h.com	Daniel Früh's official URL shortcut	03 June 2004 / DomainSite, Inc.
ツ.com	xn--bdk.com		29 June 2019 / NameSilo, LLC
ッ.top	xn--9ck.top	virtual collectible / digital asset	27 January 2016 / Dynadot LLC
シ.top	xn--xck.top	virtual collectible / digital asset	28 February 2022 / Dynadot LLC
シ.dev	xn--xck.dev	virtual collectible / digital asset	7 July 2023 / GoDaddy.com, LLC
ꙮ.com	xn--xx8a.com		17 October 2018 / GoDaddy.com, LLC
ʘ.com	xn--lpa.com		17 July 2015 / Name.com, Inc.
ʢ.com	xn--vpa.com	don Pablo donPabloNow.com official shortcut	27 February 2022 / NameCheap, Inc.
ư.com	xn--yia.com		19 August 2018 / GoDaddy.com, LLC
৬.com	xn--67b.com	Shortcut to AIEDGE	17 September 2021 / Sav.com, LLC
ௐ.com	xn--0mc.com		15 August 2020 / NameCheap, Inc.
தீ.com	xn--rlc0d.com		17 January 2019 / Google LLC
தீ.இந்தியா	xn--rlc0d.xn--xkc2dl3a5ee0h		06 April 2021 / Dynadot LLC

== Project94 ==
In 2012, the Public Interest Registry (PIR) initiated Project94, in which 94 one- and two-letter domains in the top-level domain org, that had been traditionally reserved, are awarded to qualifying organizations.

== Market value of single- or two-letter domains ==
Only three of the 26 possible single-letter domains have ever been registered under the .com domain, all before 1992. The other 23 single-letter .com domain names were registered January 1, 1992 by Jon Postel, with the intention to avoid a single company commercially controlling a letter of the alphabet. Many but not all .com two-letter domain names are among the most valuable domain names.

While it is widely believed that the domain names business.com and sex.com have been the most valuable domain name transactions, prominent two-letter domain names have only been sold after nondisclosed transactions handled by specialized broker and law firms.

The value of the LG Corp (the South Korean electronics conglomerate formerly known as Lucky-Goldstar) purchase of LG.com was never published. LG Group missed the first sale of the domain name in 2008 from the original owner the chemical company Lockwood Greene to the dot-com entrepreneur Andy Booth; Booth had used it to launch a footballing website known as LifeGames. LG Corp bought "lg.com" one year later, in 2009. Following the purchase, LG Group changed worldwide marketing to LG.com, which is now their central internet address for all countries. All national LG country domain names like "LG.de" or "LG.com.mx" redirect to "LG.com".

The value of the initially secret November 2010 Facebook purchase of FB.com was revealed two months later to be $8.5 million in cash and the rest in stocks.

IG Group paid $4.7 million in September 2013 to buy IG.com.

GMO Internet, Inc. purchased Z.com for nearly $6.8 million from Nissan, who previously used it for the Nissan Z series cars.

== Controversy ==
With the 2005 announcement that registration of the remaining single-letter names might become available, some companies have attempted to establish a right to the names by claiming trademark rights over single letters used in such a context. U magazine, a college-oriented publication, went so far as to rebrand its website as "U.com" and apply for a trademark registration of the same phrase, before sending a letter to ICANN attempting to gain priority for the domain if it should ever become available in the future.
