= 2000 Arizona Democratic presidential primary =

- March 11, 2000

29 delegates to the Democratic National Convention (24 pledged, 5 unpledged) The number of pledged delegates received is determined by the popular vote

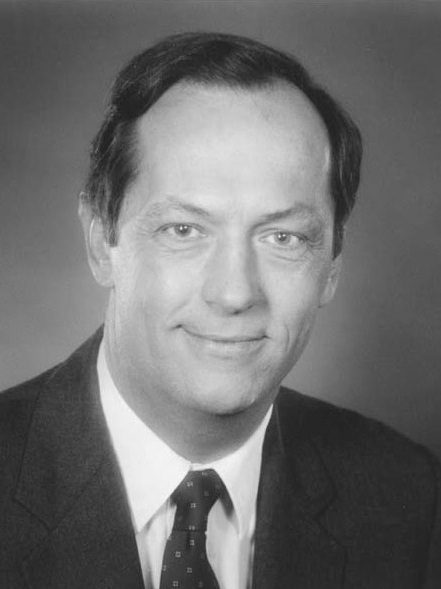
Candidate	Al Gore	Bill Bradley (withdrawn)
Home state	Tennessee	New Jersey
Delegate count	40	7
Popular vote	67,582	16,383
Percentage	77.89%	18.88%

In March 2000 the Arizona Democratic Party ran its Presidential Primary over the internet using the private company Election.com. The announcement received significant press coverage around the world, covered in virtually every country and medium as a test of whether internet voting could actually work in a statewide election.

== Voting Rights Act lawsuits ==
Several attempts were made to stop the election, including a lawsuit instigated by the Virginia-based Voting Integrity Project, which claimed that Internet voting would disadvantage African Americans, Latinos, and Native Americans, all protected classes under the Voting Rights Act. The Voting Integrity Project, along with two African American and two Hispanic plaintiffs, claimed that by allowing Internet voting, minority groups, which at that time had less access to the internet, would have their collective voting power proportionately reduced. The plaintiff's sought an injunction to stop the election. The lawsuit, along with other factors, was depleting the resources of the Arizona Democratic Party. The court had to determine if the voting rights act applied, since this election was being conducted by the Democratic Party itself, not the state or country government; the plaintiff's argued it was. The court also had to decide if the election was unfairly diluting the minority vote, given the plaintiffs' claims that whites were more likely to vote over the internet than non-whites. Several organizations filed amicus briefs in support of the Democratic Party and the Internet election, including the Benjamin E. Mayes National Education Resource Center, the Center of Government Studies, and Professor Charles Nesson of Harvard Law School. On March 2, 2000, Judge Paul G. Rosenblatt, of the United States District Court in Phoenix, issued its decision. While the court agreed with the plaintiffs that this was a public election, it also noted in its decision that there were other ways to vote, including absentee ballot by mail, and voting at polling places, and thus there was no basis to stop the election. The court denied the request for an injunction to stop the election.

== Civil rights concerns ==
Serious concerns about internet were also raised by civil rights organizations around the United States. Native American support is particularly important in Arizona, where they numbered more than 250,000. The states two most prominent leaders were Apache leader John Lewis, president of the Inter-Tribal Counsel, and Kelsey A. Begaye President of the Navajo Nation. The outreach efforts by Election.com CEO, Joe Mohen, and the Arizona Democratic Party to Native Americans were particularly successful, such that the Voting Integrity Project was unable to recruit even one Native American to be a plaintiff in their case, and The Navajo leadership, including President Kelsey Begaye, prominent Native American leaders posed for Television Cameras when they later voted over the internet.

On February 24, 2000, the Department of Justice granted pre-clearance for the election.

== Security threats ==
Many public threats by hackers were made that they would bring down the election. These threats ranged from to denial of service attacks and voter identity theft. The election software was audited by KPMG. While the original plan was to use VeriSign digital certificates, though ultimately PINs were mailed to each voter and a challenge–response authentication system (such as birth date, place of birth, or social security number) was used as well. One magazine columnist, Howard Mortman, even hired a computer hacker to attempt to disrupt the election.

== Voting period ==
The week of the election, online voting was allowed beginning Tuesday March 7 through Friday March 10. The following Saturday March 11, voting would be allowed at Polling Places only, through personal computers. There were some minor problems, in that a few polling places did not open on schedule, and some users with older browsers could not vote. The election went off successfully, with voter turnout increasing from 36,326 in the 1996 Primary to 86,762 in the 2000 internet primary. Contrary to expectations, Native American turnout also increased more than 500% and African American and Latino turnout both went up more than 800%, defying those who claimed that minorities would not use the internet to cast votes. The results were certified by the State Board of Elections. There were many other "firsts"; news footage showing a middle-aged quadriplegic man in Arizona who cast his first unassisted, secret ballot using the Internet. election.com reported no hacking during the election. Shortly after, Mohen was featured on the cover of the Industry Standard Magazine.

== Results ==
2000 Arizona Democratic presidential primary
Candidate	Vote		Pledged delegates
Candidate	#	%	Pledged delegates
Al Gore	67,582	77.89%	40
Bill Bradley (withdrawn)	16,383	18.88%	7
Uncommitted	1,439	1.66%	0
Heather A. Harder	1,358	1.57%	0
Total valid votes	86,762	100%	47

== Ongoing debate ==
The Arizona Democratic primary has been called the "first legally binding public election to offer internet voting". However, the Arizona Democratic Party and the private company administering the election argued in federal court that it was a private election outside of federal jurisdiction. Still others, such as the Internet Policy Institute, have classified the primary, as a "hybrid between public and private elections... not run by state election officials, but were still subject to some aspects of state and federal election law." And there were some glitches such as that certain Macintosh browsers did not work. Nonetheless, the 2000 Arizona Internet vote was hailed worldwide as a landmark case of using the Internet at a major election.
