= X.com =

x.com may refer to:

- A single-letter second-level domain on the internet, currently owned by X Corp.
  - X (social network), a social media platform formerly known as Twitter that currently uses the x.com domain
- X.com (bank), a defunct online bank

== See also ==
- XCOM (disambiguation)
- x.co, URL shortening
- x.org (disambiguation)
- X (disambiguation) § Companies
- X Corp., the parent company of the social network
- /x/, 4chan board
- EXCOMM
