= Joe Mohen =

American businessman (born 1956)

Joseph T. Mohen
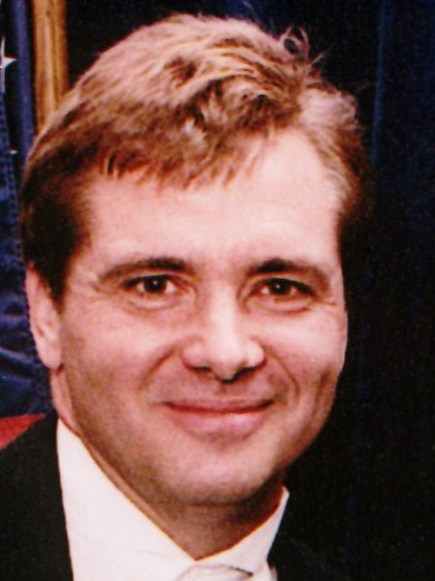
- Mohen in Summer of 2000
- Born: July 19, 1956 (age 70); Queens, New York
- Occupation: Internet media
- Known for: Running the 2000 Arizona Democratic presidential primary online

Joseph T. Mohen (born July 19, 1956) works in physical AI including in automation and 3D media. He has been CEO of Nylon Media, best known for having been founder and CEO and co-founder of Election.com, which ran the Arizona Democratic Primary in March 2000, the world's first legally binding election conducted on the Internet, according to the company. Mohen was also a force in creating the era of free legal music, as the founder of SpiralFrog, an proto-music streaming service, which even before Spotify was able secure the rights to free music distribution from the major record labels in return for a share of the advertising revenues; SpiralFrog ultimately failed because it did not create an iPhone APP, but the licensees that he negotiated paved the way for the streaming music era.

In March 2016, Mohen published a guest blog predicting the collapse of baseball World Series television revenues unless its schedule is revamped.

== Early life and childhood ==
Mohen was born in the New York City borough of Queens, the oldest of twelve children of Joseph Conrad Mohen (1935–2017) and Virginia Ann (Kelly) Mohen (born 1935), both descendants of Irish immigrants. His maternal great-grandfather, James Morris, an immigrant from Liverpool, was one of the first full time staff of any motion picture studio, being hired by Adolph Zukor in 1912, at Famous Players, making sets for the silent films at Chelsea Studios in Manhattan; Famous Players was later merged with a competitor and renamed Paramount Pictures. In 1960, when Mohen was four, the family moved to Garden City on Long Island. There he attended a local Catholic School, St. Anne's, and later an Episcopal Preparatory School, St. Paul's; while in high school he attended Boys State, and was captain of the Cross Country and Track teams. He was offered a track scholarship to the University of Akron, which he declined, instead electing to attend Johns Hopkins University in Baltimore where he studied Mathematics and Biochemistry, and Manhattan College in New York City studying Business.

== Early career ==
Mohen started his career working for Chase Bank on Wall Street, and became an officer at Citibank at 24 years old. Having worked as a software engineer for six years, Mohen became a Certified Computer Professional in Systems Development in 1985. The following year he founded Proginet Corporation, which he served as CEO of until September 1996, and remained a Chairman through 1998. In 1987, Proginet created a complex software package called XCOM, which sold in 1992 to a predecessor company of Computer Associates, and was one of the software products to span more than eleven computer operating systems. The renamed CA-XCOM was sold by Computer Associates through 2017. As CEO, Mohen secured equity stakes from both Novell and Microsoft in Proginet; Proginet was later acquired by Tibco Software. Mohen also was a contributing editor and columnist for eWeek, Data Communications Magazine, and Network World; in 1989, he wrote a widely quoted article, called "Seeking a Cure for the Vaporware Epidemic", writing "my own estimate is that at the time of announcement, 10% of software products don't actually exist ... Vendors that are unwilling to [prove it exists] shouldn't announce their packages to the press", blaming the press for not investigating claims by developers, saying "If the pharmaceutical industry were this careless, I could announce a cure for cancer today – to a believing press."

In 1990-1992, Mohen was a committee member for setting standards for Open Systems Interconnections Protocols, with representatives from computer and telecommunications organizations from around the world.

== Election.com ==
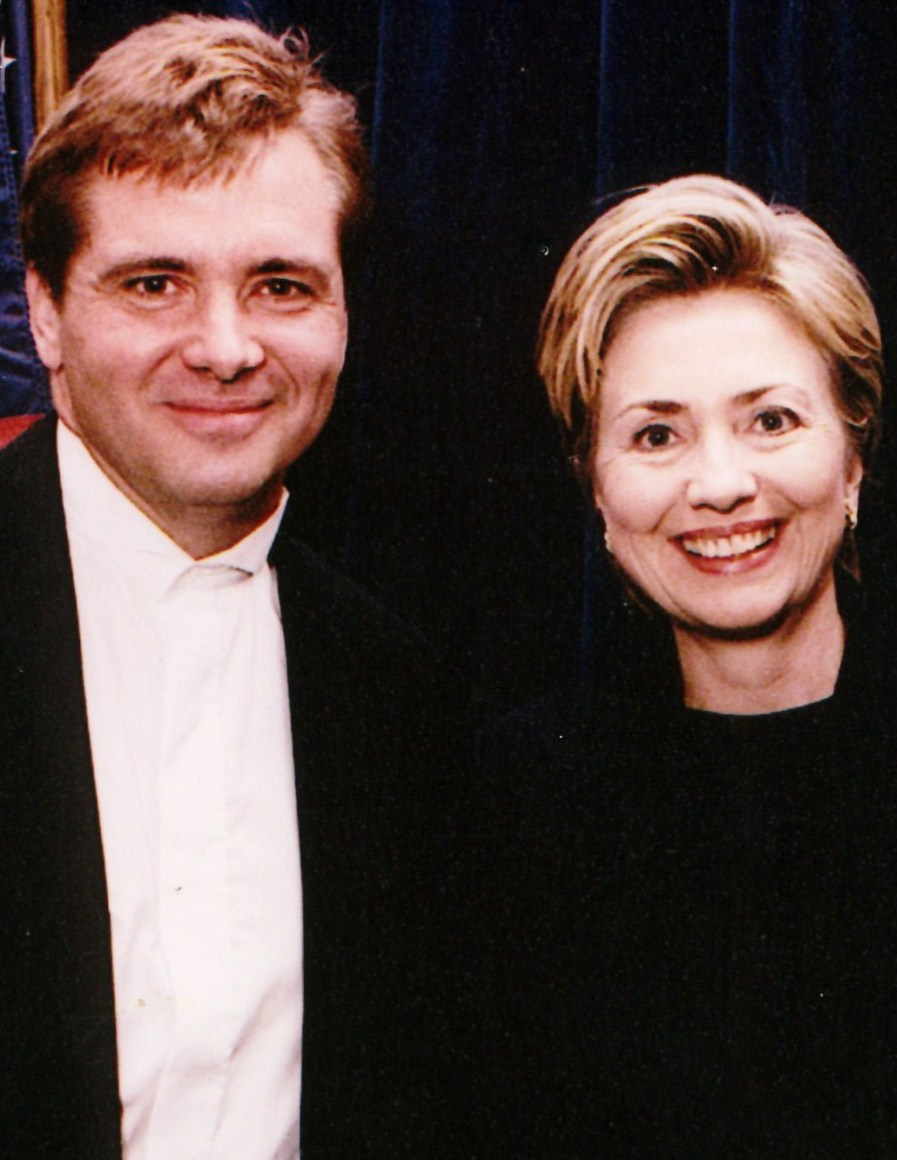
Joe Mohen and Hillary Clinton in 2000

Mohen co-founded Election.com, with which in 1999 he was able to recruit Jack Kemp and former Irish Taoiseach (i.e. Prime Minister) Garret FitzGerald to the board. Election.com [sic] is best known for administering the 2000 Arizona Democratic presidential primary Internet election. The company, originally called Votation.com, was started in part with equity investments from VeriSign and Accenture. In February, Election.com acquired NewVoter.com with then internet entrepreneur and civil rights advocate Mark Strama (who was subsequently elected to the Texas State legislature in 2004), who joined Election.com as Vice President.

During the second week of March 2000, Election.com administered the Arizona Democratic presidential primary, which was the first time in American history that a statewide election offered citizens the choice to cast their ballots over the web. The candidates were Vice President Al Gore, Senator Bill Bradley, and Dr. Heather Harder. Voter turnout was up more 500% versus the previous primary, and more than double the previous record turnout.

Six months later, the Internet Corporation for Assigning Names and Numbers (ICANN), the technical coordination body for the internet, chose Election.com to run their worldwide vote for its board of directors. Voters came from every continent.

Mohen expanded the company to New York, Washington, Texas, London, Paris, Sydney, Australia, and Christchurch, New Zealand, and saw Election.com named to the Red Herring 100, as well as its top 50 Private Companies list.

Mohen stepped down as CEO of Election.com in 2001. Two years after Mohen left, the public sector elections business of Election.com was acquired by Accenture.

== Automating Catholic Church finance ==
In late 2001, Mohen founded ParishPay, a Fintech company which automated handling of money for churches around the United States. The company replaced the envelope system, whereby donations were placed into envelopes each Sabbath, with a system in which parish members could have their donations automatically debited from their bank or credit card accounts each month. Shortly after its launch, the system was featured in a front page story in the New York Times, after signing the Catholic Dioceses of Chicago, San Jose, and Orlando, and ParishPay received Venture Capital financing in late 2002. Mohen sold his interest In ParishPay to start SpiralFrog, although ParishPay grew substantially and was later merged with SmartTuition; ParishPay was sold to Yapstone in April 2012. In 2017, ParishPay was sold to Liturgical Publications for $80 million, and was rebranded as WeShare.

== Digital music and SpiralFrog ==
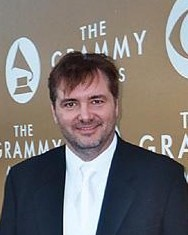
Joe Mohen at the 2004 Grammys

Mohen started SpiralFrog, Inc. in an effort to create a market-driven solution to digital music piracy, the forerunner of music streaming services. In 2004, a focus group in New York City was held to determine how to solve the problem of young people stealing music. One of the attendees in the focus group responded "Why don't you just give away the music"….and show advertising during the downloads. Most doubted the four major record labels would ever go along with the idea, especially the largest music company – Universal Music Group, Mohen set out to recruit directors from music and advertising to obtain the needed licenses. Among those recruited included former CEOs Jay Bernman (IFPI), Frances Preston (BMI), and Robin Kent (Interpublic Universal McCann). Finally, on August 28, 2006, the Financial Times reported in its lead story, that it had granted SpiralFrog the first ever license to give away its complete catalog of music to consumers for free, in return for a share of the advertising revenues.

"This is really promising that the labels are going to finally stop kvetching and start thinking intelligently about where their money's going to come from in the 21st century," said Aram Sinnreich, of Radar Research, being quoted in the Los Angeles Times. "SpiralFrog is one small step for the record labels, one great leap for music kind."

While SpiralFrog service was one of the earliest free internet music services to be supported by advertising instead of charging users, predating Spotify and YouTube music by several years, it used a proto-streaming model, but was not compatible with Apple or Android devices.

The launch of SpiralFrog was delayed, due to technical and licensing delays, and an internal control fight. Robin Kent, the British advertising executive who had been recruited by Mohen the year before, attempted a spectacular corporate takeover in December 2006, which was widely reported in the press. Mohen emerged the winner in what was later known as the "Boxing Day Massacre", but most industry observers believed that SpiralFrog.com would never launch. Mohen continued to insist that he would overcome these obstacles and launch the site. He went on to sign all remaining major music publishers, and performing rights societies, financed the company with exchangeable debt, and SpiralFrog.com finally launched on September 17, 2007. In June 2008, Mohen concluded an agreement with the British music company EMI, whose catalog was added to SpiralFrog prior to the Coldplay Viva La Vida tour.

However, the collapse of the stock market in September 2008, and the ensuing credit crisis, combined with contraction of the advertising markets, left SpiralFrog unable to meet its collateralized note agreements. SpiralFrog was particularly vulnerable to the credit crisis because it was debt-financed as opposed to equity-financed, and its backers were hedge funds who were themselves facing huge redemptions. Its loans were called and SpiralFrog was forced to close. Retrospectively, while other free ad-supported music services that came later did succeed like Spotify, the SpiralFrog download (rather than streaming) model limited the number of devices on which SpiralFrog could be used, and ultimately prevent its long term success.

== Nylon Magazine and Holographic Media ==
In May 2014, Mohen was part of a group, also including Dana Fields, that purchased Nylon Magazine, a fashion magazine for young women that focused on gritty street fashion, which was merged with digital media company FashionIndie. Following the merger, he became interim CEO of the combined company, and served as an adviser afterwards. The Nylon Media transaction was significant because it laid the foundation for the transformation of a traditional media print business into one that was primarily digital, facilitated in part by the young demographic of its audience, part by the merger with the fashion blogger company, and because of the focus of the new management team.

Mohen led a metaverse systems management software development team to create a technology platform to stream holograms that do not require glasses to see. It was the world's first platform dedicated to managing holographic tourist attractions, fashion shows, retail locations, and television; it also acquired music meta databases and began repurposing them to manage holographic music media assets. The company also pioneered blockchain media research for this sector. In 2019 he spoke at the Light Field and Holographic Display Summit.

== AI Software ==
In 2026 Mohen became Chairman of Neocortex Robotics, Inc., a Physical AI software company in warehouse and Tanker automation.

== Awards and miscellaneous ==
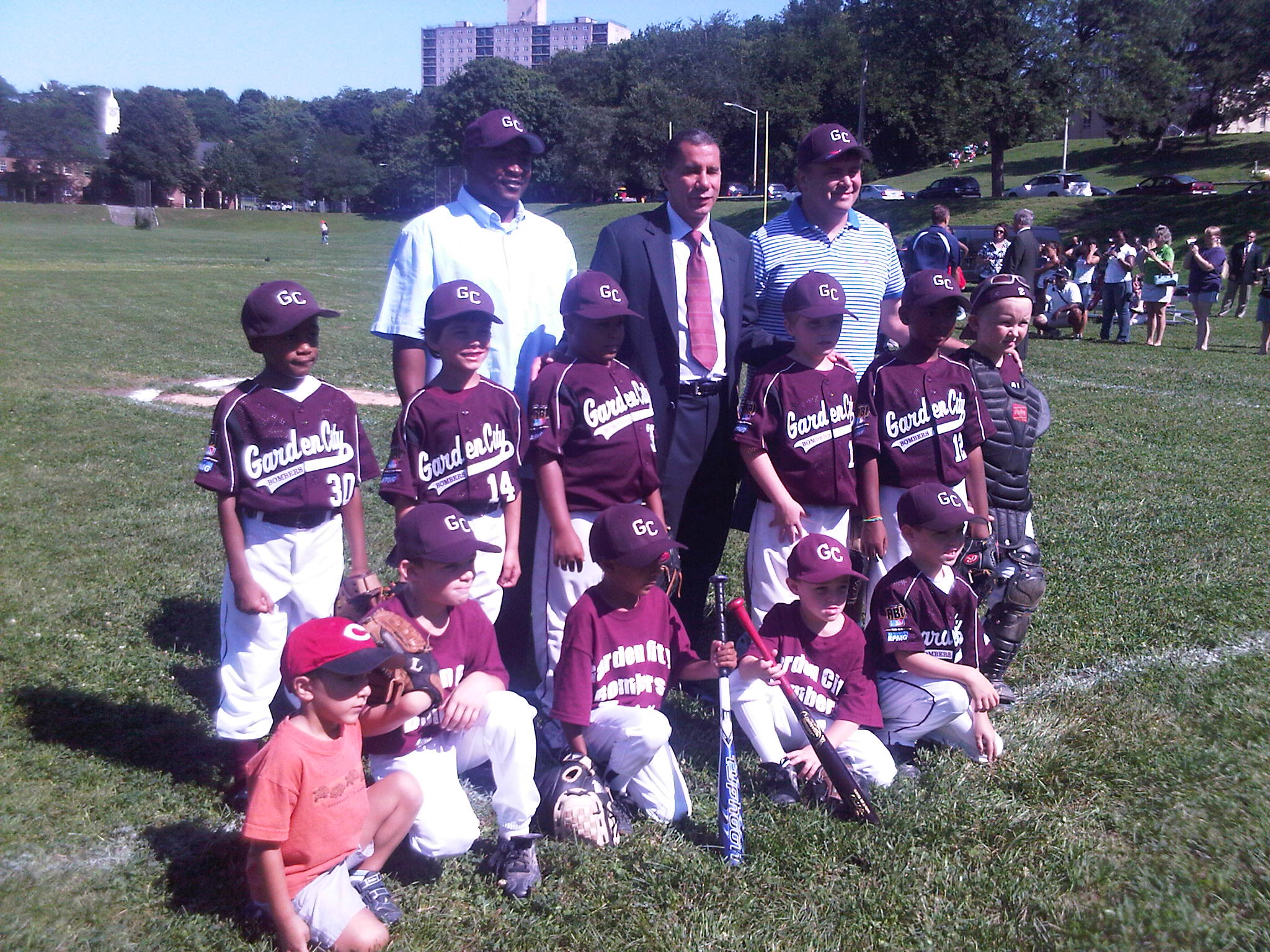
Mohen, top row, far right, next to New York Governor David Paterson July 2010, and son Matthew, in catchers gear

Mohen gave the keynote address at the Interop Conference in Washington in 1993, and an address to the South African Technology leadership in Pretoria in 1990 on transition after Apartheid. He won the Long Island Software Awards in 1997, 2000, and 2008. He is a former member of the National Association of Corporate Directors Blue Ribbon Commission on Corporate Governance, and of Legatus, the organization of Catholic Chief Executive Officers. Mohen was also selected to speak onstage with Microsoft CEO Steve Ballmer when Microsoft announced that it had broken the previous record for the TPS benchmark for scalable systems in September 2000. He served on the Interactive Advertising Bureau's Broadband Committee in 2006. In June 2011, the Montreal based technology accelerator program, FounderFuel, selected Mohen among its Entrepreneur Mentors, along with David Cancel, David Hauser, and Jean-Sebastien Cournoyer, among others.

In 2013, Mohen published two controversial and provocative Op Ed pieces on digital media in Computerworld and Ad Age. The former chastises text book publishers for failing to make all the text books available in electronic form, while the latter states that vendor claims about a new advertising technology were over-hyped.

Mohen has been active in the charity organized by Major League Baseball for keeping minority and underprivileged youth active in sports. He ran the Long Island, New York, chapter of Reviving Baseball in Inner Cities (RBI), through Garden City Bombers Baseball non-profit organization, of which he was one of the founders; this organizations combines young people from minority and affluent neighborhoods on the same baseball teams, and combines the teaching of baseball skills, with academic support, and other life lessons. In 2006 and 2007, he organized a number of baseball tournaments in the Dominican Republic, and in July 2010 he helped organize the first Governor's tee ball game at the Executive Mansion in Albany, New York.
