= Proginet =

American software company

Proginet Corporation
- Type: Subsidiary
- Industry: Enterprise Software
- Founded: 1986 New York City (as Teleprocessing Connection Inc.)
- Founder: Joe Mohen (with the company 1986-1998)
- Headquarters: Garden City, New York
- Products: CyberFusion Integration Suite; Slingshot; Slingshot Appliance; AnyFileNow; RocketStream; Edge Server; Harbor File Transfer; Network Storage Manager
- Revenue: US $8.5M(2006)
- Website: www.proginet.com

Proginet Corporation, which was acquired by Tibco Software in 2010, was a systems management software company best known for developing a file transfer product known as XCOM.

== History ==
Proginet was founded 1986 by Joseph T. Mohen and is headquartered in Garden City, New York. It has offices in Toronto, Ontario, Canada.

In the late 1980s, it developed a product called XCOM which was intended to allow companies to manage the process of moving bulk data between 26 different computer operating systems.

Thomas Charles Bauer joined the company at its founding and was the chief developer of the XCOM file transfer software. He also served as the company's Software Development Manager and Chief Technology Officer.

In the early 1990s, the company's rights in XCOM were sold to its distributor, which was itself later acquired by CA-Inc. XCOM went on to generate hundreds of millions of dollars in sales for CA-Inc.

After the sale of its only product, the company secured equity stakes from Microsoft and Novell, and began the development of enterprise managed file transfer products across many major computing platforms including Windows, UNIX, Linux, IBM i and the mainframe.

On June 22, 2010 the company announced that it was to be acquired by TIBCO Corporation for $23 million.
