= MailTime =

Mobile messenger application

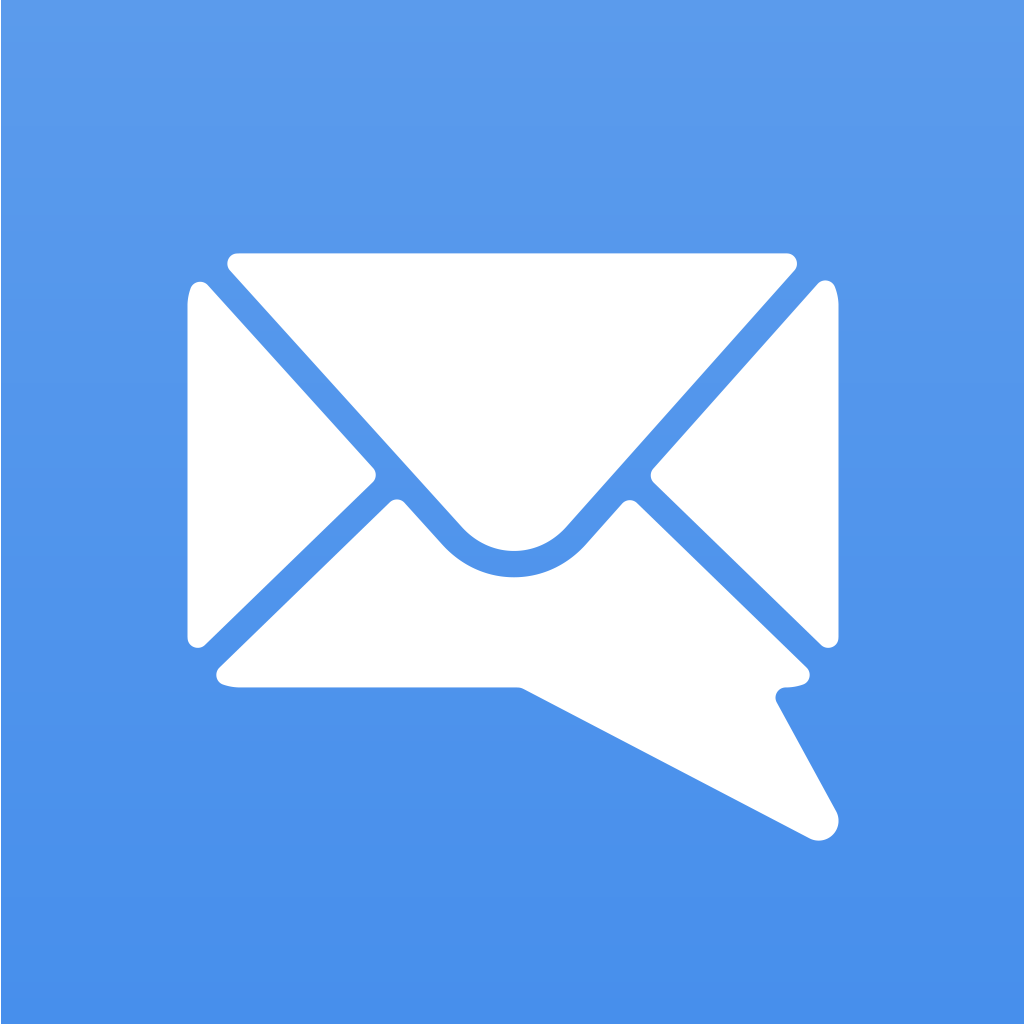
- Initial release: September 9, 2014; 11 years ago
- Stable release: 2.2.3 / (December 22, 2015; 9 years ago)
- Operating system: iOS
- Platform: iPhone, iPod Touch, iPad
- Type: Email client
- License: Freemium
- Website: www.mailtime.com

MailTime is a mobile messenger application for iOS and Android devices, developed by MailTime Technology Inc. in 2013. The application is known as "email messenger" which integrates the feature of email and text messages. MailTime operates on a freemium model.

== History ==
MailTime was developed by Heatherm Huang (C.E.O.) and Gary Lau (C.T.O) along with their team based in San Francisco. It was first launched in September 2014 at the TechCrunch Disrupt Startup Battlefield in San Francisco. MailTime was added to the iOS App Store on September 9, 2014, supporting single Gmail accounts and English only. It added support for 12 languages, multiple accounts, and 9 email providers in May 2015. Its international version now supports 19 languages.

The MailTime app featured as the Best New Apps by the App Store over 300 times in different countries in 2015. In December 2015, MailTime was awarded the Best of 2015 by Apple’s App Store.

The company has raised US $3.1 million in 4 rounds from 10 Investors.

== Operations and Services ==
MailTime is a messenger application built on top of the email protocol. Its content parsing engine removes signatures, repeated metadata from the traditional email formats, and displays emails in a conversation view, resembling instant messengers’ bubble chat view. By doing so, it hopes to make those messages more manageable, easier to read, and quicker to respond to. The content engine also summarizes long emails in a way that places messages into a conversation view. Emails that include multiple participants are displayed like a group chat, enabling users to reply-all or easily add and remove people from the conversation.

Its compatibility with the email protocol makes it an open messenger without forcing users’ contacts to download the same application to message.

The MailTime application supports a number of email services including Gmail, Hotmail, Yahoo! Mail, Outlook.com, iCloud, Google Apps, Office 365, AOL, Mail.Ru, Netease 163, and Tencent QQ Mail.
