= XCOM Data Transport =

File transfer software

XCOM is a proprietary file transfer utility previously owned by CA Technologies but since acquired by Broadcom Inc. on 5 November 2018.

== History ==
Spectrum Concepts Inc. of New York City, which was primarily a software consulting firm, originally developed XCOM 6.2 in the mid-1980s, in conjunction with Proginet, and sold it as a product on many platforms.

First launched in 1987, it became one of the first heterogeneous systems management software products to be widely deployed in large corporate networks around the world, at peak expanding to more than 13 operating systems, and was still being sold and deployed more than 25 years later.

Its installed based grew very rapidly at first because it was one of the first third-party products to be based upon the then advanced networking technology from IBM, known as IBM Advanced Program-to-Program Communication, which allowed faster and more reliable communication between different types of computers.

Its early versions supported IBM mainframe and midrange including IBM System 38 and AS/400, Windows, Apple, UNIX, Digital Equipment Corporation VAX, Data General, Stratus, Tandem, and others, for many decades and functions on both SNA and TCP/IP networks. XCOM establishes a peer-to-peer connection to manage all aspects of moving bulk data between heterogeneous systems.

The product was sold to Legent Corporation in 1992, in the largest software transaction in history, up until that time, in a transaction that required approval of the United States Department of Justice. In 1995, Legent Inc. was bought by Computer Associates. In 2018, Computer Associates was bought by Broadcom Inc.
