= Steinbier =

Type of beer

Steinbier (pronounced [ˈʃtaɪnˌbiːɐ], German for stone beer) is a type of beer that was predominant in Carinthia until the beginning of the 20th century. It was also common in Scandinavia, the Baltics, Franconia and south-western Germany.

Steinbier is not mashed in kettles, but in wooden tubs. Its name is derived from the hot stones that were put into the mashing tubs to achieve the required temperature for production. Due to the contact of the glowing, hot stones—often heated directly in the fire—with the malt, the resulting beer has a taste of caramel and soot. This was a traditional brewing process; top-fermenting yeasts and a taste of fruity ester were usual and there was no emphasis on long term storability. Steinbier was usually not filtered.
