= France =

Country primarily in Western Europe

French Republic République française (French)
- Flag
- Motto: Liberté, égalité, fraternité ("Liberty, equality, fraternity")
- Anthem: "La Marseillaise"
- Seal

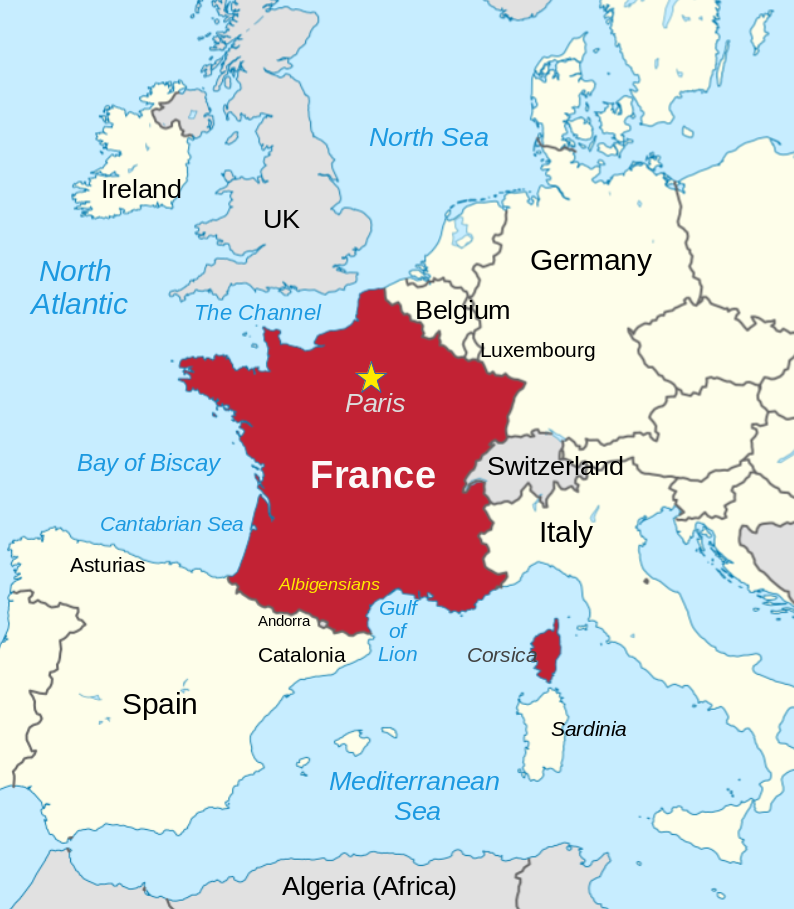
- Capital and largest city: Paris; 48°51′N 2°21′E
- Official languages: French
- Common languages: French and other regional languages (Note: French is the most widely spoken and sole official language in France. Although the Constitution of France does not officially recognise regional languages, it characterises them as "part of France's heritage". The European Charter for Regional or Minority Languages was signed by France in 1999, but has not yet been ratified. The Charter would apply to the following seven regional languages of France: Basque, Breton, Catalan, Corsican, Dutch (Western Flemish and Standard Dutch), German (dialects of German, Standard German and regional language of Alsace-Moselle) and Occitan. In addition to France's regional languages, there are also various immigrant languages spoken.)
- Religion (2025) (Note: People aged 15 years old or more living in Metropolitan France)(excluding overseas territories): 48% Christianity; 43% Catholicism; 4% Protestantism; 1% Orthodoxy; 37.5% no religion; 7% Islam; 1% Judaism; 1% Buddhism; 2.5% other religion; 3% unanswered
- Demonym: French
- Government: Unitary semi-presidential republic
  - President: Emmanuel Macron
  - Prime Minister: Sébastien Lecornu
  - President of the Senate: Gérard Larcher
  - President of the National Assembly: Yaël Braun-Pivet
- Legislature: Parliament
  - Upper house: Senate
  - Lower house: National Assembly

Establishment
  - Kingdom of the West Franks—Treaty of Verdun: 10 August 843
  - French Republic—French First Republic: 22 September 1792
  - Current constitution—French Fifth Republic: 4 October 1958

Area
  - Total: 632,702.3 km^{2} (244,287.7 sq mi) (including metropolitan France and overseas France and excluding Adélie Land) (42nd)
  - Water (%): 0.86
  - Metropolitan France (DGCL): 543,941 km^{2} (210,017 sq mi) (50th)
  - Metropolitan France (INSEE) (Note: Source gives area of metropolitan France as 551,500 km^{2} (212,900 sq mi) and lists overseas regions separately, whose areas sum to 89,179 km^{2} (34,432 sq mi). Adding these gives the total shown here for the entire French Republic. The World Factbook reports the total as 643,801 km^{2} (248,573 sq mi).): 543,908.3 km^{2} (210,004.2 sq mi) (Note: French land register data, which exclude lakes, ponds and glaciers larger than 1 km^{2} (0.386 sq mi or 247 acres) as well as the estuaries of rivers) (50th)

Population
  - January 2026 estimate: ▲69,081,996 (21st)
  - Density: 109/km^{2} (283/sq mi) (106th)
  - Metropolitan France, estimate as of January 2026: ▲66,792,845 (21st)
  - Density: 123/km^{2} (318.6/sq mi) (97th)
- GDP (PPP): 2026 estimate
  - Total: ▲$4.756 trillion (9th)
  - Per capita: ▲$68,852 (25th)
- GDP (nominal): 2026 estimate
  - Total: ▲$3.554 trillion (7th)
  - Per capita: ▲$51,448 (22nd)
- Gini (2025): ▲30.4 medium inequality
- HDI (2023): ▲0.920 very high (26th)
- Currency: Euro (€) (EUR) (Note: Whole of the except the overseas territories in the Pacific Ocean); CFP franc (XPF) (Note: French overseas territories in the Pacific Ocean only)
- Time zone: UTC+1 (CET (Note: Various other time zones are used in overseas France, from UTC−10 (French Polynesia) to UTC+12 (Wallis and Futana). For further information, view Time in France.))
  - Summer (DST): UTC+2 (CEST)
- Calling code: +33 (Note: The overseas regions and collectivities form part of the French telephone numbering plan, but have their own country calling codes: Guadeloupe +590; Martinique +596; French Guiana +594; Réunion and Mayotte +262; Saint Pierre and Miquelon +508. The overseas territories are not part of the French telephone numbering plan; their country calling codes are: New Caledonia +687; French Polynesia +689; Wallis and Futuna +681.)
- ISO 3166 code: FR
- Internet TLD: .fr (Note: In addition to .fr, several other Internet TLDs are used in French overseas départements and territories: .re, .mq, .gp, .tf, .nc, .pf, .wf, .pm, .gf and .yt. The .cat domain is used in Catalan-speaking territories, .eus in Basque-speaking territories and .bzh in Brittany.)

France, (Note: French: [fʁɑ̃s]) officially the French Republic, (Note: French: République française French: [ʁepyblik fʁɑ̃sɛːz]) is a country primarily located in Western Europe. (Note: According to the boundaries of Western Europe used by among others the United Nations geoscheme, CIA World Factbook, and Eurovoc, and going by the Cold War NATO-Warsaw Pact divide) Its overseas regions and territories include French Guiana in South America, Saint Pierre and Miquelon in the North Atlantic, the French West Indies, and many islands in Oceania and the Indian Ocean. Metropolitan France shares borders with Belgium and Luxembourg to the north; Germany to the northeast; Switzerland to the east; Italy and Monaco to the southeast; Andorra and Spain to the south; and a maritime border with the United Kingdom to the northwest. Its metropolitan area extends from the Rhine to the Atlantic Ocean and from the Mediterranean Sea to the English Channel and the North Sea. Its 18 integral regions—five of which are overseas—span a combined area of 632,702 km^{2} (244,288 sq mi), with a total population estimated at over 69.1 million in 2026. Its capital, largest city and main cultural and economic centre is Paris, with a metropolitan population of over 13 million.

Metropolitan France was settled during the Iron Age by Celtic tribes known as Gauls before Rome annexed the area in 51 BC, leading to a distinct Gallo-Roman culture. In the Early Middle Ages, the Franks formed the kingdom of Francia, which became the heartland of the Carolingian Empire. The Treaty of Verdun of 843 partitioned the empire, with West Francia evolving into the Kingdom of France. In the High Middle Ages, France was a powerful but decentralised feudal kingdom, but after Philip II defeated the Angevin Empire and won the Battle of Bouvines, it became more centralized and became the most powerful country in Europe. From the mid-14th to the mid-15th centuries, France was plunged into a dynastic conflict with England known as the Hundred Years' War. In the 16th century, French culture flourished during the French Renaissance, and a French colonial empire emerged. Internally, France was dominated by the conflict with the House of Habsburg and the French Wars of Religion between Catholics and Huguenots. France was successful in the Thirty Years' War and further increased its influence during the reign of Louis XIV. Under his rule, the nation built Europe's strongest army, fought a series of wars, and experienced artistic and scientific flourishing.

The French Revolution of 1789 overthrew the ancien régime and produced the Declaration of the Rights of Man, which expresses the nation's ideals to this day. France reached its political and military zenith in the early 19th century under Napoleon Bonaparte, subjugating much of continental Europe and establishing the First French Empire. Its collapse initiated a period of relative decline during which France endured the Bourbon Restoration until the founding of the French Second Republic, which was succeeded by the Second French Empire upon Napoleon III's takeover. His empire collapsed during the Franco-Prussian War in 1870. This led to the establishment of the French Third Republic, as well as a period of economic prosperity and cultural and scientific flourishing known as the Belle Époque. France was one of the major participants of World War I, from which it emerged victorious at great human and economic cost. It was among the Allies of World War II, but it surrendered and was occupied by Germany in 1940. Following its liberation in 1944, the short-lived Fourth Republic was established and later dissolved over the course of the Algerian War. The current Fifth Republic, a semi-presidential system, was formed in 1958 by Charles de Gaulle. Algeria and most French colonies became independent in the 1960s, with the majority retaining close economic and military ties with France.

France retains its centuries-long status as a global centre of art, science, cuisine and philosophy. It hosts the fourth-largest number of UNESCO World Heritage Sites, with 54 in total, and is the 4th tourist destination, having received 58 million foreign visitors in 2025. A developed country, France has a high nominal per capita GDP globally, and its economy ranks among the largest in the world by both nominal GDP and PPP-adjusted GDP. It is a great power, being one of the five permanent members of the United Nations Security Council and an official nuclear-weapon state. The country is part of multiple international organisations and forums.

== Etymology ==
Originally applied to the whole Frankish Empire, the name France comes from the Latin Francia, or 'realm of the Franks'. The name of the Franks is related to the English word frank ('free'): the latter stems from the Old French franc ('free, noble, sincere') and ultimately from the Medieval Latin word francus ('free, exempt from service; a freeman, a Frank'), a generalisation of the tribal name that emerged as a Late Latin borrowing of the reconstructed Frankish endonym *Frank. It has been suggested that the meaning 'free' was adopted because after the conquest of Gaul, only Franks were free of taxation or, more generally, because they had the status of freemen in contrast to servants or slaves. The etymology of *Frank is uncertain. It is traditionally derived from the Proto-Germanic word *frankōn, which translates to 'javelin' or 'lance' (the throwing axe of the Franks was known as the francisca), although these weapons may have been named because of their use by the Franks, not the other way around.

In English, 'France' is pronounced /fræns/ FRANSS in American English and /frɑːns/ FRAHNSS or /fræns/ FRANSS in British English. The pronunciation with /ɑː/ is mostly confined to accents with the trap–bath split, such as Received Pronunciation, though it can be also heard in some other dialects, such as Cardiff English.

== History ==
=== Prehistory ===
The oldest traces of archaic humans in what is now France date from approximately 1.8 million years ago. Neanderthals occupied the region into the Upper Paleolithic era but were slowly replaced by Homo sapiens around 35,000 BC. This period witnessed the emergence of cave painting in the Dordogne and Pyrenees, including at Lascaux, dated to c. 18,000 BC. At the end of the Last Glacial Period (10,000 BC), the climate became milder. From approximately 7,000 BC, this part of Western Europe entered the Neolithic era, and its inhabitants became sedentary.

After demographic and agricultural development between the 4th and 3rd millennia BC, metallurgy appeared, initially working gold, copper and bronze, then later iron. France has numerous megalithic sites from the Neolithic, including the Carnac stones site (approximately 3,300 BC).

=== Antiquity (6th century BC – 5th century AD) ===
In 600 BC, Ionian Greeks from Phocaea founded the colony of Massalia (present-day Marseille). Celtic tribes penetrated parts of eastern and northern France, spreading through the rest of the country between the 5th and 3rd century BC. Around 390 BC, the Gallic chieftain Brennus and his troops made their way to Roman Italy, defeated the Romans in the Battle of the Allia, and besieged and ransomed Rome. This left Rome weakened, and the Gauls continued to harass the region until 345 BC, when they entered into a peace treaty. However, the Romans and the Gauls remained adversaries for centuries.

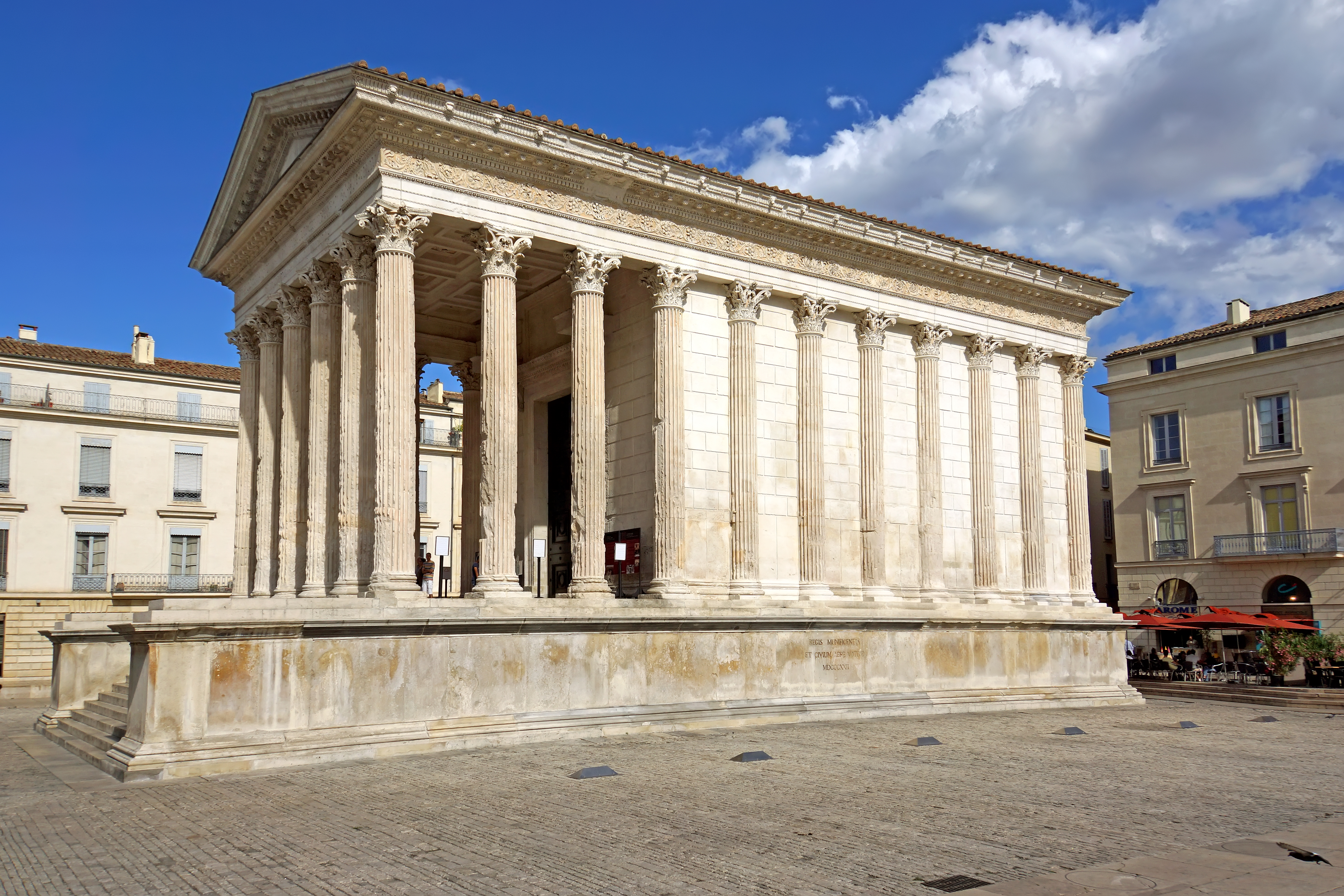
The Maison carrée was a temple of the Gallo-Roman city of Nemausus (present-day Nîmes) and is one of the best-preserved Roman temples anywhere.

Around 125 BC, the south of Gaul was conquered by the Romans, who called this region Provincia Nostra ("Our Province"), which evolved into Provence in French. Julius Caesar conquered the remainder of Gaul and overcame a revolt by Gallic chieftain Vercingetorix in 52 BC. Gaul was divided by Augustus into provinces, and many cities were founded during the Gallo-Roman period, including Lugdunum (present-day Lyon), the capital of the Gauls. In 250–290 AD, Roman Gaul suffered a crisis with its fortified borders attacked by barbarians. The situation improved in the first half of the 4th century, a period of revival and prosperity. In 312, Emperor Constantine I converted to Christianity. The Christian demographic, who had been persecuted, increased. However, the onset of the 5th century marked the resumption of major tribal migrations. Teutonic tribes invaded the region, the Visigoths settling in the southwest, the Burgundians along the Rhine Valley, and the Franks in the north.

=== Early Middle Ages (5th–10th century) ===
In late antiquity, Gaul was divided into Germanic kingdoms and a remaining Gallo-Roman territory. Celtic Britons, fleeing the Anglo-Saxon settlement of Britain, settled in west Armorica; the Armorican peninsula was renamed Brittany, and Celtic culture was revived.

The first leader to unite all Franks was Clovis I, who began his reign as king of the Salian Franks in 481, routing the last forces of the Roman governors in 486. Clovis said he would be baptised a Christian in the event of victory against the Visigothic Kingdom, which was said to have guaranteed the battle. Clovis regained the southwest from the Visigoths and was baptised in 508. Clovis was the first Germanic conqueror after the Fall of the Western Roman Empire to convert to Catholic Christianity; thus, France was given the title "Eldest daughter of the Church" by the papacy, and French kings were called "the Most Christian Kings of France".

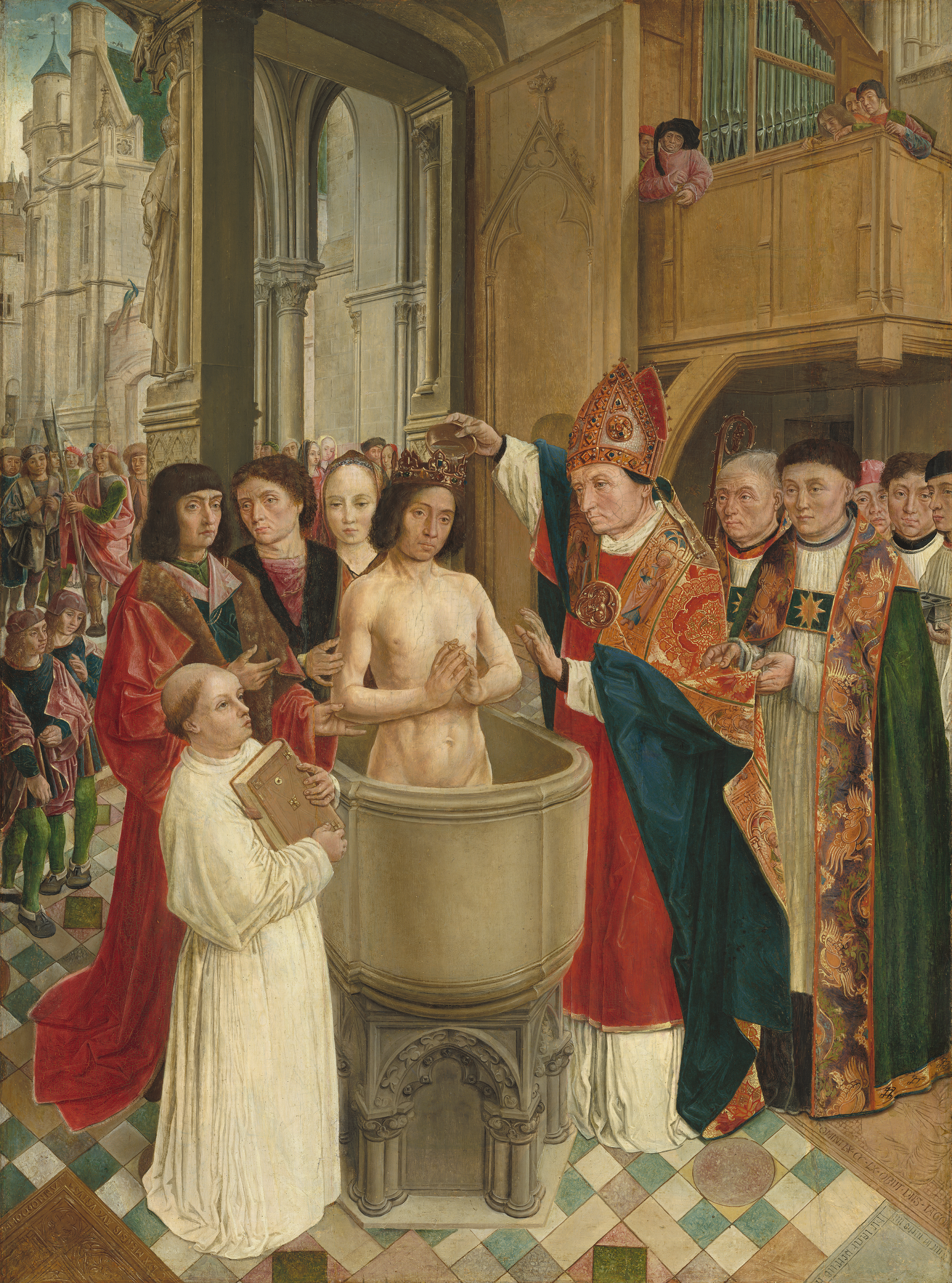
With Clovis's conversion to Catholicism in 498, the Frankish monarchy, elective and secular until then, became hereditary and of divine right.

The Franks embraced the Christian Gallo-Roman culture, and Gaul was renamed Francia ("Land of the Franks"). The Germanic Franks adopted Romanic languages. Clovis made Paris his capital and established the Merovingian dynasty, but his kingdom would not survive his death. The Franks treated land as a private possession and divided it among their heirs, so four kingdoms emerged from that of Clovis: Paris, Orléans, Soissons, and Rheims. The last Merovingian kings lost power to their mayors of the palace (head of household). One mayor of the palace, Charles Martel, defeated an Umayyad invasion at the Battle of Tours in 732. His son, Pepin the Short, seized the crown of Francia from the weakened Merovingians and founded the Carolingian dynasty. Pepin's son Charlemagne reunited the Frankish kingdoms and built an empire across Western and Central Europe.

Proclaimed Holy Roman Emperor by Pope Leo III and thus establishing the French government's longtime historical association with the Catholic Church, Charlemagne tried to revive the Western Roman Empire and its cultural grandeur. Charlemagne's son Louis I kept the empire united, although it was divided between Louis' three sons into East Francia, Middle Francia and West Francia in 843. West Francia approximated the area occupied by modern France and was its precursor.

Throughout the 9th and 10th centuries, incessant Viking raids severely weakened the Carolingian monarchy, accelerating the fragmentation of West Francia into a decentralised, feudal society. As central authority faltered, local nobility secured hereditary rights to their titles and lands, creating a system where the king's authority became more religious and symbolic than secular, frequently challenged by powerful territorial princes. After the Battle of Hastings in 1066, William the Conqueror added "King of England" to his titles, becoming vassal and the equal of the king of France, creating recurring tensions.

=== High and Late Middle Ages (10th–15th century) ===
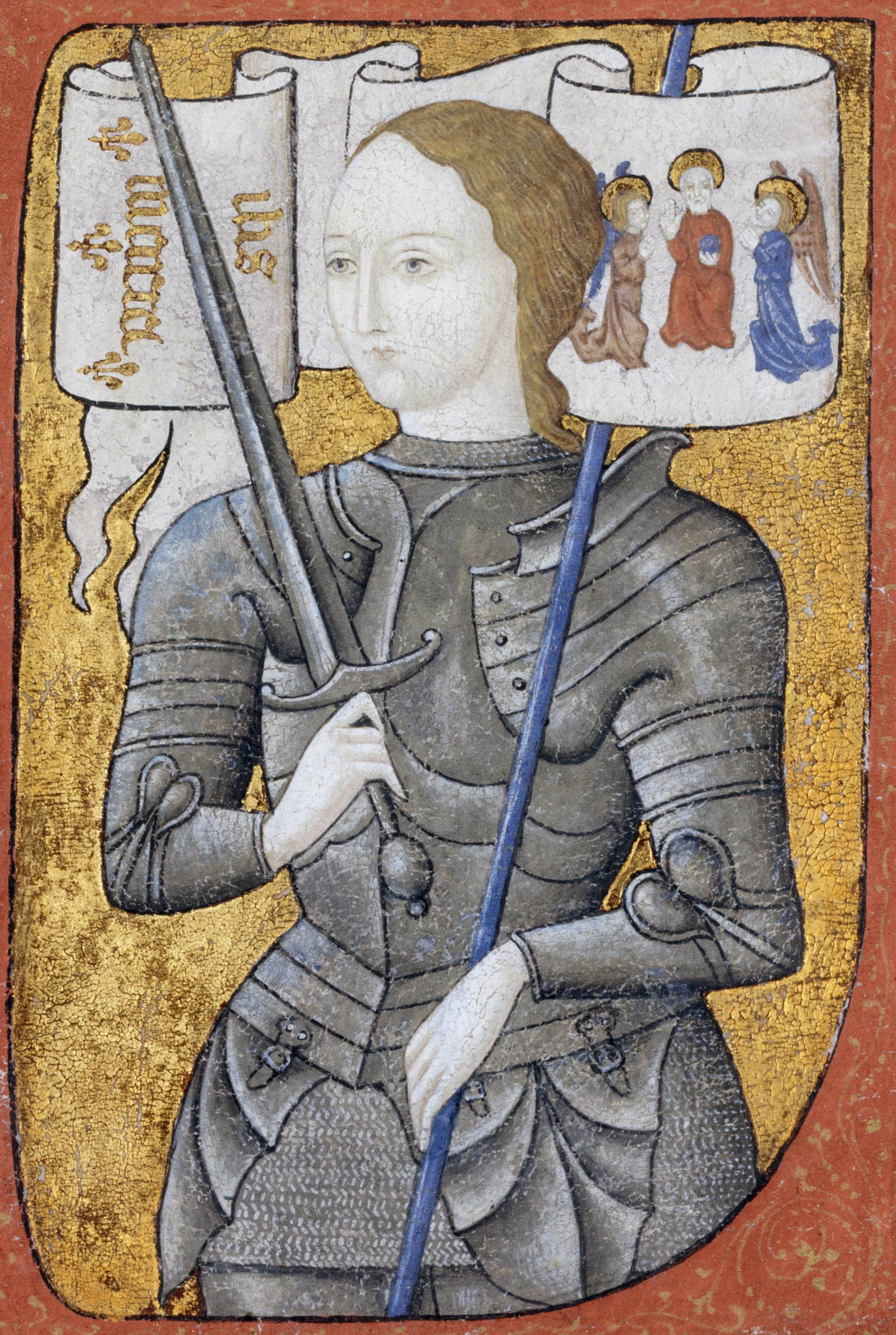
Joan of Arc led the French Army to several important victories during the Hundred Years' War (1337–1453), which paved the way for the final victory.

The Carolingian dynasty ruled France until 987, when Hugh Capet was crowned king of the Franks. His descendants unified the country through wars and inheritance. From 1190, the Capetian rulers began to be referred as "kings of France" rather than "kings of the Franks". Later kings expanded their directly possessed domaine royal to cover over half of modern France by the 15th century. Royal authority became more assertive, centred on a hierarchically conceived society distinguishing nobility, clergy, and commoners.

The nobility played a prominent role in Crusades to restore Christian access to the Holy Land. French knights made up most reinforcements in the 200 years of the Crusades, in such a fashion that the Arabs referred to crusaders as Franj. French Crusaders imported French into the Levant, making Old French the base of the lingua franca ("Frankish language") of the Crusader states. The Albigensian Crusade was launched in 1209 to eliminate the heretical Cathars in the southwest of modern-day France.

From the 11th century, the House of Plantagenet, rulers of the County of Anjou, established its dominion over the surrounding provinces of Maine and Touraine, then built an "empire" from England to the Pyrenees, covering half of modern France. Tensions between France and the Plantagenet empire would last a hundred years, until Philip II of France conquered most of its continental possessions between 1202 and 1214 and defeated the Angevin coalition at the Battle of Bouvines, leaving only England and Aquitaine to the Plantagenets. Following this victory, France became the most prosperous and powerful kingdom in Europe.

Charles IV the Fair died without an heir in 1328. The crown passed to Philip of Valois rather than Edward Plantagenet, who had become Edward III of England the previous year. During the reign of Philip, the monarchy reached the height of its medieval power. Edward contested Philip's throne in 1337, beginning the intermittent Hundred Years' War between England and France. Boundaries changed, but landholdings inside France by English kings remained extensive for decades. With charismatic leaders such as Joan of Arc, French counterattacks won back most English continental territories. France was struck by the Black Death, from which half of the 17 million population died.

=== Early modern period (15th century–1789) ===
The French Renaissance saw cultural development and standardisation of French, which became the official language of France and Europe's aristocracy. France became rivals of the House of Habsburg during the Italian Wars, which would dictate much of their later foreign policy until the mid-18th century. French explorers claimed lands in the Americas, paving expansion of the French colonial empire. The rise of Protestantism led France to a series of civil wars known as the French Wars of Religion. Huguenots subsequently emigrated in significant numbers to Protestant regions including England, the Dutch Republic, and German Protestant states. The wars were ended by Henri IV's Edict of Nantes, which granted some freedom of religion to the Huguenots. Spanish troops assisted the Catholics from 1589 to 1594 and invaded France in 1597. Spain and France returned to all-out war between 1635 and 1659. The Franco-Spanish War cost France 300,000 casualties; total deaths on both sides were 200,000.

Under Louis XIII, Cardinal Richelieu promoted centralisation of the state and reinforced royal power. He destroyed castles of defiant lords and denounced the use of private armies. By the end of the 1620s, Richelieu established "the royal monopoly of force". France fought in the Thirty Years' War, supporting the Protestant side against the Habsburgs. From the 16th to the 19th century, France was responsible for about 10% of the transatlantic slave trade.

Louis XIV, the "Sun King", was the absolute monarch of France who made the country the leading power in Europe.

During Louis XIV's minority, trouble known as The Fronde occurred. This rebellion was driven by feudal lords and sovereign courts as a reaction to the royal absolute power. The monarchy reached its peak during the 17th century and reign of Louis XIV, during which France further increased its influence. By turning lords into courtiers at the Palace of Versailles, his command of the military went unchallenged. By the mid-17th century, France had emerged as the dominant power in Europe. Under the reign of Louis XIV, it built Europe's strongest army, fought a series of wars, and experienced remarkable artistic and scientific flourishing. It also became the most populous European country and had tremendous influence over European politics, economy, and culture. French became the most-used language in diplomacy, science, and literature until the 20th century. France took control of territories in the Americas, Africa and Asia. In 1685, Louis XIV revoked the Edict of Nantes, forcing thousands of Huguenots into exile and published the Code Noir providing the legal framework for slavery and expelling Jews from French colonies.

Under the wars of Louis XV, France lost New France and most Indian possessions after its defeat in the Seven Years' War (1756–1763). Its European territory continued to expand, however, with acquisitions such as Lorraine and Corsica. Louis XV's weak rule, including the decadence of his court, discredited the monarchy, which in part paved the way for the French Revolution.

Louis XVI supported America with money, fleets and armies, helping them win independence from Great Britain. France gained revenge but verged on bankruptcy—a factor that contributed to the Revolution. Some of the Enlightenment occurred in French intellectual circles, and scientific breakthroughs, such as the naming of oxygen and the first hot air balloon carrying passengers, were achieved by French scientists. French explorers took part in the voyages of scientific exploration through maritime expeditions. Enlightenment philosophy, in which reason is advocated as the primary source of legitimacy, undermined the power of and support for the monarchy and was a factor in the Revolution.

=== Revolutionary France (1789–1799) ===
The Storming of the Bastille on 14 July 1789 was the most emblematic event of the French Revolution.

The French Revolution was a period of political and societal change that began with the Estates General of 1789, and ended with the coup of 18 Brumaire in 1799, leading to the formation of the French Consulate. Many of its ideas are fundamental principles of liberal democracy, while its values and institutions remain central to modern political discourse.

Its causes were a combination of social, political and economic factors, which the Ancien Régime proved unable to manage. A financial crisis and social distress led in May 1789 to the convocation of the Estates General, which was converted into a National Assembly in June. The Storming of the Bastille on 14 July led to a series of radical measures by the Assembly, among them the abolition of feudalism, state control over the Catholic Church in France, and a declaration of rights.

The next three years were dominated by a struggle for political control, exacerbated by economic depression. Military defeats following the outbreak of the French Revolutionary Wars in April 1792 resulted in the insurrection of 10 August 1792. The monarchy was abolished and replaced by the French First Republic in September, while Louis XVI was executed in January 1793.

After another revolt in June 1793, the constitution was suspended and power passed from the National Convention to the Committee of Public Safety. About 16,000 people were executed in a Reign of Terror, which ended in July 1794. Weakened by external threats and internal opposition, the Republic was replaced in 1795 by the Directory. In 1799, the Consulate seized power in a coup led by Napoleon.

=== Napoleonic France (1799–1815) ===
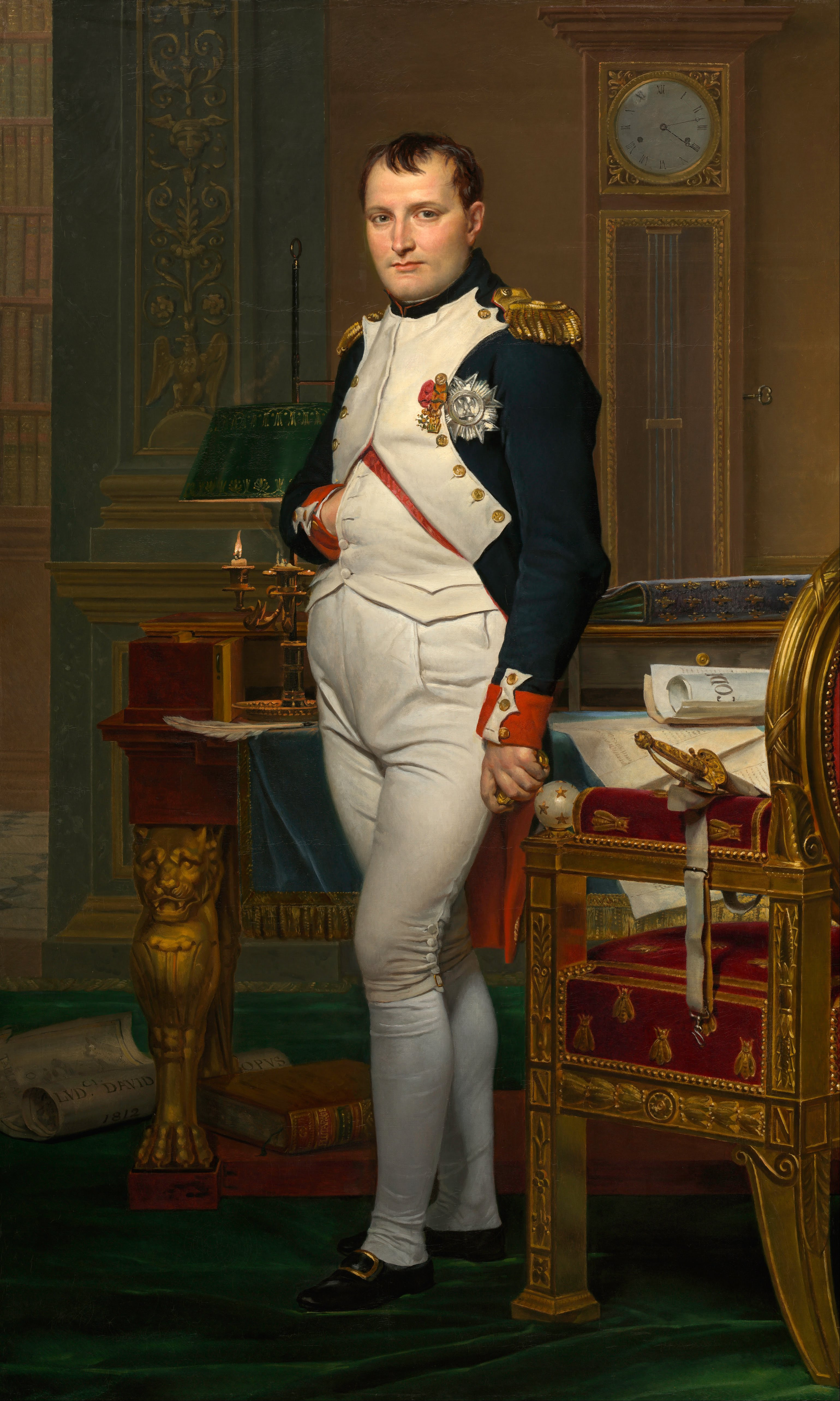
Napoleon, Emperor of the French, built a vast empire across Europe.

Napoleon became First Consul in 1799 and later Emperor of the French Empire. Changing sets of European coalitions declared wars on Napoleon's empire. His armies conquered most of continental Europe with swift victories such as the Austerlitz, Jena-Auerstadt and Battle of Friedland. Members of the Bonaparte family were appointed monarchs in some of the newly established kingdoms.

These victories led to the expansion of French revolutionary ideals and reforms, such as the metric system, Napoleonic Code and Declaration of the Rights of Man. In 1812, Napoleon attacked Russia, reaching Moscow. Thereafter his army disintegrated through supply problems, disease, Russian attacks, and finally winter. After this catastrophic campaign and the ensuing uprising of European monarchies against his rule, Napoleon was defeated. About 306,000 to a million Frenchmen died during the Napoleonic Wars. After his brief return from exile, Napoleon was finally defeated in 1815 at the Battle of Waterloo, and the Bourbon monarchy was restored with new constitutional limitations.

=== Colonial empire ===
The discredited Bourbon dynasty was overthrown by the July Revolution of 1830, which established the constitutional July Monarchy; French troops began the conquest of Algeria. Unrest led to the French Revolution of 1848 and the end of the July Monarchy. The abolition of slavery and the introduction of male universal suffrage was re-enacted in 1848. In 1852, president of the French Republic, Louis-Napoléon Bonaparte, Napoleon I's nephew, was proclaimed emperor of the Second Empire, as Napoleon III. He multiplied French interventions abroad, especially in Crimea, Mexico and Italy. Napoleon III was unseated following defeat in the Franco-Prussian War of 1870, and his regime was replaced by the Third Republic. By 1875, the French conquest of Algeria was complete, with approximately 825,000 Algerians killed from famine, disease, and violence. France suffered an estimated 10,000 killed and 35,000 wounded across all colonial campaigns. A few thousand died in Mexico and Vietnam, while the vast majority perished in Algeria. Disease claimed an even heavier toll; one estimate puts total French and Foreign Legion deaths from battle and disease for the entire 19th century at 110,000.

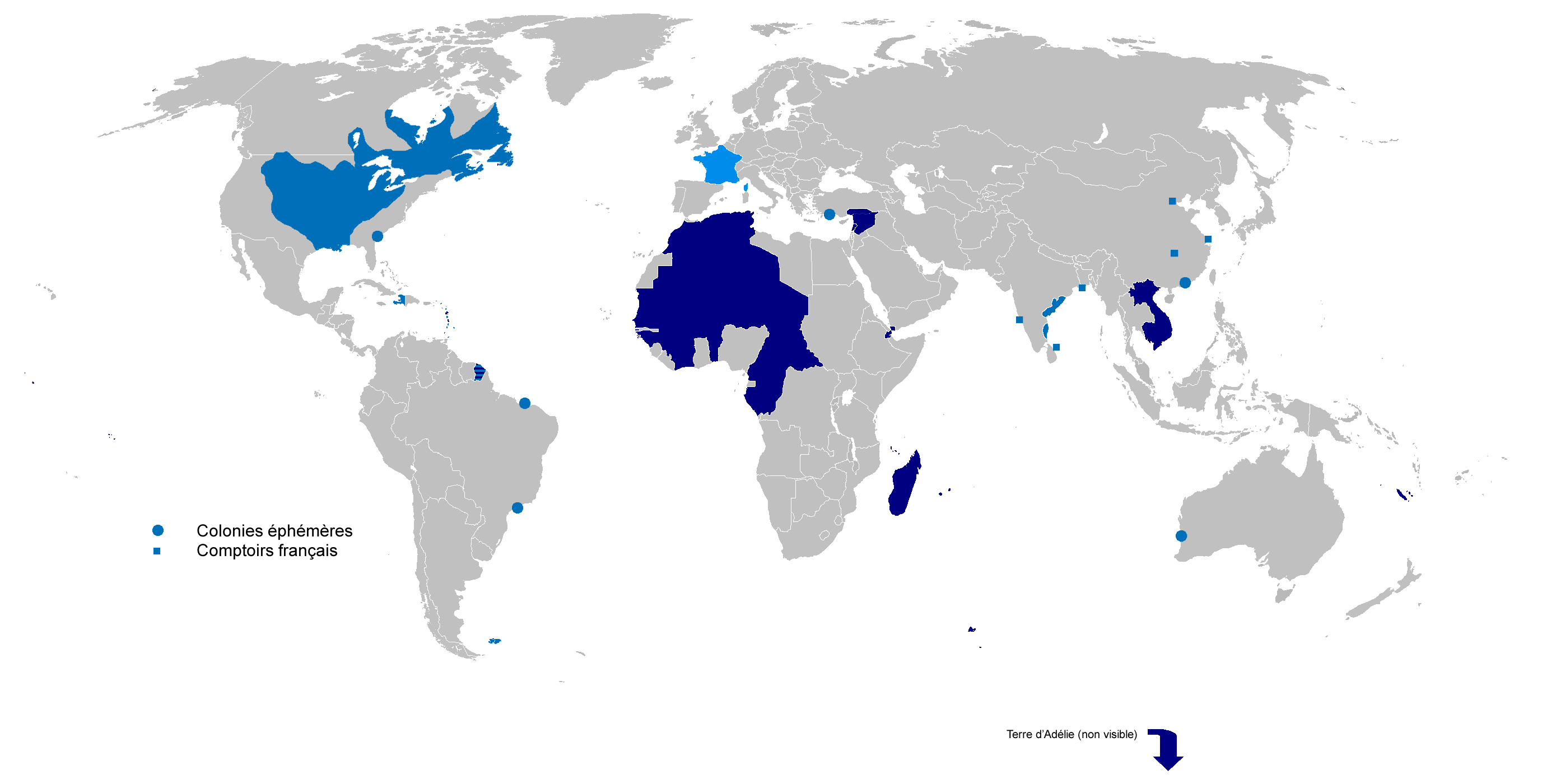
French colonial empires: First Second

France had colonial possessions since the beginning of the 17th century, but in the 19th and 20th centuries its empire extended significantly and became the second-largest behind the British Empire. Including metropolitan France, the total area reached almost 13 million square kilometres in the 1920s and 1930s, 9% of the world's land. Known as the Belle Époque, the turn of the century was characterised by optimism, regional peace, economic prosperity and technological, scientific and cultural innovations. In 1905, state secularism was officially established.

=== Early to mid-20th century (1914–1946) ===
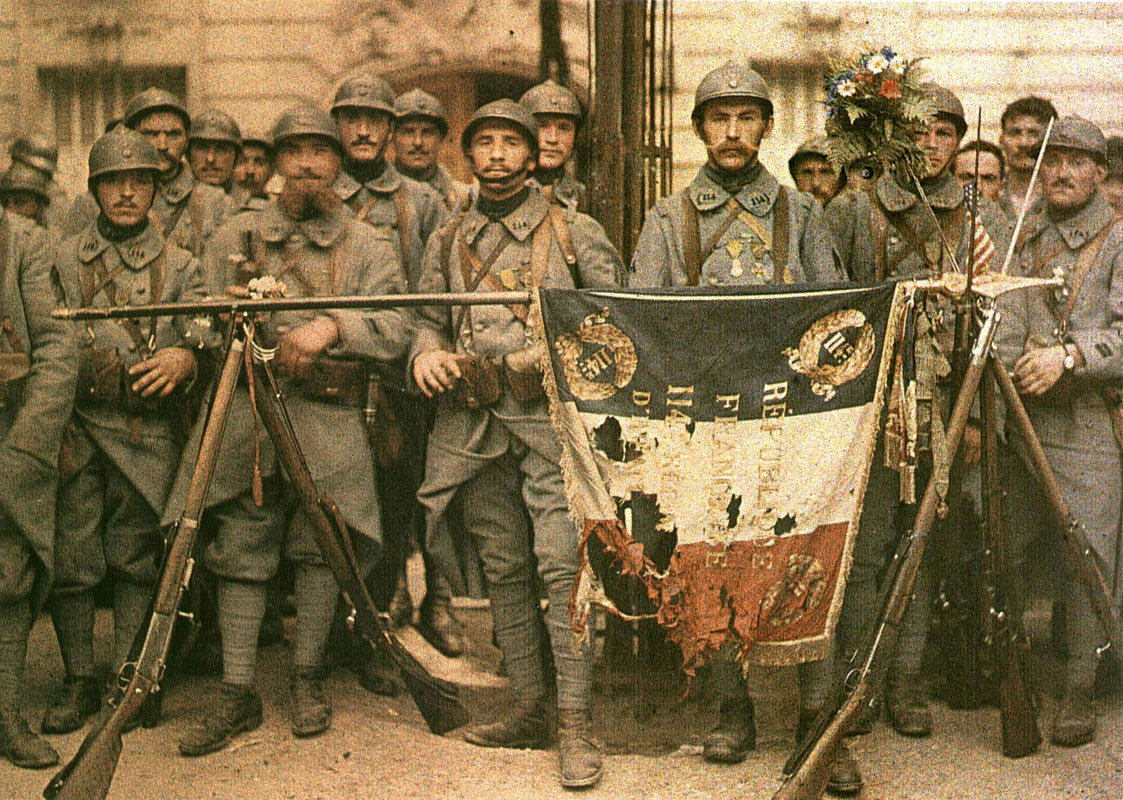
French Poilus posing with their war-torn flag in 1917, during World War I

During World War I, France played a decisive role in defeating the Central Powers as part of the Triple Entente, while participating in the majority of the war's major battles fought on the Western Front. A rich industrial area in the north was occupied. France and the Allies emerged victorious against the Central Powers at tremendous human cost. It left 1.4 million French soldiers dead, 4% of its population. In addition, France suffered 4,266,000 wounded. Interwar was marked by intense international tensions and social reforms introduced by the Popular Front government (e.g., annual leave, eight-hour workdays, women in government).

In 1940, France was invaded and quickly defeated by Nazi Germany. France was divided into a German occupation zone in the north, an Italian occupation zone and an unoccupied territory, the rest of France, which consisted of southern France and the French empire. The Vichy government, an authoritarian regime collaborating with Germany, ruled the unoccupied territory. Free France, the government-in-exile led by Charles de Gaulle, was set up in London.

From 1942 to 1944, about 160,000 French citizens, including around 75,000 Jews, were deported to death and concentration camps. On 6 June 1944, the Allies invaded Normandy, and in August they invaded Provence. The Allies and French Resistance emerged victorious, and French sovereignty was restored with the Provisional Government of the French Republic (GPRF). This interim government, established by de Gaulle, continued to wage war against Germany and to purge collaborators from office. It made important reforms e.g. suffrage extended to women and the creation of a social security system.

=== 1946–present ===
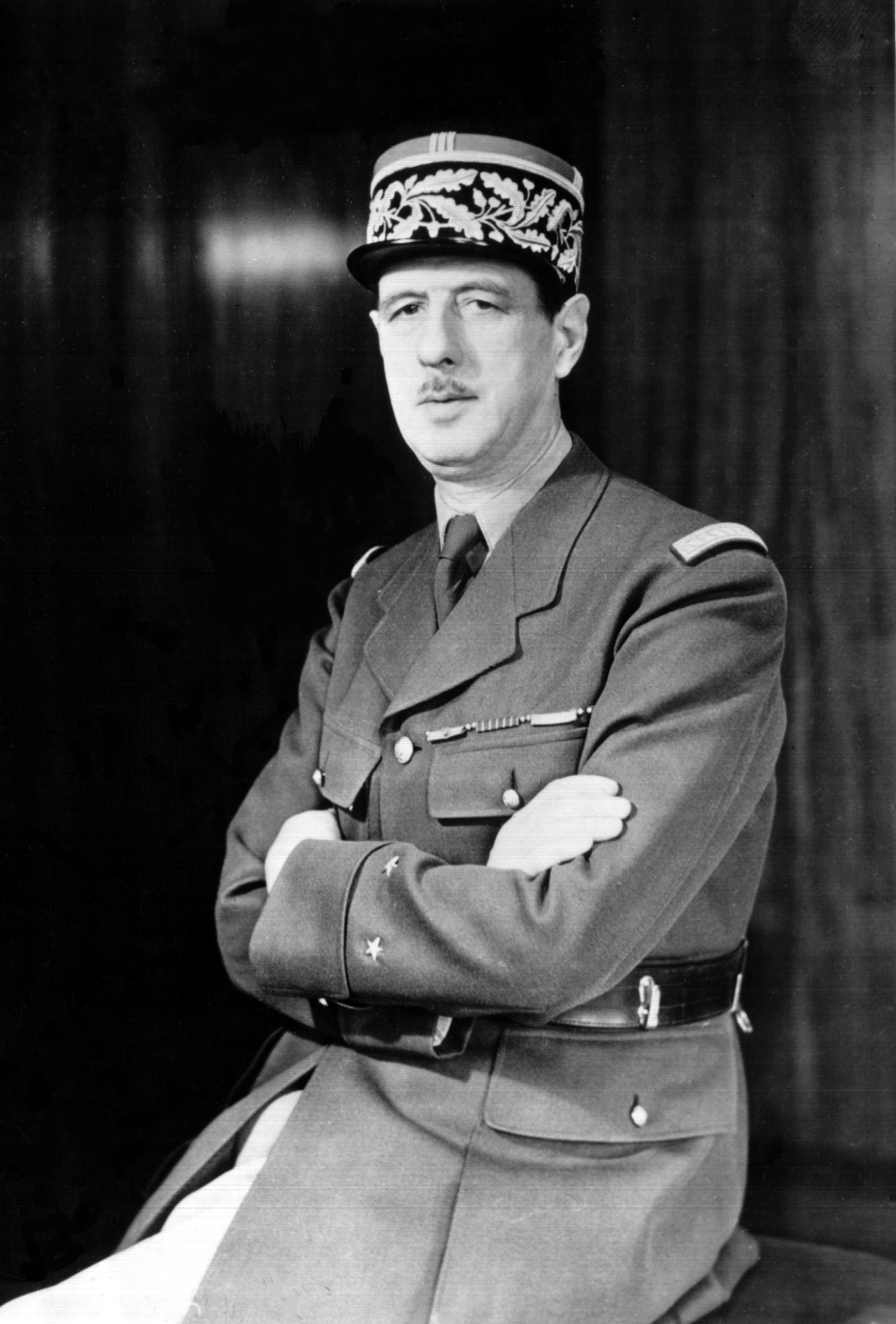
Charles de Gaulle, a hero of World War I, leader of the Free French during World War II, and President of France

A new constitution resulted in the Fourth Republic (1946–1958), which saw strong economic growth (les Trente Glorieuses). France was a founding member of NATO and attempted to regain control of French Indochina, but was defeated by the Viet Minh in 1954. France faced another anti-colonialist conflict in Algeria, then part of France and home to over one million European settlers (Pied-Noir). The French systematically used torture and repression, including extrajudicial killings to keep control. This conflict nearly led to a coup and civil war.

During the May 1958 crisis, the weak Fourth Republic gave way to the Fifth Republic, which included a strengthened presidency. The war concluded with the Évian Accords in 1962 which led to Algerian independence, at a high price: between half a million and one million deaths and over 2 million internally-displaced Algerians. Around one million Pied-Noirs and Harkis fled from Algeria to France. A vestige of the empire is the French overseas departments and territories.

During the Cold War, de Gaulle pursued a policy of "national independence" towards the Western and Eastern blocs. He withdrew from NATO's military-integrated command (while remaining within the alliance), launched a nuclear development programme and made France the fourth nuclear power. He restored cordial Franco-German relations to create a European counterweight between American and Soviet spheres of influence. However, he opposed any development of a supranational Europe, favouring sovereign nations. The revolt of May 1968 had an enormous social impact; it was a watershed moment when a conservative moral ideal (religion, patriotism, respect for authority) shifted to a more liberal moral ideal (secularism, individualism, sexual revolution). Although the revolt was a political failure (the Gaullist party emerged stronger than before) it announced a split between the French and de Gaulle, who resigned.

In the post-Gaullist era, France remained one of the most developed economies in the world but faced crises that resulted in high unemployment rates and increasing public debt. In the late 20th and early 21st centuries, France has been at the forefront of the development of a supranational European Union, notably by signing the Maastricht Treaty in 1992, establishing the eurozone in 1999 and signing the Treaty of Lisbon in 2007. France has fully reintegrated into NATO and since participated in most NATO-sponsored wars.

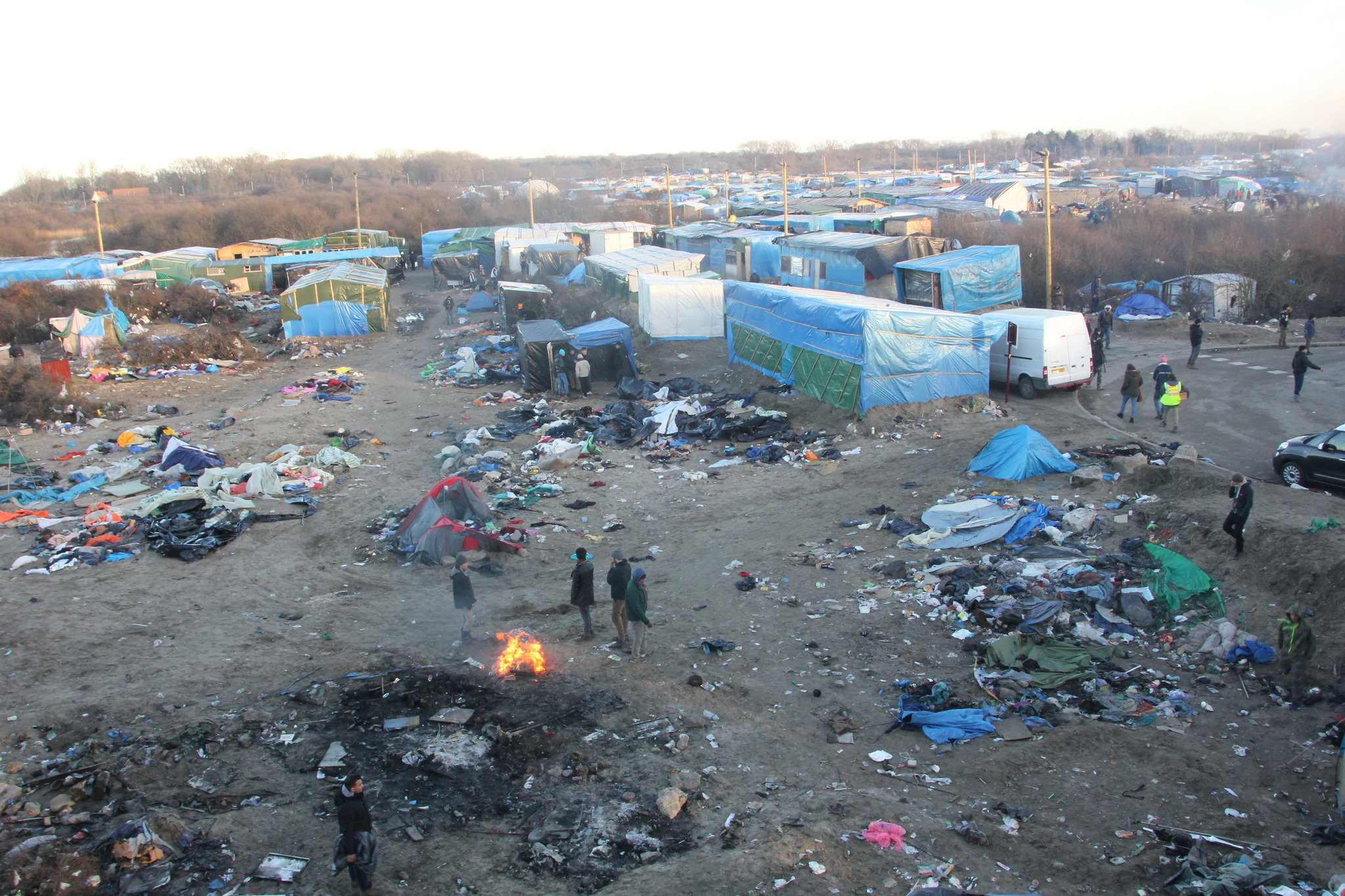
Calais Jungle

Since the 19th century, France has received many immigrants, often male foreign workers from European Catholic countries who generally returned home when not employed. During the 1970s, France faced an economic crisis and allowed new immigrants (mostly from the Maghreb, in northwest Africa) to permanently settle in France with their families and acquire citizenship. It resulted in hundreds of thousands of Muslims living in subsidised public housing and suffering from high unemployment rates. The government had a policy of assimilation of immigrants, where they were expected to adhere to French values and norms. From the 2000s, France experienced continued immigration from Africa, the Middle East, and Asia. In addition, Calais became a transit area for migrants.

Since the 1995 public transport bombings, France has been targeted by Islamist organisations, notably the Charlie Hebdo attack in 2015, which provoked the largest public rallies in French history, gathering 4.4 million people, and the November 2015 Paris attacks, which resulted in 130 deaths, the deadliest attack on French soil since World War II and the deadliest in the European Union since the Madrid train bombings in 2004. Opération Chammal, France's military efforts to contain ISIS, killed over 1,000 ISIS troops between 2014 and 2015.

== Geography ==
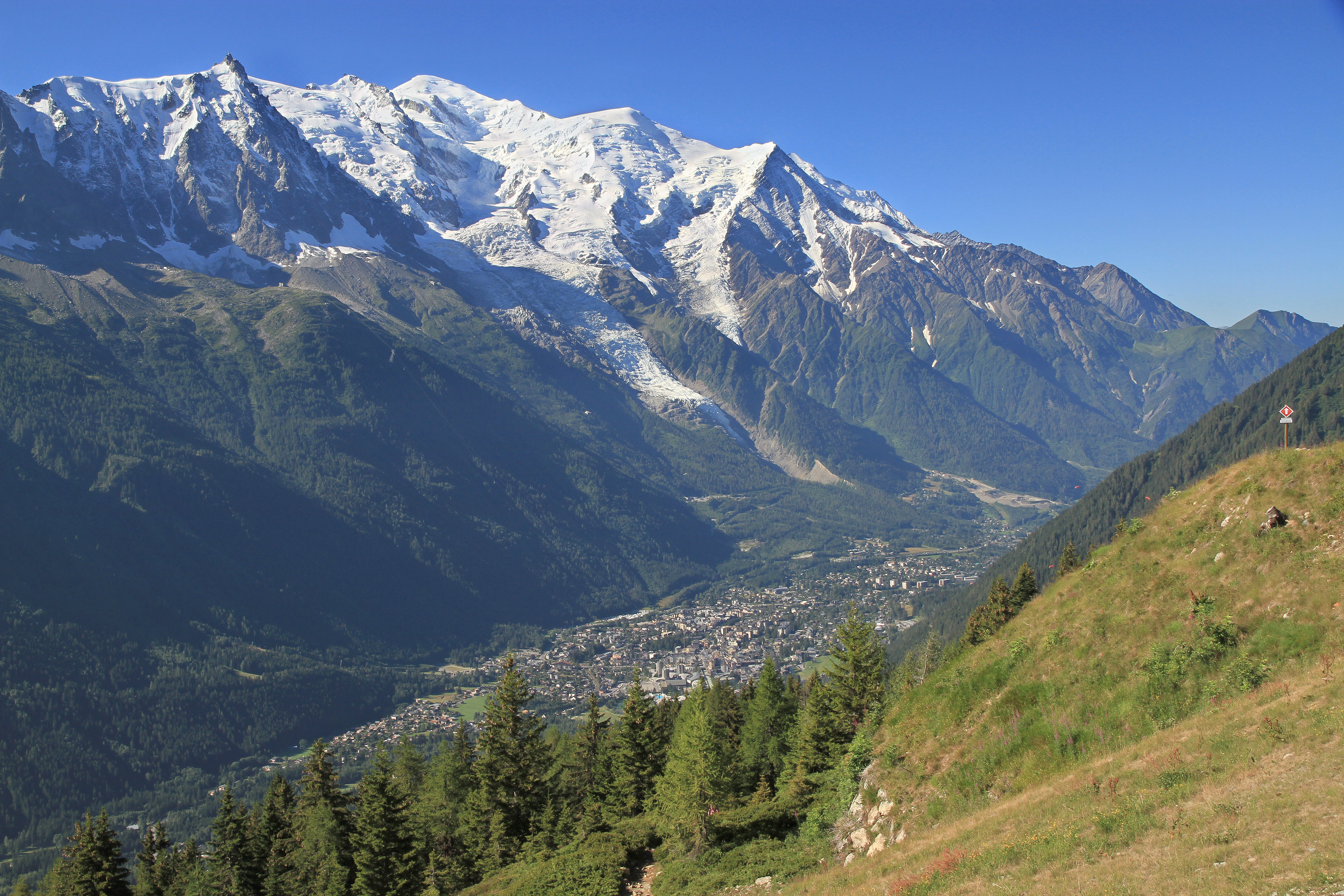
Chamonix valley with Mont Blanc in the background, the highest mountain in the Alps and Western Europe on the border with Italy

The vast majority of France's territory and population is situated in Western Europe and is called Metropolitan France. It is bordered by the North Sea to the north, the English Channel to the northwest, the Atlantic Ocean to the west, and the Mediterranean Sea to the southeast. Its land borders consist of Belgium and Luxembourg in the northeast, Germany and Switzerland in the east, Italy and Monaco in the southeast, and Andorra and Spain in the south and southwest. Except for the northeast, most of France's land borders are roughly delineated by natural boundaries and geographic features: to the south, the Pyrenees and the Alps; to the southeast, the Jura Mountains; and to the east, the Rhine river. Including Overseas France, it also borders Suriname and Brazil through French Guiana in South America, and the Netherlands through Saint Martin in the Caribbean. Metropolitan France includes various coastal islands, of which the largest is Corsica. Metropolitan France is situated mostly between latitudes 41° and 51° N, and longitudes 6° W and 10° E, on the western edge of Europe, and thus lies within the northern temperate zone. Its continental part covers about 1,000 km from north to south and from east to west.

Metropolitan France covers 551,500 square kilometres (212,935 sq mi), the largest among European Union members. France's total land area, with its overseas departments and territories (excluding Adélie Land), is 643,801 km^{2} (248,573 sq mi), 0.45% of the total land area on Earth. France possesses a wide variety of landscapes, from coastal plains in the north and west to the mountain ranges of the Alps in the southeast, the Massif Central in the south-central and Pyrenees in the southwest. With numerous overseas departments and territories scattered across the planet, France possesses the second-largest exclusive economic zone (EEZ) in the world, covering 11,035,000 km^{2} (4,261,000 sq mi). Its EEZ covers approximately 8% of the total surface of all the EEZs of the world.

=== Geology, topography and hydrography ===
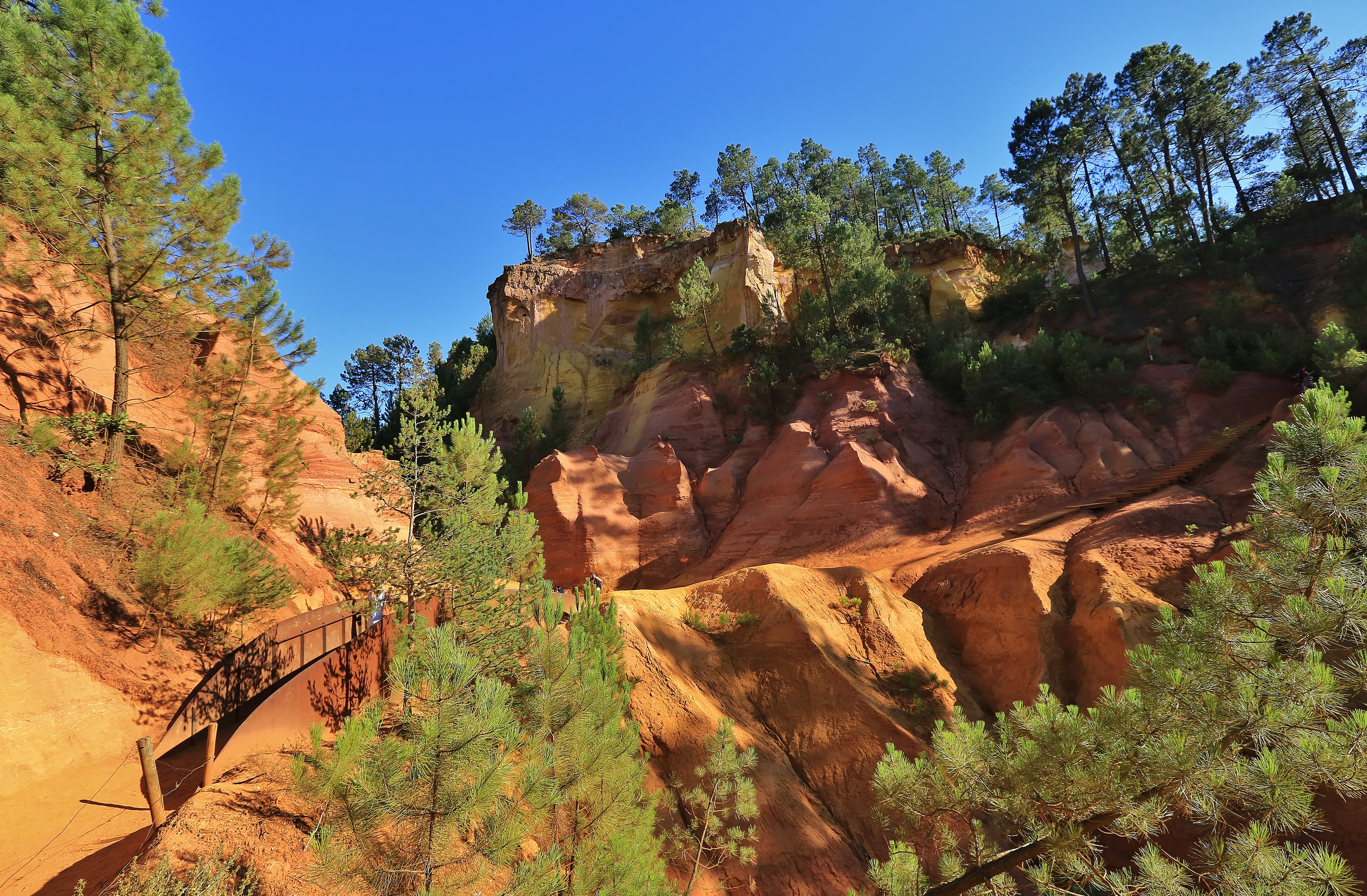
Geological formations near Roussillon, Vaucluse

Metropolitan France has a wide variety of topographic sets and natural landscapes. During the Hercynian uplift in the Paleozoic Era, the Armorican Massif, the Massif Central, the Morvan, the Vosges and Ardennes ranges and the island of Corsica were formed. These massifs delineate several sedimentary basins such as the Aquitaine Basin in the southwest and the Paris Basin in the north. Various routes of natural passage, such as the Rhône Valley, allow easy communication. The Alpine, Pyrenean and Jura Mountains are much younger and have less eroded forms. At 4,810.45 metres (15,782 ft) above sea level, Mont Blanc in the Alps is the highest point in Western Europe. 60% of municipalities are classified as having moderate seismic risk.

The coastlines offer contrasting landscapes: mountain ranges along the French Riviera, coastal cliffs such as the Côte d'Albâtre, and wide sandy plains in the Languedoc. Corsica lies off the Mediterranean coast. France has an extensive river system consisting of the four major rivers: the Seine, the Loire, the Garonne, the Rhône and their tributaries, whose combined catchment includes over 62% of the metropolitan territory. The Rhône divides the Massif Central from the Alps and flows into the Mediterranean Sea at the Camargue. The Garonne meets the Dordogne just after Bordeaux, forming the Gironde estuary, the largest estuary in Western Europe which after approximately 100 kilometres (62 mi) empties into the Atlantic Ocean. Other water courses drain towards the Meuse and Rhine along the northeastern borders. France has 11,000,000 km^{2} (4,200,000 sq mi) of marine waters within three oceans under its jurisdiction, of which 97% are overseas.

=== Environment ===
On 28 June 2019, in Vérargues, the temperature reached 46 °C (115 °F), setting a temperature record in Metropolitan France since records began. Climate change means that this kind of heatwave in France can be expected to occur 10 times more frequently than it would have done a century ago. France was one of the first countries to create an environment ministry, in 1971. France is ranked 19th by carbon dioxide emissions due to the country's heavy investment in nuclear power following the 1973 oil crisis, which now accounts for 75 per cent of its electricity production and results in less pollution. According to the 2020 Environmental Performance Index conducted by Yale and Columbia, France was the fifth most environmentally conscious country in the world. Like all European Union member states, France agreed to cut carbon emissions by at least 20% of 1990 levels by 2020. As of 2009, carbon dioxide emissions per capita are lower than that of China. The country was set to impose a carbon tax in 2009; however, the plan was abandoned due to fears of it burdening French businesses.

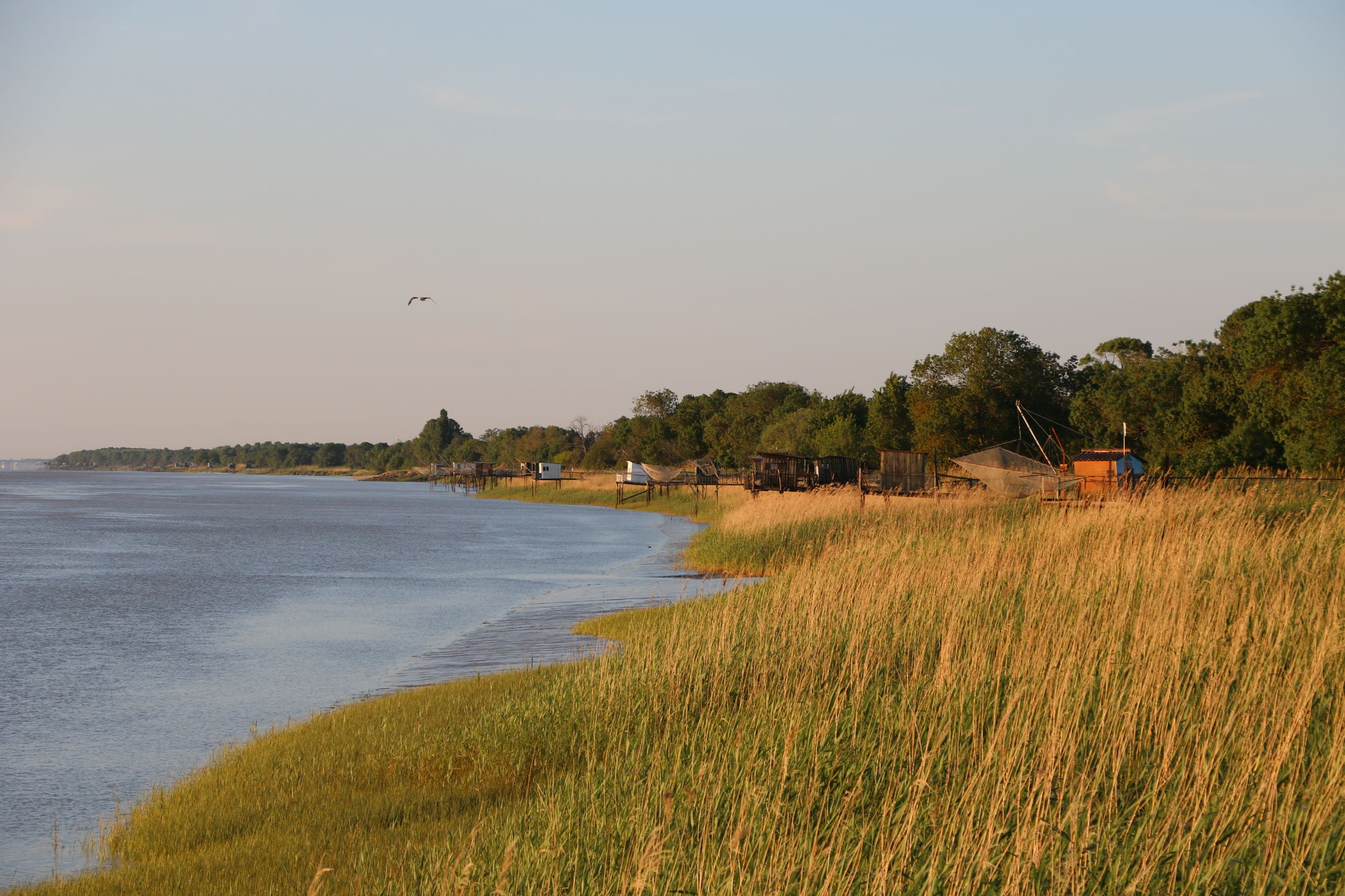
The Gironde estuary is classified as a marine nature park and is part of the Natura 2000 network. The left bank is part of the Médoc regional nature park. With a surface area of 635 km^{2} (245 sq mi), it is the largest estuary in Europe.

Forests account for 31 per cent of the land area—the fourth-highest proportion in Europe—representing an increase of 7 per cent since 1990. The forests are some of the most diverse in Europe, comprising more than 140 species of trees. France had a 2018 Forest Landscape Integrity Index mean score of 4.52/10, ranking it 123rd globally. There are nine national parks and 46 natural parks. A regional nature park (French: parc naturel régional or PNR) is a public establishment in France between local authorities and the national government covering an inhabited rural area of outstanding beauty, to protect the scenery and heritage as well as setting up sustainable economic development in the area. As of 2019, there are 54 PNRs in France.

== Politics ==
France is a representative democracy organised as a unitary semi-presidential republic. Democratic traditions and values are deeply rooted in French culture, identity and politics. The Constitution of the Fifth Republic was approved by referendum in 1958, establishing a framework consisting of executive, legislative and judicial branches. It sought to address the instability of the Third and Fourth Republics by combining elements of both the parliamentary and presidential systems, while greatly strengthening the authority of the executive relative to the legislature.

=== Government ===
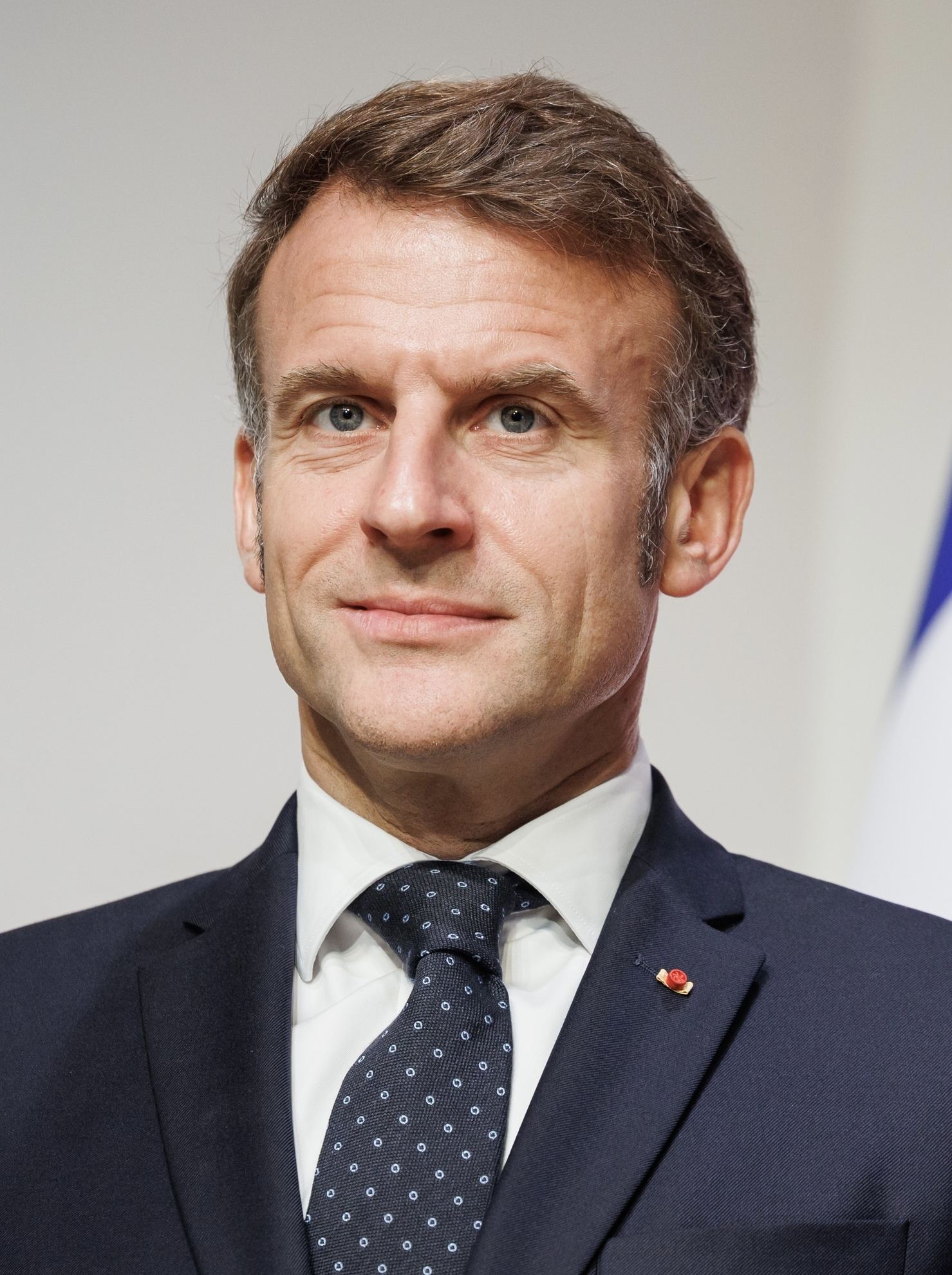
Emmanuel Macron
President

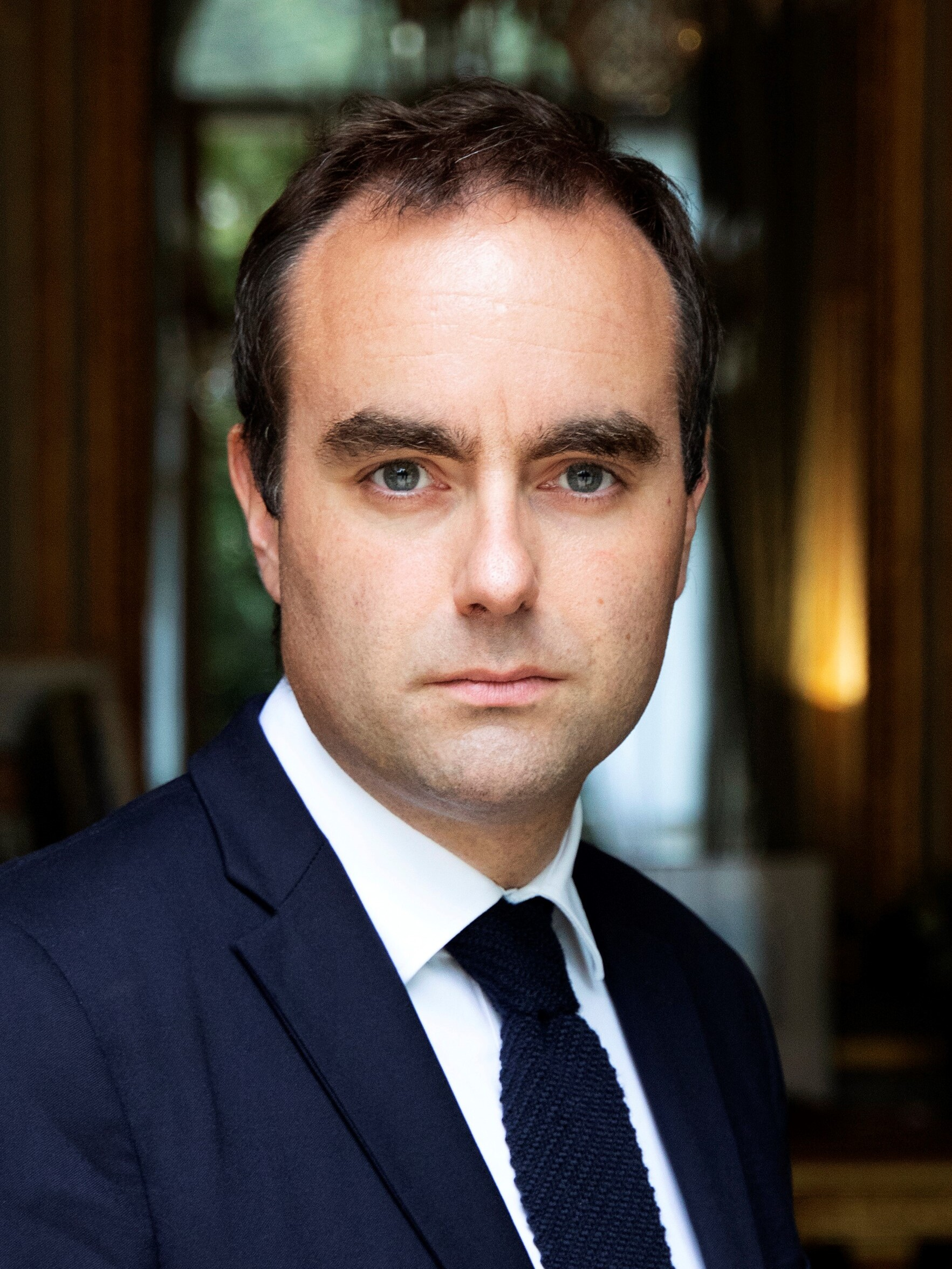
Sébastien Lecornu
Prime Minister

The executive branch has two leaders. The president, who is Emmanuel Macron since 2017, is the head of state, elected directly by universal adult suffrage for a five-year term. The prime minister, who is Sébastien Lecornu since 2025, is the head of government, appointed by the president to lead the government. The president has the power to dissolve parliament or circumvent it by submitting referendums directly to the people; the president also appoints judges and civil servants, negotiates and ratifies international agreements, and serves as commander-in-chief of the French Armed Forces. The prime minister determines public policy and oversees the civil service, with an emphasis on domestic matters. In the 2022 presidential election, Macron was re-elected. Two months later in the legislative elections, Macron lost his parliamentary majority and had to form a minority government.

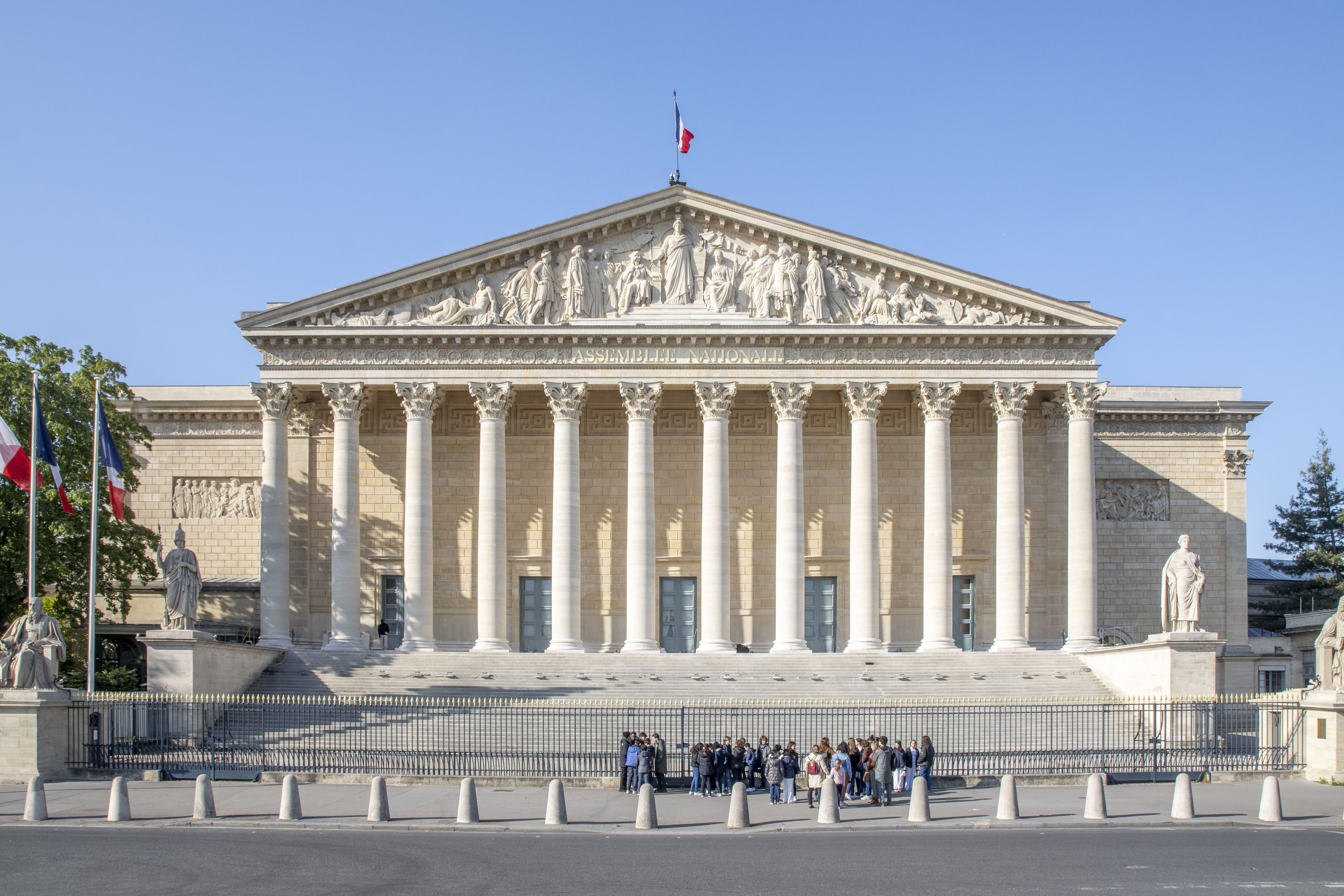
Palais Bourbon is the meeting place of the National Assembly, the lower legislative chamber of the French Parliament.

The legislature consists of the French Parliament, a bicameral body made up of a lower house, the National Assembly, and an upper house, the Senate. Legislators in the National Assembly, known as députés, represent local constituencies and are directly elected for five-year terms. The Assembly has the power to dismiss the government by majority vote. Senators are chosen by an electoral college for six-year terms, with half the seats submitted to election every three years. The Senate's legislative powers are limited; in the event of disagreement between the two chambers, the National Assembly has the final say. The parliament is responsible for determining the rules and principles concerning most areas of law, political amnesty, and fiscal policy; however, the government may draft specific details concerning most laws.

From World War II until 2017, French politics was dominated by two politically opposed groupings: one left-wing, the French Section of the Workers' International, which was succeeded by the Socialist Party in 1969; and the other right-wing, the Gaullist Party, whose name changed over time to the Rally of the French People (1947), the Union of Democrats for the Republic (1958), the Rally for the Republic (1976), the Union for a Popular Movement (2007) and The Republicans (since 2015). In the 2017 presidential and legislative elections, the radical centrist party La République En Marche! (LREM) became the dominant force, overtaking both Socialists and Republicans. LREM's opponent in the second round of the 2017 and 2022 presidential elections was the growing far-right party National Rally (RN). Since 2020, The Ecologists have performed well in mayoral elections in major cities while on a national level, the New Ecological and Social People's Union was the second-largest voting block elected to the lower house in 2022. Right-wing populist RN became the largest opposition party in the National Assembly in 2022.

The electorate is constitutionally empowered to vote on amendments passed by the Parliament and bills submitted by the president. Referendums have played a key role in shaping French politics and even foreign policy; voters have decided on such matters as Algeria's independence, the election of the president by popular vote, the formation of the EU, and the reduction of presidential term limits.

=== Administrative divisions ===
France is divided into 18 regions (located in Europe and overseas), five overseas collectivities (French Polynesia, Saint Pierre and Miquelon, Wallis and Futuna, Saint Barthélemy, and Saint Martin), one overseas territory (French Southern and Antarctic Lands), one special collectivity (New Caledonia), and one uninhabited island (Clipperton) under the authority of the Minister of Overseas France.

==== Regions ====
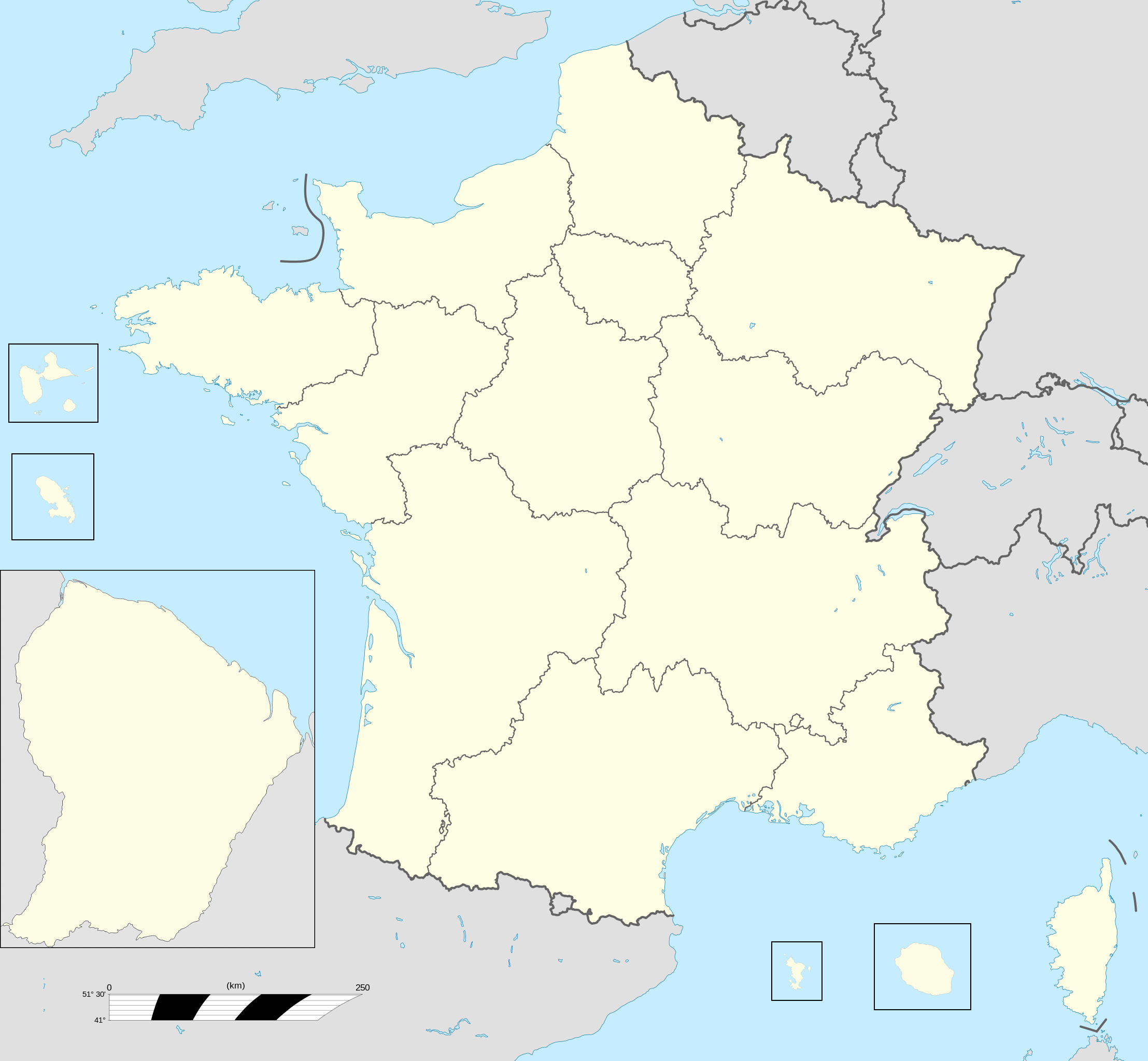

Since 2016, France is divided into 18 administrative regions: 13 regions in metropolitan France (including Corsica), and five overseas. The regions are further subdivided into 101 departments, which are numbered mainly alphabetically. The department number is used in postal codes and was formerly used on vehicle registration plates. Among the 101 French departments, five (French Guiana, Guadeloupe, Martinique, Mayotte, and Réunion) are in overseas regions that are simultaneously overseas departments, enjoying the same status as metropolitan departments and are thereby included in the European Union.

The 101 departments are subdivided into 335 arrondissements, which are, in turn, subdivided into 2,054 cantons. These cantons are divided into 36,658 communes, which are municipalities with an elected municipal council. Three communes—Paris, Lyon and Marseille—are subdivided into 45 municipal arrondissements.

==== Overseas territories and collectivities ====
In addition to the 18 regions and 101 departments, the French Republic has five overseas collectivities (French Polynesia, Saint Barthélemy, Saint Martin, Saint Pierre and Miquelon, and Wallis and Futuna), one sui generis collectivity (New Caledonia), one overseas territory (French Southern and Antarctic Lands), and one island possession in the Pacific Ocean (Clipperton Island). Overseas collectivities and territories form part of the French Republic but do not form part of the European Union or its fiscal area (except for Saint Barthélemy, which seceded from Guadeloupe in 2007). The Pacific Collectivities of French Polynesia, Wallis and Futuna, and New Caledonia continue to use the CFP franc whose value is strictly linked to the euro. The five overseas regions use the euro.

=== Foreign relations ===
France is a founding member of the United Nations and serves as one of the permanent members of the UN Security Council with veto rights. In 2015 it was described as "the best networked state in the world" due to its membership in more international institutions than any other country; these include the G7, World Trade Organization, the Pacific Community and the Indian Ocean Commission. It is an associate member of the Association of Caribbean States and a leading member of the Organisation internationale de la Francophonie of 84 French-speaking countries.

88 states and governments are part of La Francophonie, which promotes values of democracy, multilingualism and cultural diversity. France has been a key member of this global organisation since its inception in 1970.

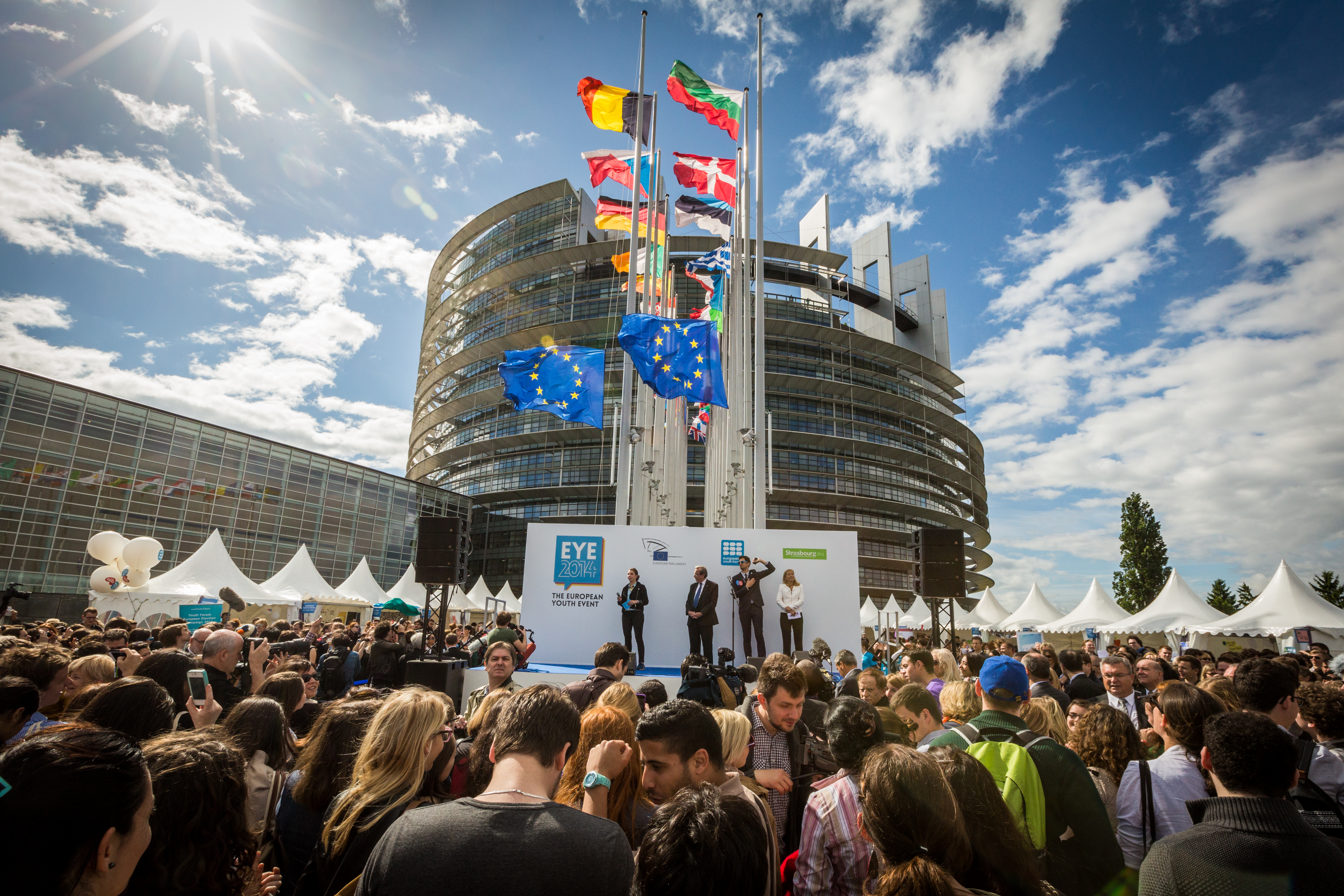
The European Parliament in Strasbourg (near the border with Germany). France is a founding member of all EU institutions.

As a significant hub for international relations, France has the third-largest assembly of diplomatic missions, behind China and the United States. It also hosts the headquarters of several international organisations, including the OECD, UNESCO, Interpol, the International Bureau of Weights and Measures, and the OIF.

French foreign policy after World War II has been largely shaped by membership in the European Union, of which it was a founding member. Since the 1963 Élysée Treaty, France has developed close ties with reunified Germany to become the most influential driving force of the EU. Since 1904 France has maintained an "Entente Cordiale" with the United Kingdom, and there has been a strengthening of ties between the countries, especially militarily.

France is a member of the North Atlantic Treaty Organization (NATO), but under President Charles de Gaulle excluded itself from the joint military command in protest of the Special Relationship between the U.S. and UK, and to preserve the independence of French foreign and security policies. Under Nicolas Sarkozy, France rejoined the NATO joint military command.

France retains strong political and economic influence in its former African colonies (Françafrique) and has supplied economic aid and troops for peacekeeping missions in Ivory Coast and Chad. From 2012 to 2021, France and other African states intervened in support of the Malian government in the Mali War.

In 2017, France was the world's fourth-largest donor of development aid in absolute terms. This represents 0.43% of its GNP. Aid is provided by the governmental French Development Agency, which finances primarily humanitarian projects in sub-Saharan Africa, with an emphasis on "developing infrastructure, access to health care and education, the implementation of appropriate economic policies and the consolidation of the rule of law and democracy".

=== Military ===
The French Armed Forces (Forces armées françaises) are the military and paramilitary forces of France, under the president as commander-in-chief. They consist of the French Army (Armée de Terre), the French Navy (Marine Nationale, formerly called Armée de Mer), the French Air and Space Force (Armée de l'Air et de l'Espace), and the National Gendarmerie (Gendarmerie nationale), which serves as both military police and civil police in rural areas. Together they are among the largest armed forces in the world and the largest in the EU. According to a 2015 study by Crédit Suisse, the French Armed Forces ranked as the world's sixth-most powerful military and the second most powerful in Europe. France's annual military expenditure in 2026 is US$65.3 billion, or 2.1% of its GDP, making it the eighth biggest military spender in the world. There has been no national conscription since 1997.

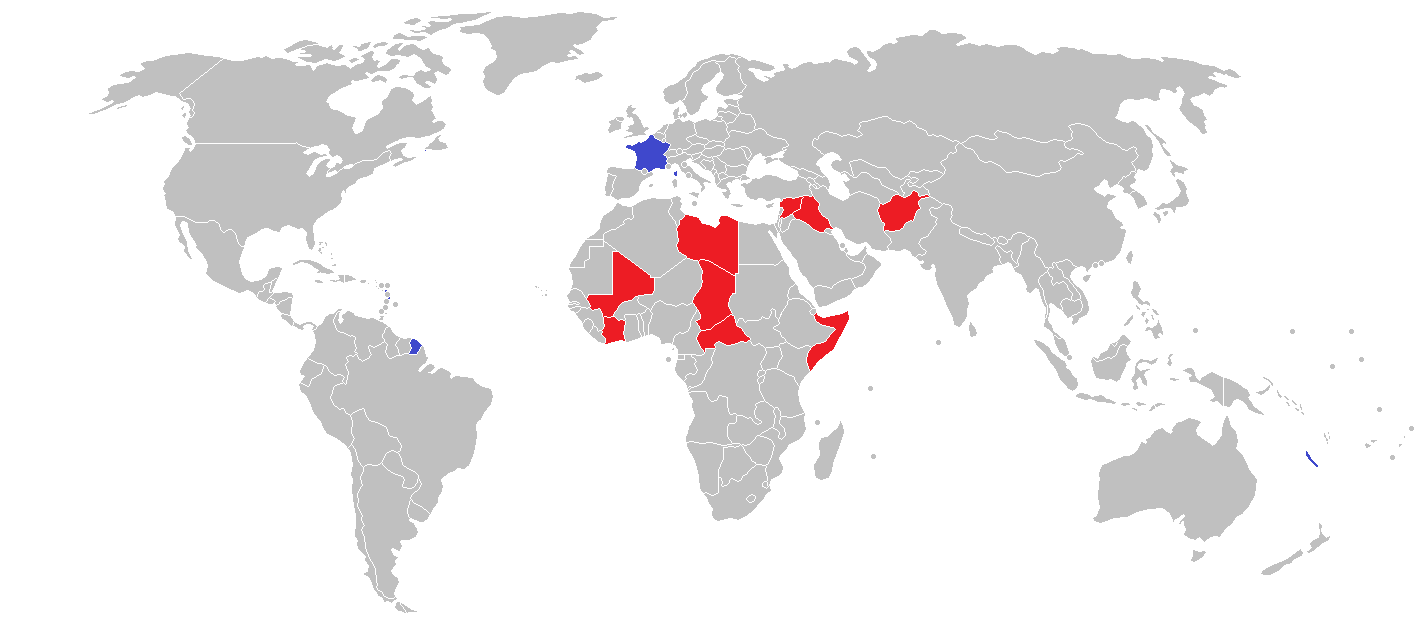
France French military interventions since 2001: Afghanistan; Ivory Coast; Chad; Libya; Somalia; Mali; Central African Republic; Syria; Iraq.

France has been a recognised nuclear state since 1960. It is a party to both the Comprehensive Nuclear-Test-Ban Treaty and the Nuclear Non-Proliferation Treaty. The French nuclear force (formerly known as "Force de Frappe") consists of four Triomphant-class submarines equipped with submarine-launched ballistic missiles. France has about 60 ASMP medium-range air-to-ground missiles with nuclear warheads; 50 are deployed by the Air and Space Force using the Mirage 2000N long-range nuclear strike aircraft, while around 10 are deployed by the French Navy's Super Étendard Modernisé attack aircraft, which operate from the nuclear-powered aircraft carrier Charles de Gaulle.

France has major military industries and one of the largest aerospace sectors in the world. The country has produced such equipment as the Dassault Rafale fighter, the Charles de Gaulle aircraft carrier, the Exocet missile, and the Leclerc tank, among others. France is a major arms seller, with most of its arsenal's designs available for the export market, except for nuclear-powered devices. Weapons exported totalled 27 billion euros in 2022, up from 11.7 billion euros the previous year. The UAE contributed more than 16 billion euros arms to the French total. Among the largest French defence companies are Dassault, Thales and Safran.

The Directorate General for External Security is a component of the Armed Forces under the authority of the Ministry of Defence. The General Directorate for Internal Security operates under the authority of the Ministry of the Interior. France's cybersecurity capabilities are regularly ranked as some of the most robust of any nation in the world.

=== Law ===
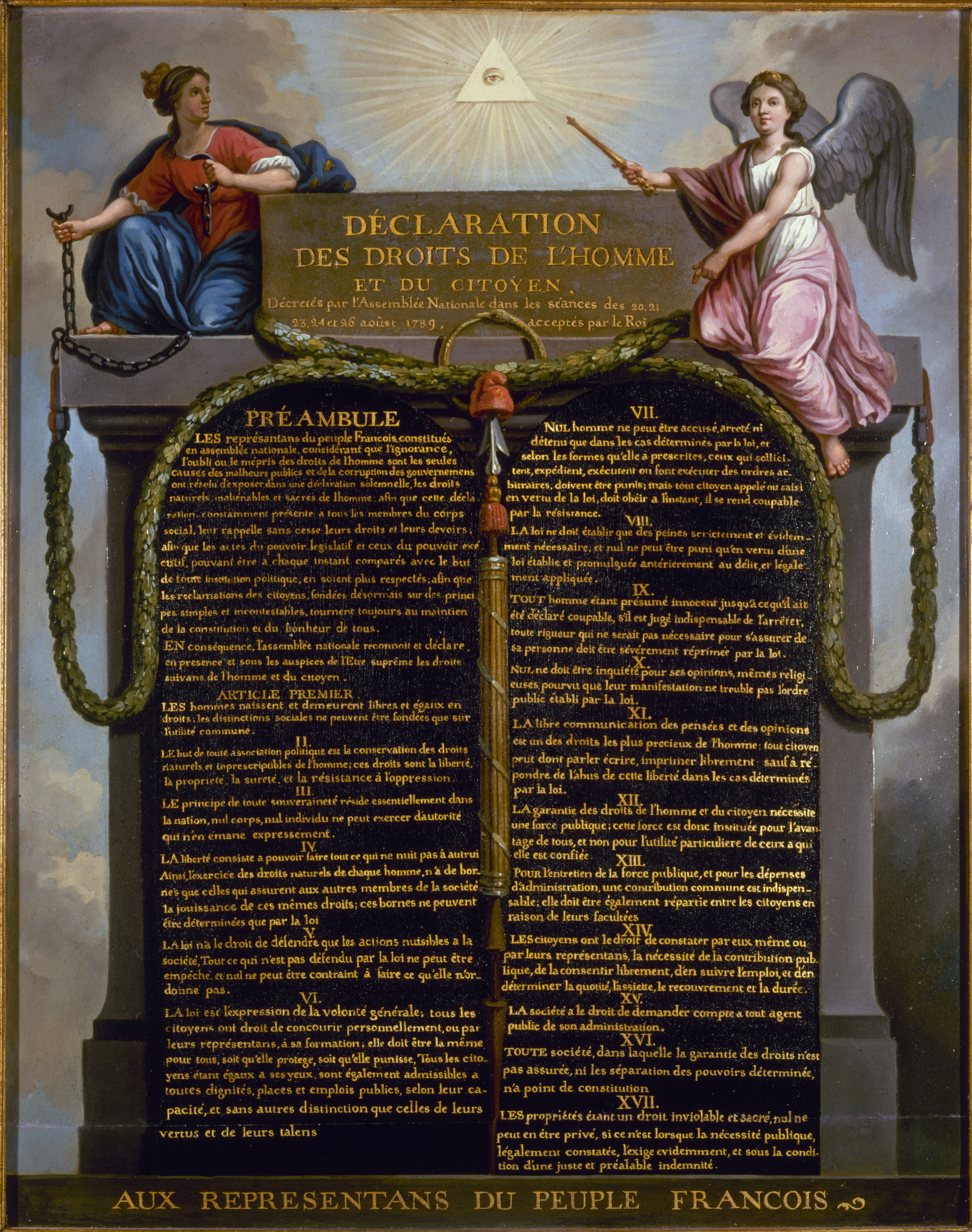
The basic principles that the French Republic must respect are found in the 1789 Declaration of the Rights of Man and of the Citizen.

France uses a civil legal system, wherein law arises primarily from written statutes; judges are not to make law, but merely to interpret it (though the amount of judicial interpretation in certain areas makes it equivalent to case law in a common law system). Basic principles of the rule of law were laid in the Napoleonic Code (which was largely based on royal law codified under King Louis XIV). In agreement with the principles of the Declaration of the Rights of Man and of the Citizen, the law should only prohibit actions detrimental to society.

French law is divided into two principal areas: private law and public law. Private law includes, in particular, civil law and criminal law. Public law includes, in particular, administrative law and constitutional law. However, in practical terms, French law comprises three principal areas of law: civil law, criminal law, and administrative law. Criminal laws can only address the future and not the past (criminal ex post facto laws are prohibited). While administrative law is often a subcategory of civil law in many countries, it is completely separated in France and each body of law is headed by a specific supreme court: ordinary courts (which handle criminal and civil litigation) are headed by the Court of Cassation and administrative courts are headed by the Council of State. To be applicable, every law must be officially published in the Journal officiel de la République française.

=== Human rights ===
France does not recognise religious law as a motivation for the enactment of prohibitions; it has long abolished blasphemy laws and sodomy laws. However, "offences against public decency" or disturbing public order have been used to repress public expressions of homosexuality or street prostitution.

France generally has a positive reputation regarding LGBTQ rights. Since 1999, civil unions for homosexual couples have been permitted, and since 2013, same-sex marriage and LGBT adoption are legal. France has laws against racism and antisemitism, while the 1990 Gayssot Act prohibits Holocaust denial. In 2024, France became the first nation in the European Union to explicitly protect abortion in its constitution.

Freedom of religion is constitutionally guaranteed by the 1789 Declaration of the Rights of Man and of the Citizen. The 1905 French law on the Separation of the Churches and the State is the basis for laïcité (state secularism): the state does not formally recognise any religion, except in Alsace-Moselle, which continues to subsidise education and clergy of Catholicism, Lutheranism, Calvinism, and Judaism. Nonetheless, France does recognise religious associations. The Parliament has listed many religious movements as dangerous cults since 1995 and has banned wearing conspicuous religious symbols in schools since 2004. In 2010, it banned the wearing of face-covering Islamic veils in public; human rights groups such as Amnesty International and Human Rights Watch described the law as discriminatory towards Muslims. However, it is supported by most of the population.

== Economy ==
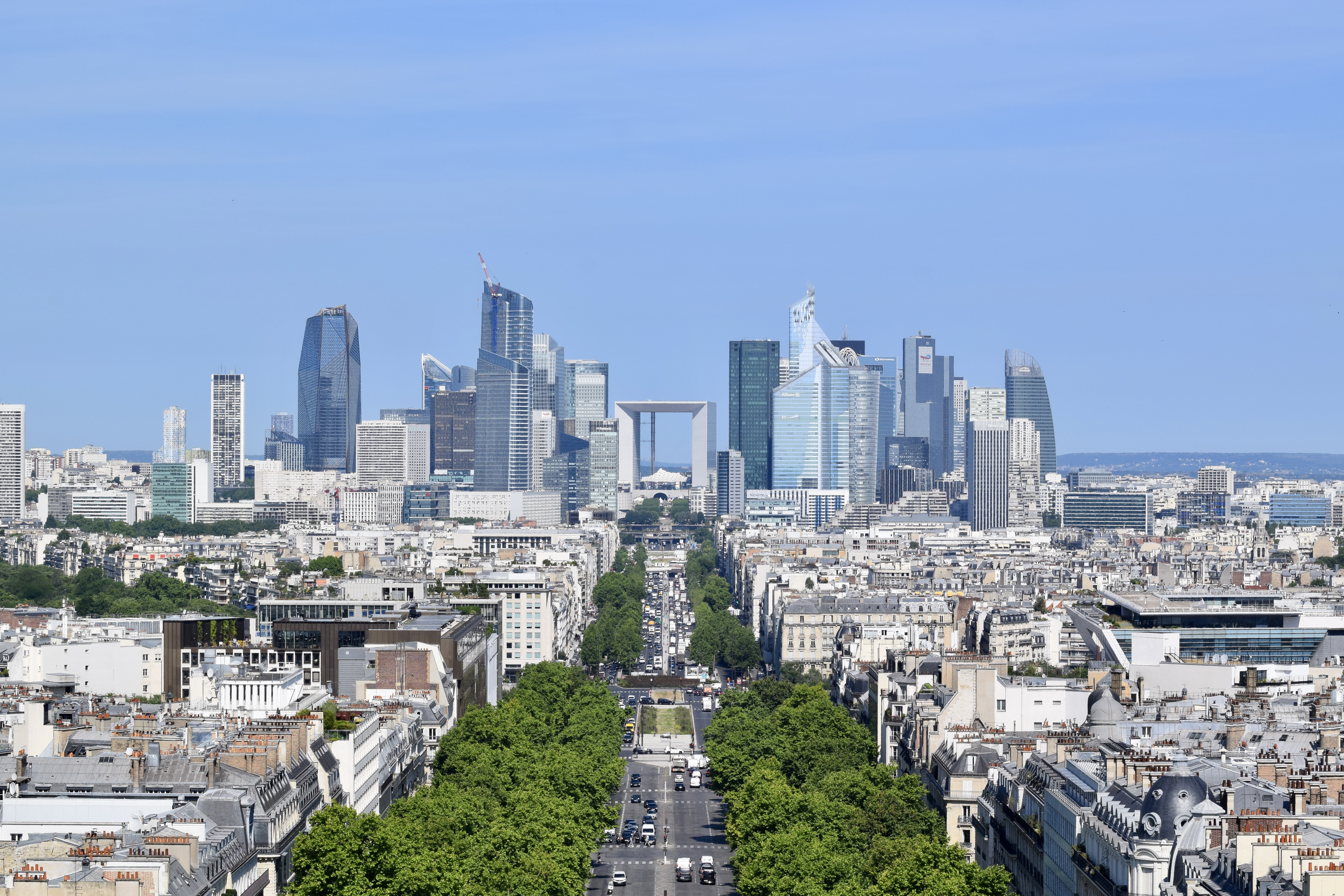
La Défense was in 2017 ranked by Ernst & Young as the leading central business district in continental Europe, and fourth in the world.

France has a social market economy characterised by sizeable government involvement and diversified sectors. For two centuries, it has consistently ranked among the ten largest globally; as of 2025 it is the world's ninth largest by purchasing power parity and second largest in the EU, after Germany. Considered a great power with considerable economic strength, it is a member of the Group of Seven leading industrialised countries, the Organisation for Economic Co-operation and Development (OECD), and the G20.

The economy is highly diversified; services represent two-thirds of both the workforce and GDP, while the industrial sector accounts for a fifth of GDP and a similar proportion of employment. France is the third-biggest manufacturing country in Europe, behind Germany and Italy, and ranks eighth in the world by manufacturing output, at 1.9 per cent. Less than 2 per cent of GDP is generated by the primary sector, namely agriculture; the agricultural sector is among the largest in value and leads the EU in overall production.

In 2018, France was the fifth-largest trading nation and second-largest in Europe, with the value of exports representing over a fifth of GDP. Its membership in the eurozone and the broader European single market facilitates access to capital, goods, services, and skilled labour. Despite protectionist policies over certain industries, particularly in agriculture, France has generally played a leading role in fostering free trade and commercial integration in Europe to enhance its economy. According to the Bank of France (founded in 1800), the leading recipients of foreign direct investment are manufacturing, real estate, finance and insurance. The Paris Region has the highest concentration of multinational firms in mainland Europe.

Under the doctrine of dirigisme, the government historically played a major role in the economy; policies such as indicative planning and nationalisation are credited for contributing to three decades of unprecedented postwar economic growth known as Trente Glorieuses. At its peak in 1982, the public sector accounted for one-fifth of industrial employment and over four-fifths of the credit market. Beginning in the late 20th century, regulations and state involvement in the economy were loosened, with most leading companies becoming privately owned; state ownership still dominates transportation, defence and broadcasting.

The Paris stock exchange is one of the oldest in the world, created in 1724. Some examples of the most valuable French companies include LVMH, L'Oréal and Sociéte Générale. France has historically been one of the world's major agricultural centres and remains a "global agricultural powerhouse"; France is the world's sixth-biggest exporter of agricultural products, generating a trade surplus of over €7.4 billion. Nicknamed "the granary of the old continent", over half its total land area is farmland, of which 45 per cent is devoted to permanent field crops such as cereals. The country's diverse climate, extensive arable land, modern farming technology, and EU subsidies have made it Europe's leading agricultural producer and exporter.

=== Tourism ===
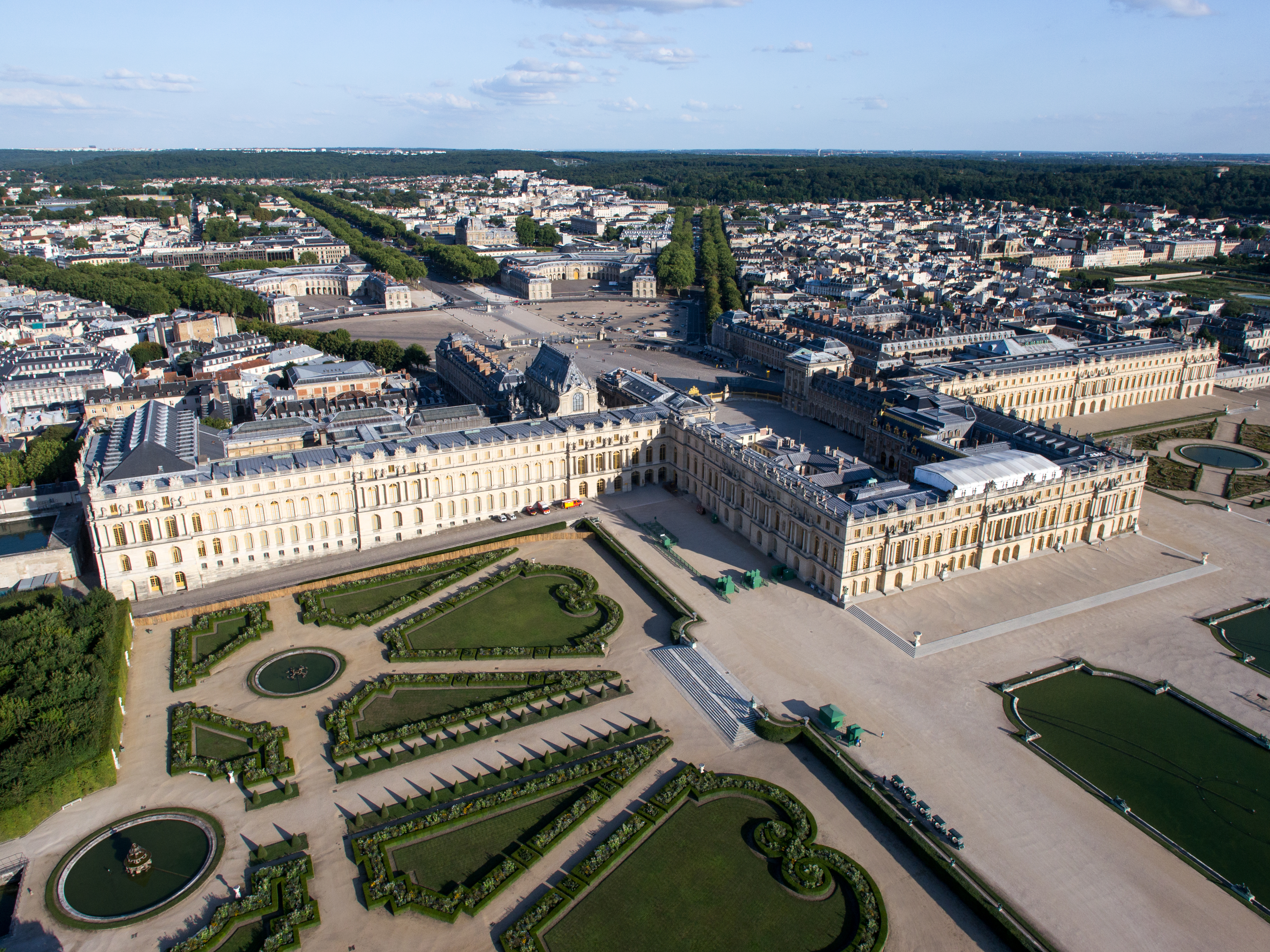
Palace of Versailles, Yvelines

With 59 million international tourist arrivals in 2025, France is the world's 4th tourist destination and ranks third in tourism-derived income. The most popular tourist sites include (annual visitors): Eiffel Tower (6.2 million), Château de Versailles (2.8 million), Muséum national d'Histoire naturelle (2 million), Pont du Gard (1.5 million), Arc de Triomphe (1.2 million), Mont Saint-Michel (1 million), Sainte-Chapelle (683,000), Château du Haut-Kœnigsbourg (549,000), Puy de Dôme (500,000), Musée Picasso (441,000), and Carcassonne (362,000).

France, especially Paris, has some of the world's largest museums including the Louvre, which is the most visited art museum in the world (7.7 million visitors in 2022); the Musée d'Orsay (3.3 million), mostly devoted to Impressionism and voted best museum in the world in 2018; the Musée de l'Orangerie (1.02 million), which is home to eight large Water Lily murals by Claude Monet; and the Centre Pompidou (3 million), dedicated to contemporary art.

Disneyland Paris is Europe's most popular theme park, with 15 million combined visitors to the resort's Disneyland Park and Walt Disney Studios Park in 2009. With more than 10 million tourists per year, the French Riviera is the second leading tourist destination in the country, after the Paris Region. With 6 million tourists per year, the castles of the Loire Valley (French: châteaux) and the Loire Valley are the third leading tourist destination.

France has 54 sites inscribed on the UNESCO World Heritage List, ranking it fourth worldwide by number of sites. France features cities of high cultural interest, beaches and seaside resorts, ski resorts, as well as rural regions that many enjoy for their beauty and tranquillity (green tourism). Small and picturesque villages are promoted through the association Les Plus Beaux Villages de France (literally "The Most Beautiful Villages of France"). The "Remarkable Gardens" label is a list of the over 200 gardens classified by the Ministry of Culture. This label is intended to protect and promote remarkable gardens and parks. France attracts many religious pilgrims on their way to St. James or to Lourdes, a town in the Hautes-Pyrénées that hosts several million visitors a year.

=== Energy ===
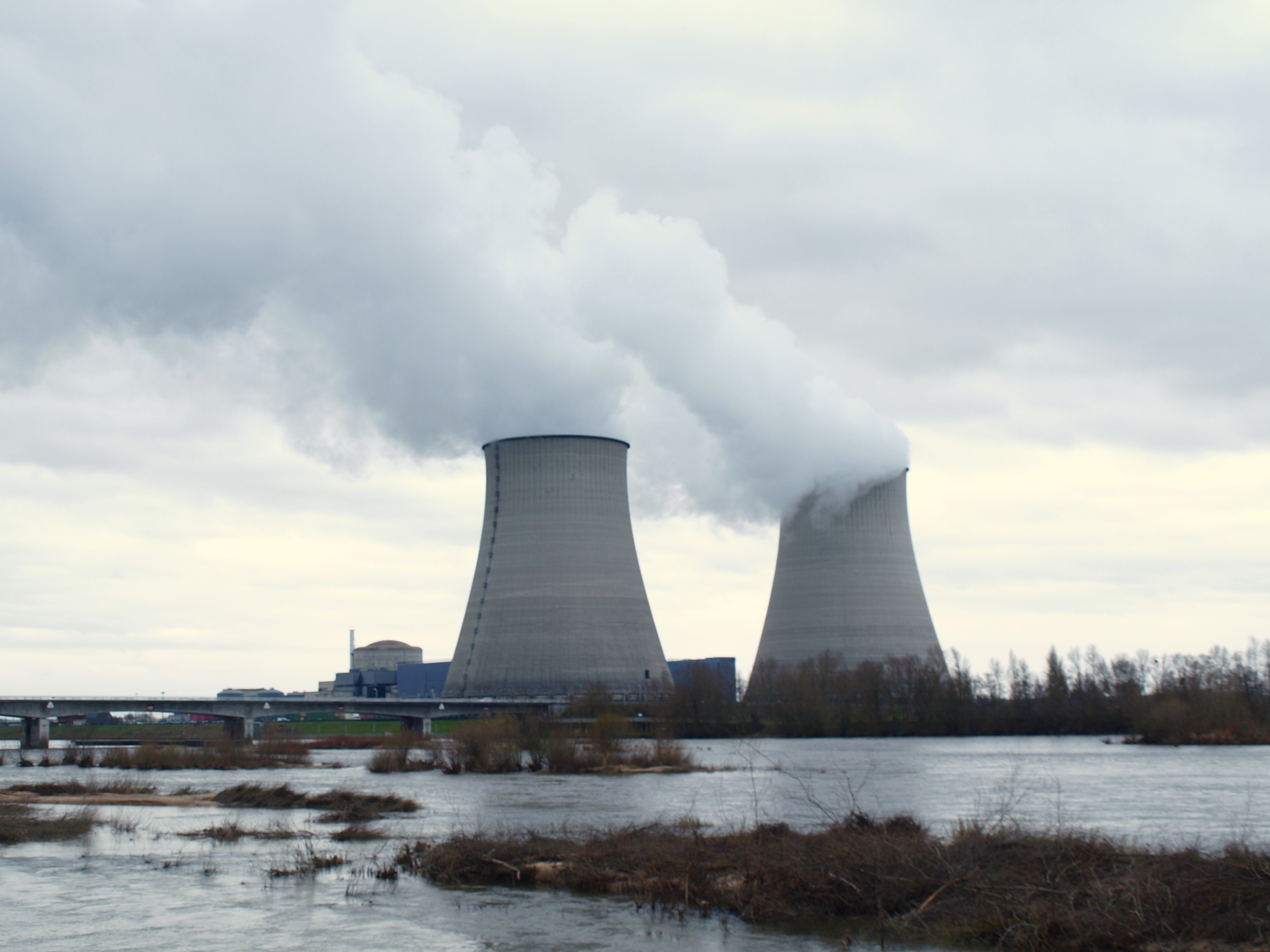
Belleville Nuclear Power Plant. France derives most of its electricity from nuclear power, the highest percentage in the world.

France is the world's tenth-largest producer of electricity. Électricité de France (EDF), which is majority-owned by the French government, is the country's main producer and distributor of electricity and one of the world's largest electric utility companies, ranking third in revenue globally. In 2018, EDF produced roughly one-fifth of the EU's electricity, primarily from nuclear power. In 2021, France was the biggest energy exporter in Europe, mostly to the UK and Italy, and the largest net exporter of electricity in the world.

Since the 1973 oil crisis, France has pursued a strong policy of energy security, namely through heavy investment in nuclear energy. It is one of 32 countries with nuclear power plants, ranking second in the world by the number of operational nuclear reactors at 56. Consequently, 70% of its electricity is generated by nuclear power, the highest proportion in the world by a wide margin; only Slovakia and Ukraine also derive a majority of electricity from nuclear power, at roughly 53% and 51%, respectively. France is considered a world leader in nuclear technology, with reactors and fuel products being major exports.

The significant reliance on nuclear power has resulted in comparatively slower adoption of renewable energy relative to other Western nations. Nevertheless, between 2008 and 2019, its production capacity from renewable energies rose consistently and nearly doubled. Hydropower is by far the leading source, accounting for over half of renewable energy sources and contributing 13% of its electricity the third highest proportion in Europe. Most hydroelectric plants, such as Eguzon, Étang de Soulcem, and Lac de Vouglans, are managed by EDF. France aims to further expand hydropower into 2040.

=== Transport ===
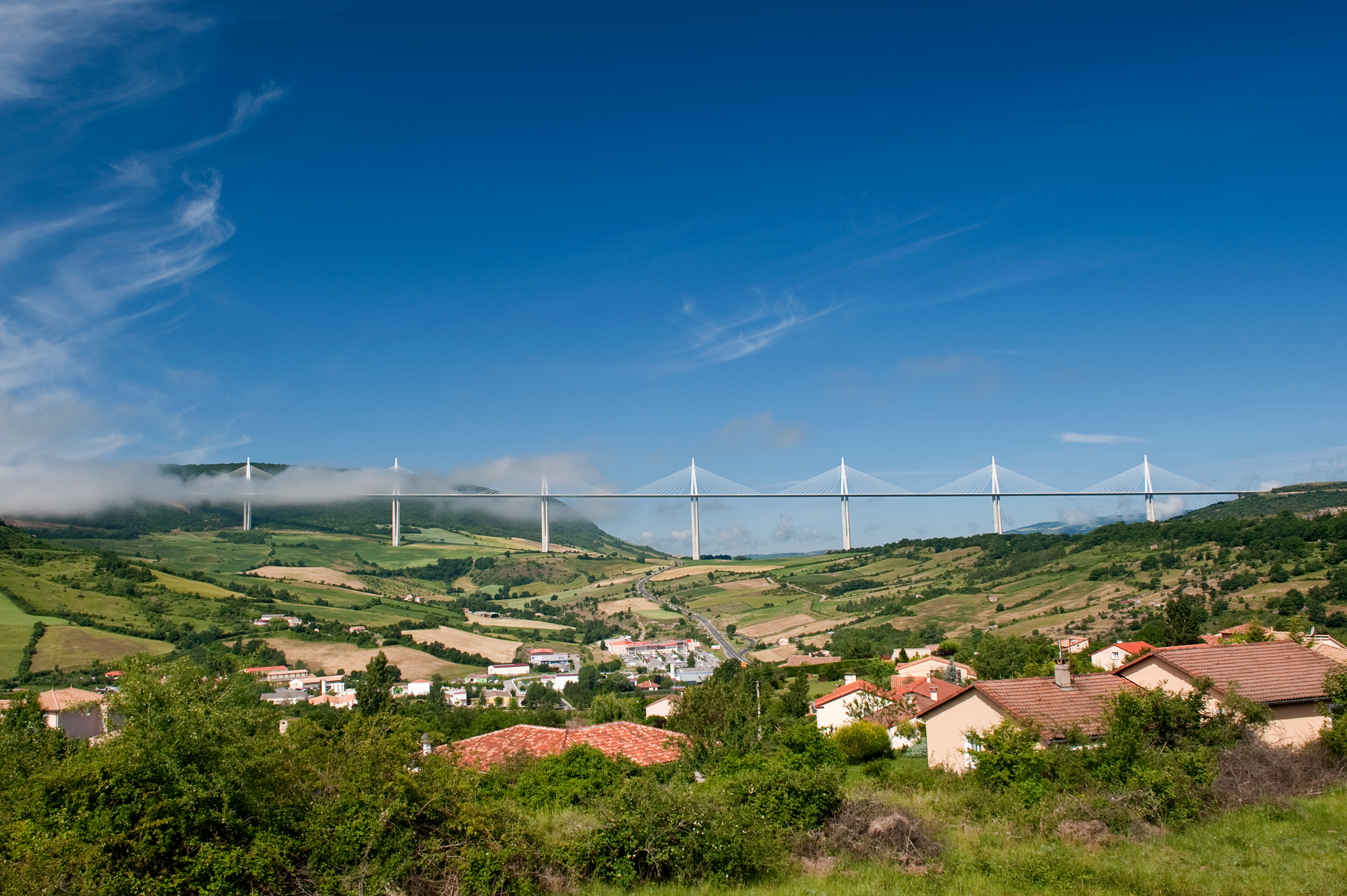
Millau Viaduct is the tallest bridge in the world.

The railway network in France stretches 29,473 kilometres (18,314 mi) as of 2008 and is the second most extensive in Western Europe after Germany's. It is operated by the SNCF, and high-speed trains include Thalys, Eurostar and TGV, which travels at 320 km/h (199 mph). Eurostar and LeShuttle connect with the United Kingdom through the Channel Tunnel. Rail connections exist to all other neighbouring countries in Europe except Andorra. Intra-urban connections are also well developed, with most major cities having underground or tramway services complementing bus services.

There are approximately 1,027,183 kilometres (638,262 mi) of serviceable roadway, ranking it the most extensive network of the European continent. The Paris Region is enveloped with a dense network of roads and highways, which connect it with virtually all parts of the country. Roads also handle substantial international traffic, connecting with cities in neighbouring countries. There is no annual registration fee or road tax; usage of the mostly privately owned motorways is through tolls except in the vicinity of large communes. The new car market is dominated by domestic brands such as Renault, Peugeot and Citroën. France possesses the Millau Viaduct, the world's tallest bridge, and has built many important bridges such as the Pont de Normandie. Diesel and petrol-driven cars and lorries cause a large part of the country's air pollution and greenhouse gas emissions.

There are 464 airports in France. Charles de Gaulle Airport, located in the vicinity of Paris, is the largest and busiest airport in the country, handling the vast majority of popular and commercial traffic and connecting Paris with virtually all major cities across the world. Air France is the national carrier airline, although numerous private airline companies provide domestic and international travel services. There are ten major ports, the largest of which is in Marseille, which also is the largest bordering the Mediterranean Sea. 12,261 kilometres (7,619 mi) of waterways traverse France including the Canal du Midi, which connects the Mediterranean Sea to the Atlantic Ocean through the Garonne river.

== Demographics ==
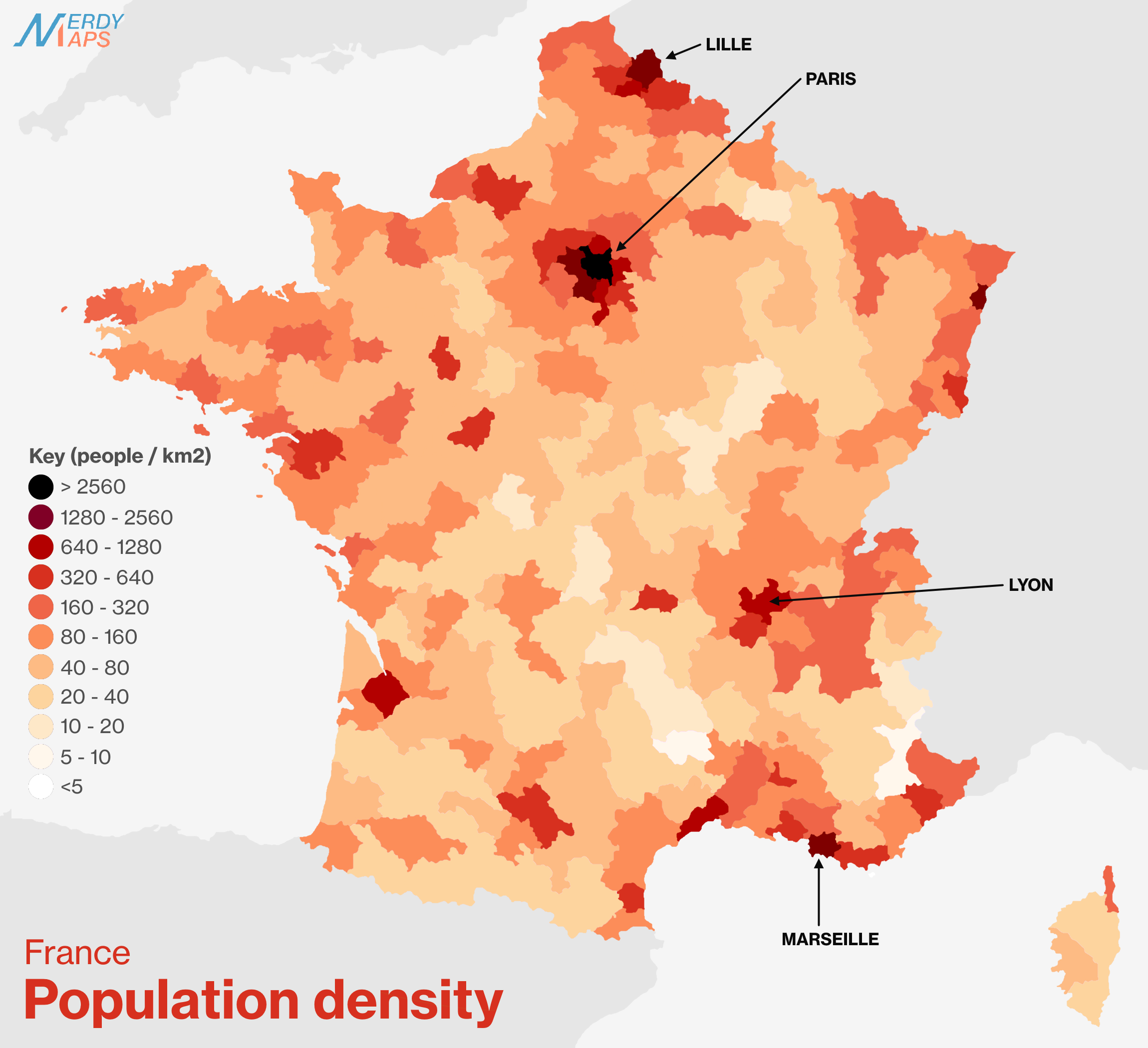
Population density in France by arrondissement

With an estimated population of 69,081,996 people, (Note: As of January 2026) France is the 20th most populous country in the world, the third-most populous in Europe, and the second most populous in the European Union. For much of the 21st century, France has been an outlier among developed countries, particularly in Europe, for its relatively high rate of natural population growth; by birth rates alone, it was responsible for almost all natural population growth in the EU in 2006. Between 2006 and 2016, France saw the second-highest overall increase in population in the EU and was one of four EU countries where natural births accounted for the most population growth. This was the highest rate since the end of the baby boom in 1973 and coincides with the rise in the total fertility rate from a nadir of 1.7 in 1994 to 2.0 in 2010.

Since 2011, the fertility rate has been steadily declining; it stood at 1.79 per woman in 2023, below the replacement rate of 2.1 and well below the high of 4.41 in 1800. Fertility rate and crude birth rate nonetheless remain the highest in the EU and among the highest in Europe overall, where the average is 1.5. The mean age of French women at the birth of their first child was 29.1, slightly younger than the EU average of 29.7.

Like many developed nations, the population is aging: The average age is 41.7 years, while roughly one-fifth of French people are 65 or over. It is projected that one in three French will be over 60 by 2024. Life expectancy at birth is 82.7 years, the 12th highest in the world; French Polynesia and Réunion ranked fourth and 11th in life expectancy, at 84.07 years and 83.55, respectively.

From 2006 to 2011, population growth averaged 0.6 percent per year; since 2011, annual growth has been between 0.4 and 0.5 percent annually, and France is projected to continue growing until 2044. Immigrants are major contributors to this trend; in 2010, roughly one in four newborns (27 percent) in Metropolitan France had at least one foreign-born parent, and another 24 percent had at least one parent born outside Europe (excluding French overseas territories). In 2021, the share of children of foreign-born mothers was 23 percent.

The fertility rate in France dropped to 1.56 in 2025. This was the lowest rate since the end of the first world war.

=== Major cities ===
France is a highly urbanised country, with its largest cities (in terms of metropolitan area population in 2023) being Paris (13,320,752 inh.), Lyon (2,339,329), Marseille (1,917,728), Lille (1,530,624), Toulouse (1,529,112), Bordeaux (1,426,278), Nantes (1,050,815), Strasbourg (875,163), Montpellier (842,923), and Rennes (789,516). (Note: since its 2020 revision of metropolitan area borders, INSEE considers that Nice is a metropolitan area separate from the Cannes-Antibes metropolitan area; these two combined would have a population of 1,045,839, as of the 2023 census). Rural flight was a perennial political issue throughout most of the 20th century.

Largest metropolitan areas in France 2023 census
Rank	Name	Region	Pop.	Rank	Name	Region	Pop.
1	Paris	Île-de-France	13,320,752	11	Grenoble	Auvergne-Rhône-Alpes	727,380
2	Lyon	Auvergne-Rhône-Alpes	2,339,329	12	Rouen	Normandy	715,234
3	Marseille	Provence-Alpes-Côte d'Azur	1,917,728	13	Nice	Provence-Alpes-Côte d'Azur	641,721
4	Lille	Hauts-de-France	1,530,624	14	Toulon	Provence-Alpes-Côte d'Azur	591,135
5	Toulouse	Occitania	1,529,112	15	Tours	Centre-Val de Loire	529,468
6	Bordeaux	Nouvelle-Aquitaine	1,426,278	16	Clermont-Ferrand	Auvergne-Rhône-Alpes	510,668
7	Nantes	Pays de la Loire	1,050,815	17	Nancy	Grand Est	507,812
8	Strasbourg	Grand Est	875,163	18	Saint-Étienne	Auvergne-Rhône-Alpes	503,351
9	Montpellier	Occitania	842,923	19	Caen	Normandy	486,716
10	Rennes	Brittany	789,516	20	Orléans	Centre-Val de Loire	463,435

=== Ethnic groups ===
Historically, French people were mainly of Celtic-Gallic origin, with a significant admixture of Italic (Romans) and Germanic (Franks) groups reflecting centuries of respective migration and settlement. Through the course of the Middle Ages, France incorporated various neighbouring ethnic and linguistic groups, as evidenced by Breton elements in the west, Aquitanian in the southwest, Scandinavian in the northwest, Alemannic in the northeast, and Ligurian in the southeast.

Large-scale immigration over the last century and a half have led to a more multicultural society; beginning with the French Revolution and further codified in the French Constitution of 1958, the government is prohibited from collecting data on ethnicity and ancestry; most demographic information is drawn from private sector organisations or academic institutions. In 2004 the Institut Montaigne estimated that within Metropolitan France, 51 million people were white (85% of the population), 6 million were northwest African (10%), 2 million were black (3.3%), and 1 million were Asian (1.7%).

A 2008 poll conducted jointly by the Institut national d'études démographiques (INSEE) and the French National Institute of Statistics estimated that the largest minority ancestry groups were Italian (5 million), followed by northwest African (3–6 million), Sub-Saharan African (2.5 million), Armenian (500,000), and Turkish (200,000). There are also sizeable minorities of other European ethnic groups, namely Spanish, Portuguese, Polish, and Greek. France has a significant Gitan (Romani) population, numbering between 20,000 and 400,000; many foreign Roma are expelled back to Bulgaria and Romania frequently.

=== Immigration ===
It is estimated that 40% of the French population is descended at least partially from the different waves of immigration since the early 20th century; between 1921 and 1935 alone, about 1.1 million net immigrants came to France. The next largest wave came in the 1960s when around 1.6 million pieds-noirs returned to France following the independence of its northwest African possessions of Algeria and Morocco. They were joined by numerous former colonial subjects from North and West Africa, as well as numerous European immigrants from Spain and Portugal.

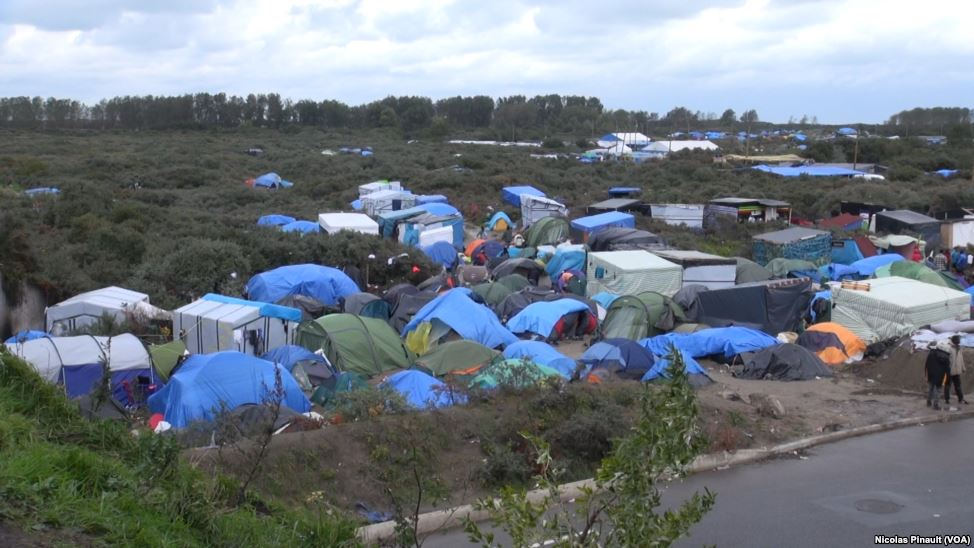
The Calais Jungle was a refugee and illegal migrant encampment in the vicinity of Calais, France, that existed from January 2015 to October 2016.

France remains a major destination for immigrants, accepting about 200,000 legal immigrants annually. In 2005, it was Western Europe's leading recipient of asylum seekers, with an estimated 50,000 applications (albeit a 15% decrease from 2004). In 2010, France received about 48,100 asylum applications—placing it among the top five asylum recipients in the world. In subsequent years it saw the number of applications increase, ultimately doubling to 100,412 in 2017. The European Union allows free movement between the member states, although France established controls to curb Eastern European migration. Foreigners' rights are established in the Code of Entry and Residence of Foreigners and of the Right to Asylum. Immigration remains a contentious political issue.

In 2008 INSEE estimated that the number of foreign-born immigrants was around 5 million (8% of the population), while their French-born descendants numbered 6.5 million, or 11% of the population. Thus, nearly a fifth of the country's population were either first or second-generation immigrants, of which more than 5 million were of European origin and 4 million of Maghrebi ancestry. In 2008, France granted citizenship to 137,000 persons, mostly from Morocco, Algeria and Turkey. In 2022, more than 320,000 migrants came to France, with the majority coming from Africa.

In 2014, the INSEE reported a significant increase in the number of immigrants coming from Spain, Portugal and Italy between 2009 and 2012. According to the institute, this increase resulted from the 2008 financial crisis. Statistics on Spanish immigrants in France show a growth of 107 per cent between 2009 and 2012, with the population growing from 5,300 to 11,000. Of the total of 229,000 foreigners coming to France in 2012, nearly 8% were Portuguese, 5% British, 5% Spanish, 4% Italian, 4% German, 3% Romanian, and 3% Belgian.

=== Language ===
Map of the Francophone world: Native language Administrative language Secondary or cultural language

The official language is French, a Romance language derived from Latin. Since 1635, the Académie Française has been the official authority on the French language, although its recommendations carry no legal weight. There are also regional languages spoken in France, such as Occitan, Breton, Catalan, Flemish (Dutch dialect), Alsatian (German dialect), Basque, and Corsican (Italian dialect). Italian was the official language of Corsica up to 1859. Although regional languages do not have the status of official languages, they are recognised by Article 75-1 of the constitution as part of France's heritage.

The government does not regulate the choice of language in publications by individuals, but the use of French is required by law in commercial and workplace communications. The French government tries to promote French in the EU and globally through institutions such as the Organisation internationale de la Francophonie. There are 77 vernacular minority languages, eight spoken in Metropolitan France and 69 in the overseas territories.

According to the 2007 Adult Education Survey, part of a project by the European Union and carried out in France by INSEE and based on a sample of 15,350 persons, French was the native language of 87% of the population, or roughly 56 million people, followed by Arabic (3.6%, 2.3 million), Portuguese (1.5%, 960,000), Spanish (1.2%, 770,000) and Italian (1.0%, 640,000).

=== Religion ===
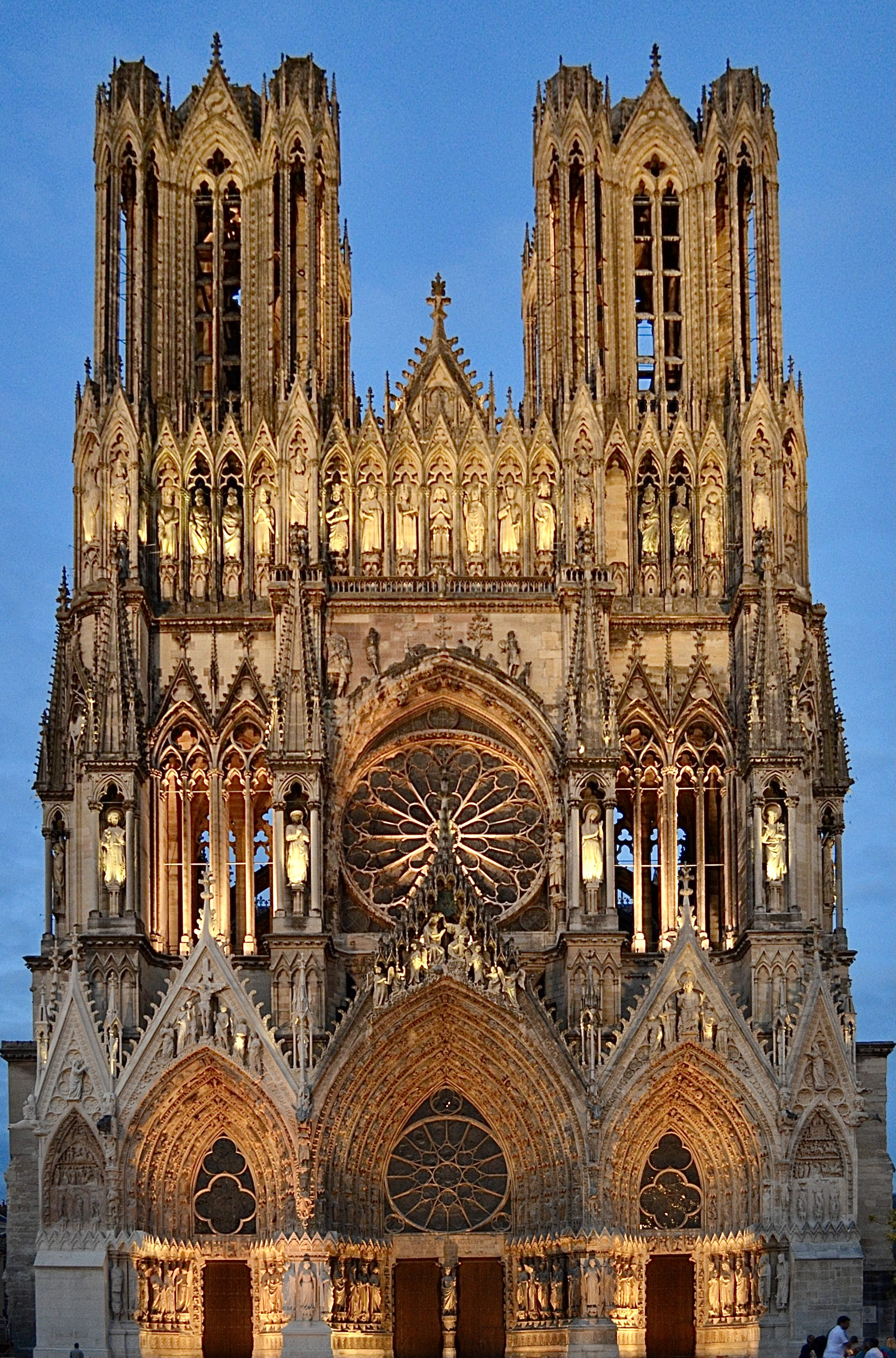
Notre-Dame de Reims is the Catholic cathedral where the Kings of France were crowned until 1825. (Note: The last sacre was that of Charles X on 29 May 1825.)

France is a secular country in which freedom of religion is a constitutional right. After alternating between royal and secular republican governments during the 19th century, the 1905 law on the Separation of the Churches and the State established the concept of laïcité, a strict separation of church and state under which the government and public life are kept completely secular, detached from any religion. Alsace and Moselle, which were part of the German Empire when state secularism was established in France, is an exception since the local law stipulates official status and state funding for Lutheranism, Catholicism, and Judaism.

Catholicism has been the main religion in France for more than a millennium, and it was once the state religion. Its role nowadays has been greatly reduced; nevertheless in 2012, among the 47,000 religious buildings in France, 94% were Catholic churches. The government is prohibited from recognising specific rights to any religious community (with the exception of legacy statutes like those of military chaplains and the aforementioned local law in Alsace-Moselle). It recognises religious organisations according to formal legal criteria that do not address religious doctrine, and religious organisations are expected to refrain from intervening in policymaking. Some religious groups, such as scientology, the Children of God, the Unification Church, and the Order of the Solar Temple, are considered cults (sectes in French) and are not granted the same status as recognised religions.

=== Health ===
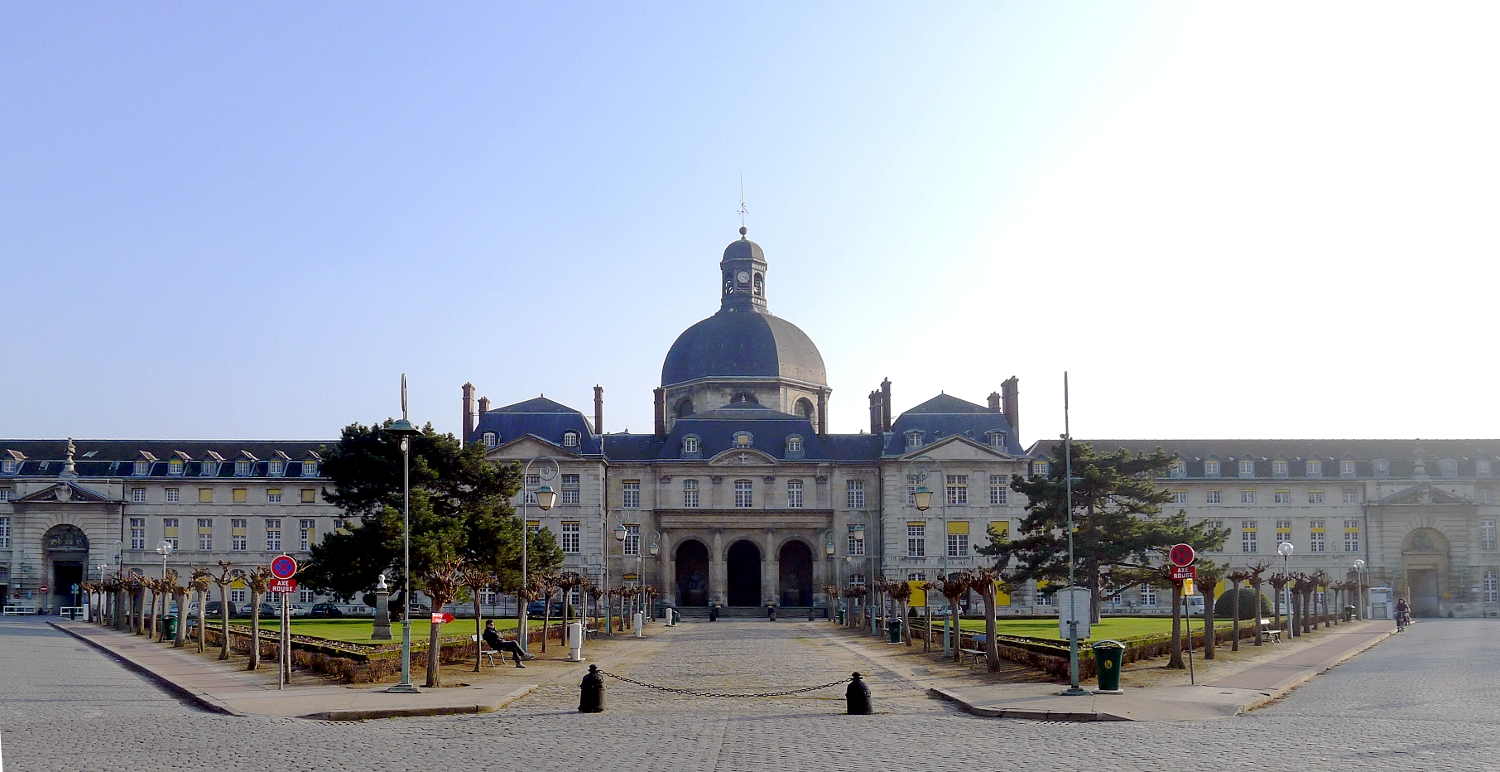
The Pitié-Salpêtrière Hospital, a teaching hospital in Paris, is one of Europe's largest hospitals.

The French health care system is one of universal health care largely financed by government national health insurance. In its 2000 assessment of world health care systems, the World Health Organization (WHO) found that France provided the "close to best overall health care" in the world. The French health care system was ranked first worldwide by the WHO in 1997. In 2011, France spent 11.6% of its GDP on health care, or US$4,086 per capita, a figure much higher than the average spent by countries in Europe. Approximately 77% of health expenditures are covered by government-funded agencies.

Care is generally free for people affected by chronic diseases such as cancer, AIDS or cystic fibrosis. The life expectancy at birth is 80 years for men and 85.6 years for women. There are 3.2 physicians for every 1000 inhabitants, 5.7 hospital beds for every 1000 inhabitants, and average health care spending per capita was US$8,630 in 2022, representing 12.1% of GDP. As of 2007, approximately 140,000 inhabitants (0.4%) are living with HIV/AIDS.

=== Education ===
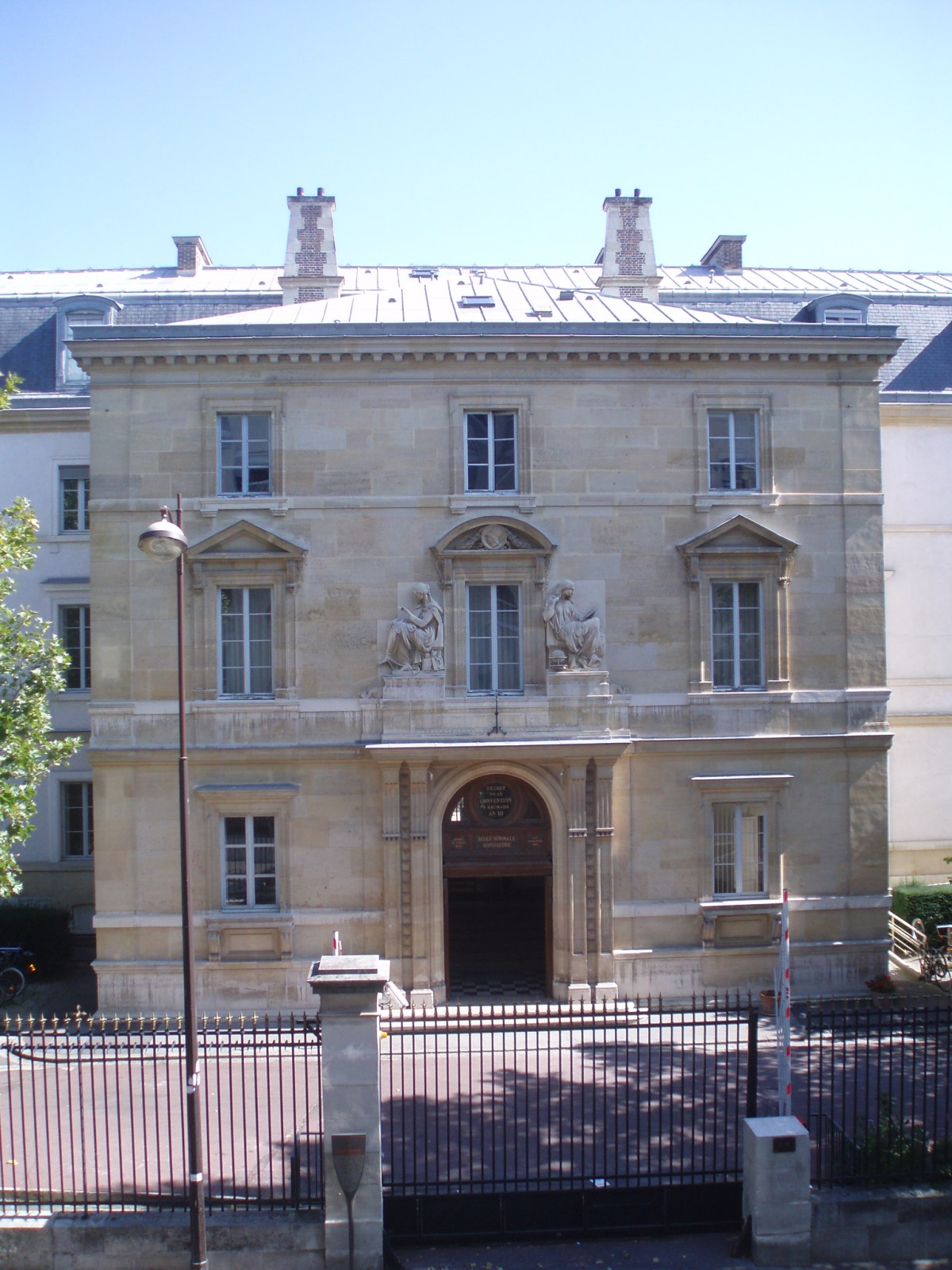
The ENS produces among the most Nobel Prize laureates per capita in the world.

In 1802, Napoleon created the lycée, the second and final stage of secondary education that prepares students for higher education studies or a profession. Jules Ferry is considered the father of the French modern school, leading reforms in the late 19th century that established free, secular and compulsory education (currently mandatory to age 16).

French education is centralised and divided into three stages: primary, secondary, and higher education. The Programme for International Student Assessment, coordinated by the OECD, ranked France's education as near the OECD average in 2018. School children in France reported greater concern about the disciplinary climate and behaviour in classrooms compared to other OECD countries.

Higher education is divided between public universities and the prestigious and selective Grandes écoles, such as Sciences Po Paris for political studies, HEC Paris for economics, Polytechnique, the École des hautes études en sciences sociales for social studies and the École nationale supérieure des mines de Paris that produce high-profile engineers, or the École nationale d'administration for careers in the Grands Corps of the state. The Grandes écoles have been criticised for alleged elitism, producing many if not most of France's high-ranking civil servants, CEOs and politicians.

France also supports a network of schools internationally through the Agency for French Education Abroad. The network includes a mix of directly managed schools, subsidized institutions, and partner schools, and provides French education to students around the world.

== Culture ==
=== Art ===
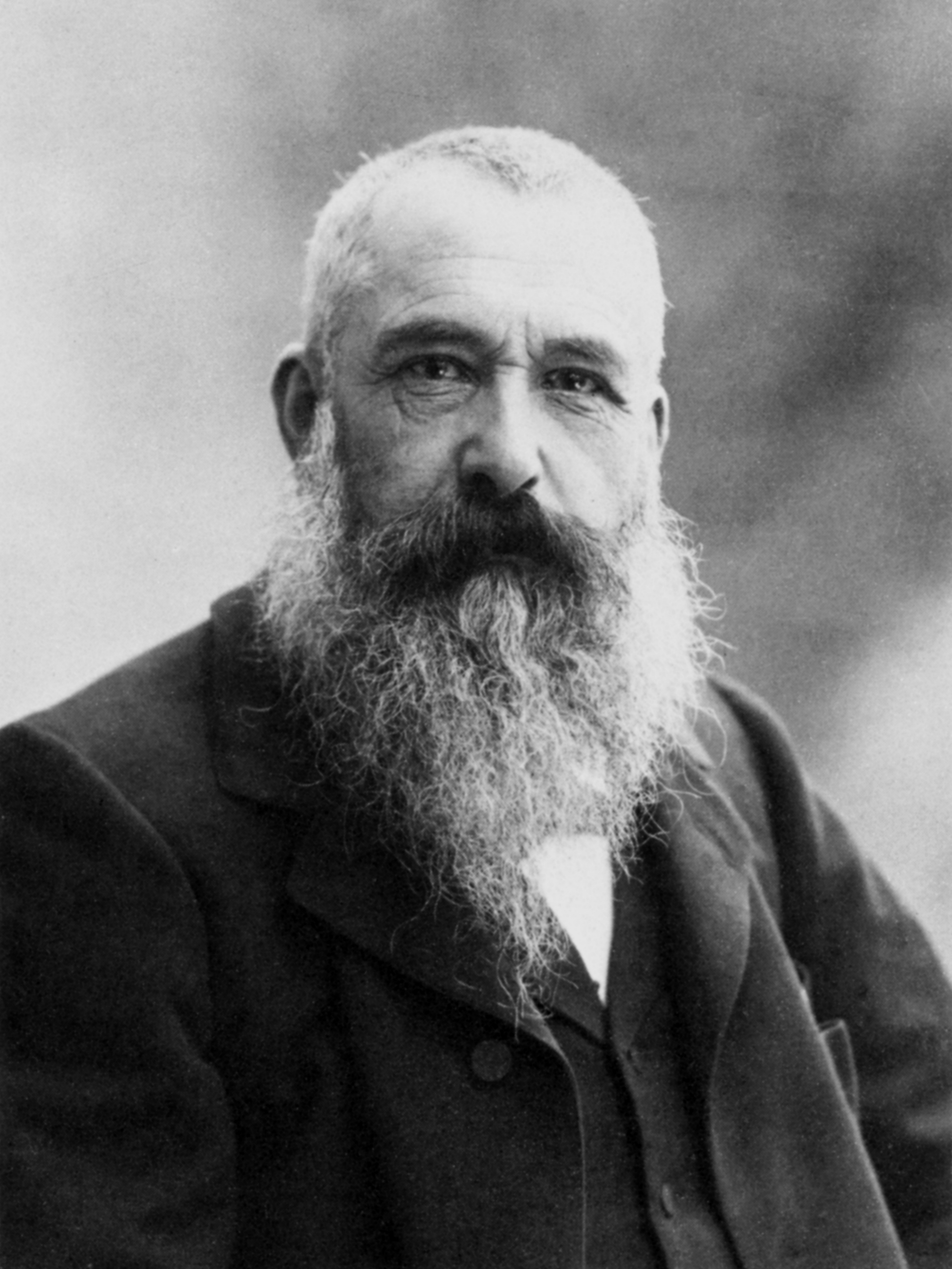
Claude Monet, founder of the Impressionist movement

The origins of a distinctly French art date back to the Middle Ages. In the 12th century, Paris and its region saw the birth of Gothic art, known at the time as Opus Francigenum (lit. 'French work'), which from the cathedrals of Chartres, Amiens and Reims soon radiated throughout Europe, thanks to French architects and sculptors who went abroad.

French art was very much influenced first by Flemish art then by Italian art at the time of the Renaissance. Jean Fouquet, the most famous medieval French painter, is said to have been the first to travel to Italy and experience the Early Renaissance firsthand. The Renaissance painting School of Fontainebleau was directly inspired by Italian painters such as Primaticcio and Rosso Fiorentino, who both worked in France. Two of the most famous French artists of the time of the Baroque era, Nicolas Poussin and Claude Lorrain, lived in Italy. But 17th-century French art quickly moved towards classicism under Louis XIV, with artists like painter Charles Le Brun, architect Louis Le Vau, garden and landscape architect André Le Nôtre and cabinetmaker André-Charles Boulle who all worked at the construction of the Palace of Versailles establishing the fashionable Louis XIV style at a time when France was becoming a cultural reference point for all of Europe.

French artists developed the rococo style in the early 18th century, as a more intimate evolution of the Baroque style, the works of the court-endorsed artists Antoine Watteau, François Boucher and Jean-Honoré Fragonard being the most representative in the country. The French Revolution brought great changes, as Napoleon favoured artists of neoclassic style such as Jacques-Louis David and the highly influential Académie des Beaux-Arts defined the style known as Academism.

In the second part of the 19th century, France's influence over painting grew, with the development of new styles of painting such as Impressionism and Symbolism. The most famous impressionist painters of the period were Camille Pissarro, Édouard Manet, Edgar Degas, Claude Monet and Auguste Renoir. The second generation of impressionist-style painters, Paul Cézanne, Paul Gauguin, Toulouse-Lautrec and Georges Seurat, were also at the avant-garde of artistic evolutions, as well as the fauvist artists Henri Matisse, André Derain and Maurice de Vlaminck.

At the beginning of the 20th century, Cubism was developed by Georges Braque and the Spanish painter Pablo Picasso, who was living in Paris. Other foreign artists also settled and worked in or near Paris, such as Vincent van Gogh and Wassily Kandinsky. In the early 20th century and in particular during the interwar period, a loose collection of foreign artists of whom many were Jewish formed the School of Paris. Amongst these artists were Marc Chagall, Amedeo Modigliani, Yitzhak Frenel, Jules Pascin and others. The Second World War led to the deaths or exile of multiple artists, resulting in the relative fall of Paris' domination and centrality in the world art scene in favour of New York City.

=== Architecture ===
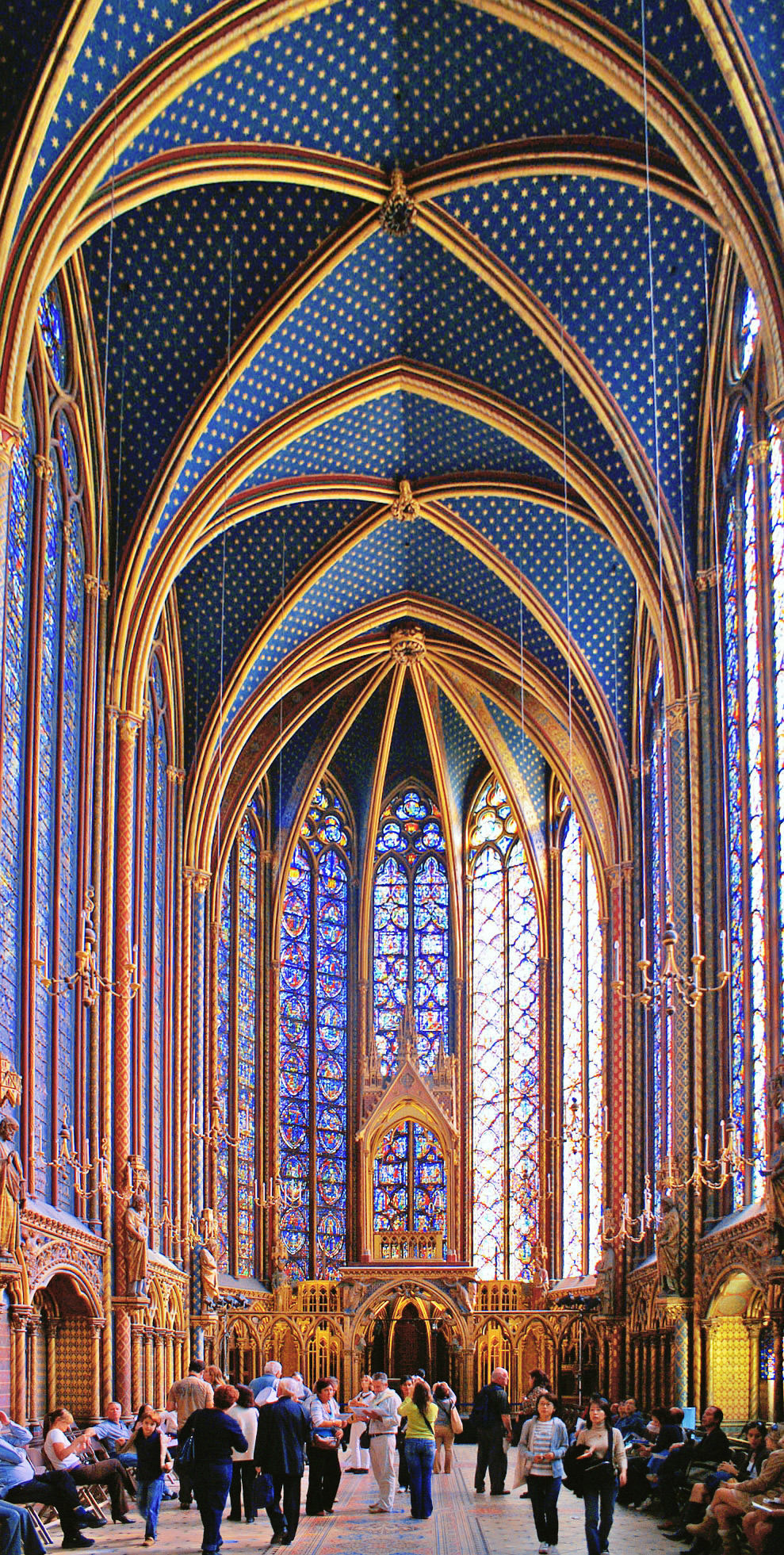
Saint Louis' Sainte-Chapelle represents the French impact on religious architecture.

During the Middle Ages, many fortified castles were built by feudal nobles to mark their powers. Some French castles that survive are Chinon, Château d'Angers, Château de Vincennes and the Cathar castles. During this era, France had been using Romanesque architecture like most of Western Europe.

Gothic architecture, originally named Opus Francigenum meaning "French work", was born in Île-de-France and was the first French style of architecture to be imitated throughout Europe. Northern France is the home of some of the most important Gothic cathedrals and basilicas, the first of these being the Saint Denis Basilica (used as the royal necropolis); other important French Gothic cathedrals are Notre-Dame de Chartres and Notre-Dame d'Amiens. The kings were crowned in another important Gothic church: Notre-Dame de Reims.

The final victory in the Hundred Years' War marked an important stage in the evolution of French architecture. It was the time of the French Renaissance and several artists from Italy were invited to the French court; many residential palaces were built in the Loire Valley, from 1450 as a first reference the Château de Montsoreau. Examples of such residential castles include the Château de Chambord, the Château de Chenonceau, or the Château d'Amboise.

Following the Renaissance and the end of the Middle Ages, Baroque architecture replaced the traditional Gothic style. Baroque architecture found greater success in the secular domain than in the religious one. In the secular domain, the Palace of Versailles has many Baroque features. Jules Hardouin-Mansart, who designed the extensions to Versailles, was one of the most influential French architects of the Baroque era; he is famous for his dome at Les Invalides. Impressive provincial Baroque architecture is found in places that were not yet French, such as Place Stanislas in Nancy. On the military architectural side, Vauban designed some of the most efficient fortresses in Europe and became an influential military architect; as a result, imitations of his works can be found all over Europe, the Americas, Russia and Turkey.

After the Revolution, the Republicans favoured Neoclassicism although it was introduced in France before the revolution with such buildings as the Parisian Pantheon or the Capitole de Toulouse. Built during the French First Empire, the Arc de Triomphe and Sainte Marie-Madeleine represent the best example of Empire style architecture. Under Napoleon III, a wave of urbanism and architecture was given birth; extravagant buildings such as the neo-Baroque Palais Garnier were built. The urban planning of the time was very organised and rigorous; most notably, Haussmann's renovation of Paris. The architecture associated with this era is named Second Empire in English, the term being taken from the Second French Empire. At this time there was a strong Gothic resurgence across Europe and in France; the associated architect was Eugène Viollet-le-Duc. In the late 19th century, Gustave Eiffel designed many bridges, such as the Garabit viaduct, and remains one of the most influential bridge designers of his time, although he is best remembered for the Eiffel Tower.

In the 20th century, French-Swiss architect Le Corbusier designed several buildings in France. More recently, French architects have combined both modern and old architectural styles. The Louvre Pyramid is an example of modern architecture added to an older building. The most difficult buildings to integrate within French cities are skyscrapers, as they are visible from afar. For instance, in Paris since 1977, new buildings had to be under 37 metres (121 ft). A significant number of skyscrapers are located in the La Défense financial district. Other massive buildings that are a challenge to integrate into their environment are large bridges; an example of the way this has been done is the Millau Viaduct. Some famous modern French architects include Jean Nouvel, Dominique Perrault, Christian de Portzamparc and Paul Andreu.

=== Literature and philosophy ===
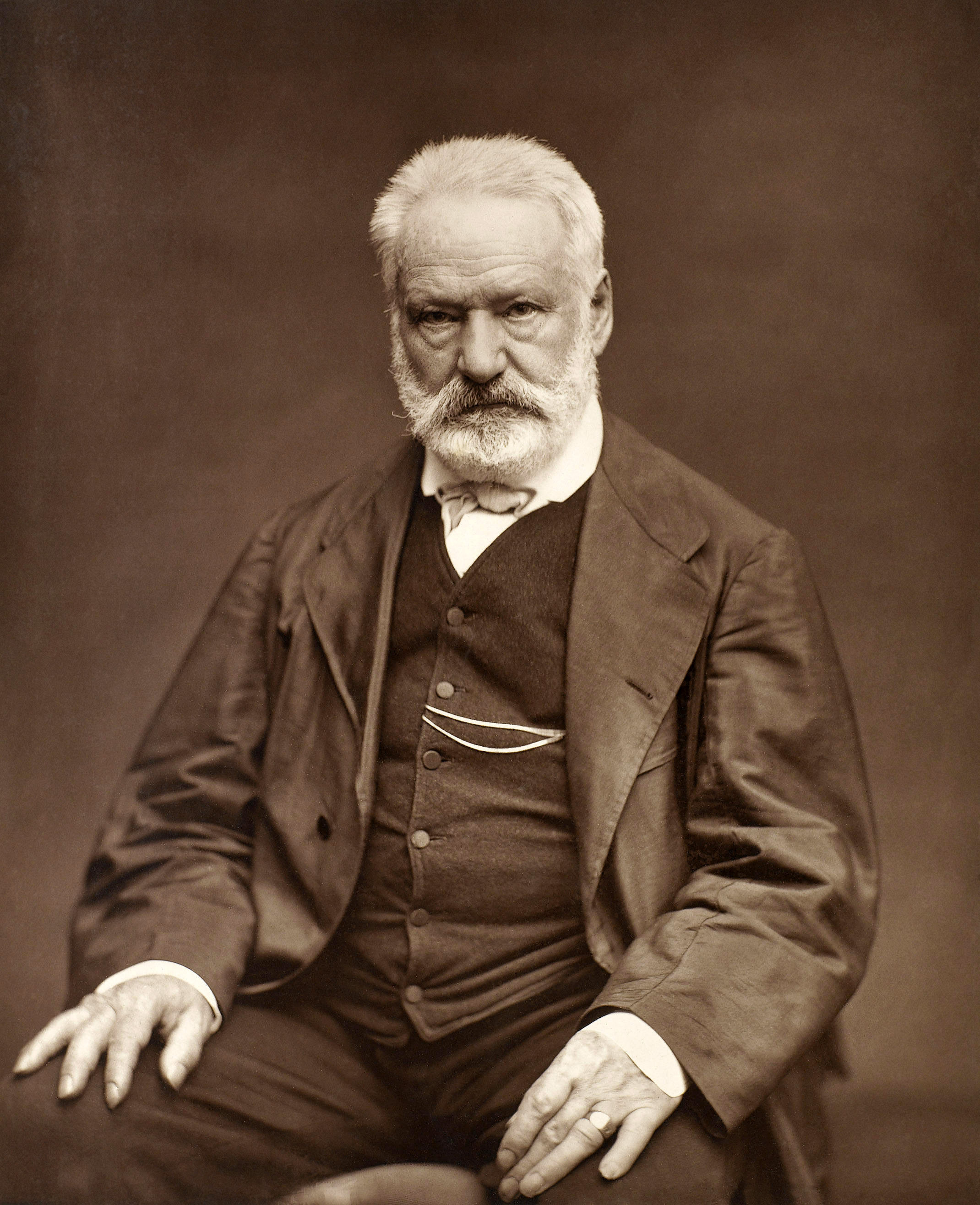
Victor Hugo, a French Romantic writer and politician

The earliest French literature dates from the Middle Ages, when there were several languages and dialects, and writers used their own spelling and grammar. Some authors of medieval texts, such as Tristan and Iseult and Lancelot-Grail, are unknown. Three famous medieval authors are Chrétien de Troyes, Christine de Pizan (langue d'oïl), and Duke William IX of Aquitaine (langue d'oc). Much medieval French poetry and literature was inspired by the legends of the Carolingian cycle, such as the Song of Roland and the chansons de geste. The Roman de Renart, written in 1175 by Perrout de Saint Cloude, tells the story of the medieval character Reynard ('the Fox') and is another example of early French writing. An important 16th-century writer was François Rabelais, who wrote five popular early picaresque novels. Rabelais was also in regular communication with Marguerite de Navarre, author of the Heptaméron. Michel de Montaigne's most famous work, Essais, started a literary genre.

French literature and poetry flourished during the 18th and 19th centuries. Denis Diderot is best known as the main editor of the Encyclopédie, whose aim was to sum up all the knowledge of his century and to fight ignorance and obscurantism. Charles Perrault was a prolific writer of children's fairy tales including Puss in Boots, Cinderella, Sleeping Beauty and Bluebeard. At the start of the 19th century, symbolist poetry was an important movement, with poets such as Charles Baudelaire, Paul Verlaine and Stéphane Mallarmé.

Victor Hugo is sometimes seen as "the greatest French writer of all time" for excelling in all literary genres. Hugo's verse has been compared to that of Shakespeare, Dante and Homer. His novel Les Misérables is widely seen as one of the greatest novels ever written, and The Hunchback of Notre Dame has remained immensely popular. Other major authors of the 19th century include Alexandre Dumas (The Three Musketeers and The Count of Monte Cristo), Jules Verne (Twenty Thousand Leagues Under the Seas), Émile Zola (Les Rougon-Macquart), Honoré de Balzac (La Comédie humaine), Guy de Maupassant, Théophile Gautier and Stendhal (The Red and the Black, The Charterhouse of Parma).

In the early 20th century France was a haven for literary freedom. Works banned for obscenity in the US, the UK and other Anglophone nations were published in France decades before they were available in the respective authors' home countries. The French were disinclined to punish literary figures for their writing, and prosecutions were rare. Important writers of the 20th century include Marcel Proust, Louis-Ferdinand Céline, Jean Cocteau, Albert Camus, and Jean-Paul Sartre. Antoine de Saint-Exupéry wrote The Little Prince, which is one of the best selling books in history.

==== Philosophy ====
Medieval French philosophy was dominated by Scholasticism until the emergence of Humanism in the Renaissance. Modern philosophy began in the 17th century with René Descartes, Blaise Pascal and Nicolas Malebranche. Descartes was the first Western philosopher since ancient times to attempt to build a philosophical system from the ground up rather than building on the work of predecessors. Major philosophical contributions in the 18th century included Voltaire, who came to embody the Enlightenment, and Jean-Jacques Rousseau, whose work highly influenced the French Revolution. French philosophers made major contributions to the field in the 20th century including the existentialist works of Simone de Beauvoir, Camus, and Sartre. Other influential contributors include the moral and political works of Simone Weil, contributions to structuralism including from Claude Lévi-Strauss and the post-structuralist works by Michel Foucault.

=== Music ===
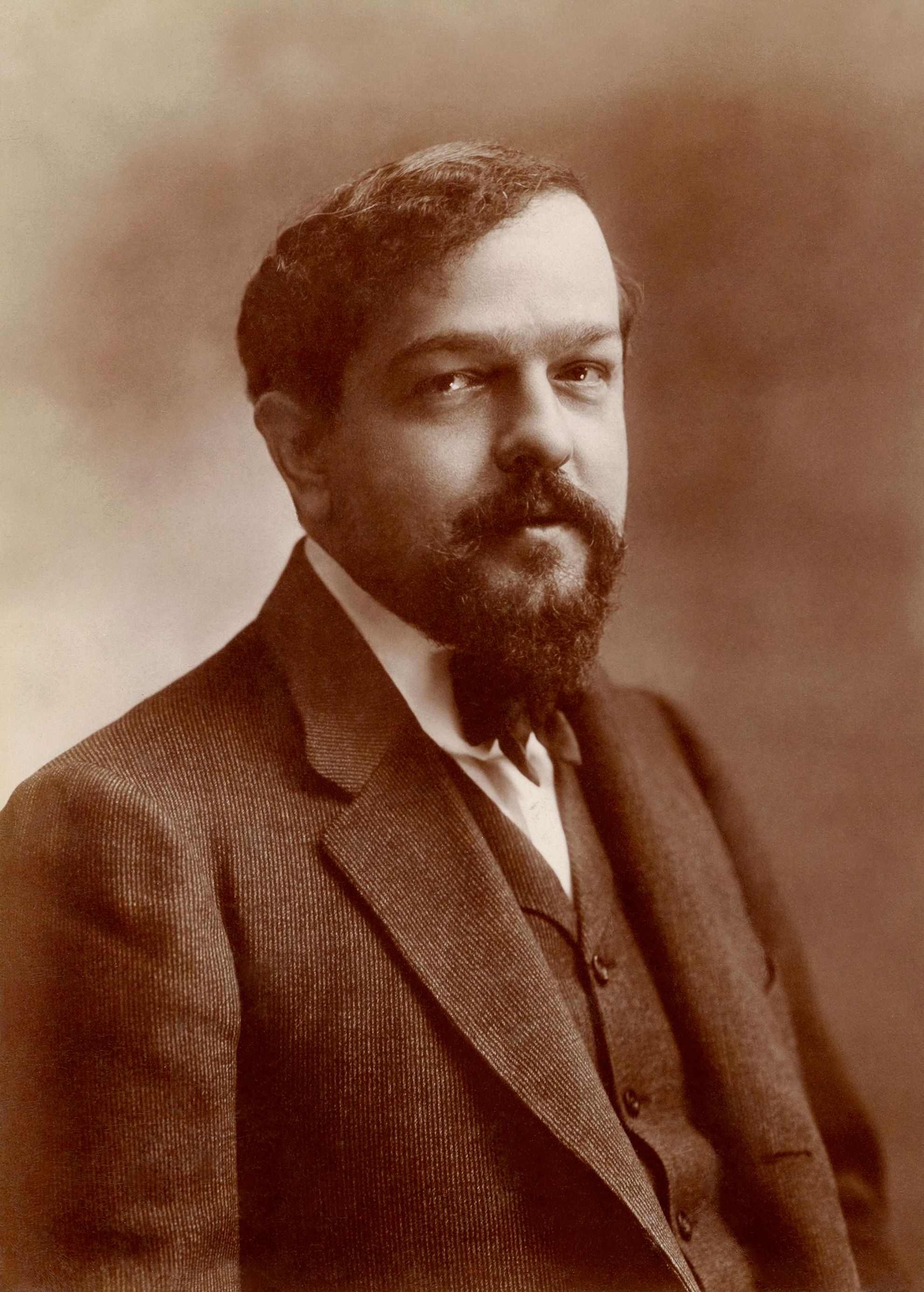
Claude Debussy, a French composer

French music experienced a golden age in the 17th century thanks to Louis XIV, who employed talented musicians and composers in the royal court. Composers of this period include Marc-Antoine Charpentier, François Couperin, Michel-Richard Delalande, Jean-Baptiste Lully and Marin Marais, all of them composers at the court. After the death of Louis XIV, French musical creation lost dynamism, but in the next century the music of Jean-Philippe Rameau achieved some prestige. Rameau became the dominant composer of French opera and the leading French composer of the harpsichord.

In the field of classical music, France has produced notable composers such as Gabriel Fauré, Claude Debussy, Maurice Ravel, and Hector Berlioz. Debussy and Ravel are the most prominent figures associated with Impressionist music. The two composers invented new musical forms and new sounds. Debussy was among the most influential composers of the late 19th and early 20th centuries, and his use of non-traditional scales and chromaticism influenced many composers who followed. His music is noted for its sensory content and frequent usage of atonality. Erik Satie was a key member of the early-20th-century Parisian avant-garde. Francis Poulenc's best-known works are his piano suite Trois mouvements perpétuels (1919), the ballet Les Biches (1923), the Concert champêtre (1928) for harpsichord and orchestra, the opera Dialogues des Carmélites (1957) and the Gloria (1959) for soprano, choir and orchestra. In the middle of the 20th century, Maurice Ohana, Pierre Schaeffer and Pierre Boulez contributed to the evolution of contemporary classical music.

French music then followed the rapid emergence of pop and rock music in the middle of the 20th century. Although English-speaking creations achieved popularity in the country, French pop music, known as chanson française, has also remained very popular. Among the most important French artists of the century are Édith Piaf, Georges Brassens, Léo Ferré, Charles Aznavour and Serge Gainsbourg. Modern pop music has seen the rise of popular French hip hop, French rock, techno/funk, and turntablists/DJs. Although there are very few rock bands in France compared to English-speaking countries, bands such as Noir Désir, Mano Negra, Niagara, Les Rita Mitsouko and more recently Superbus, Phoenix and Gojira, or Shaka Ponk, have reached worldwide popularity.

=== Cinema ===
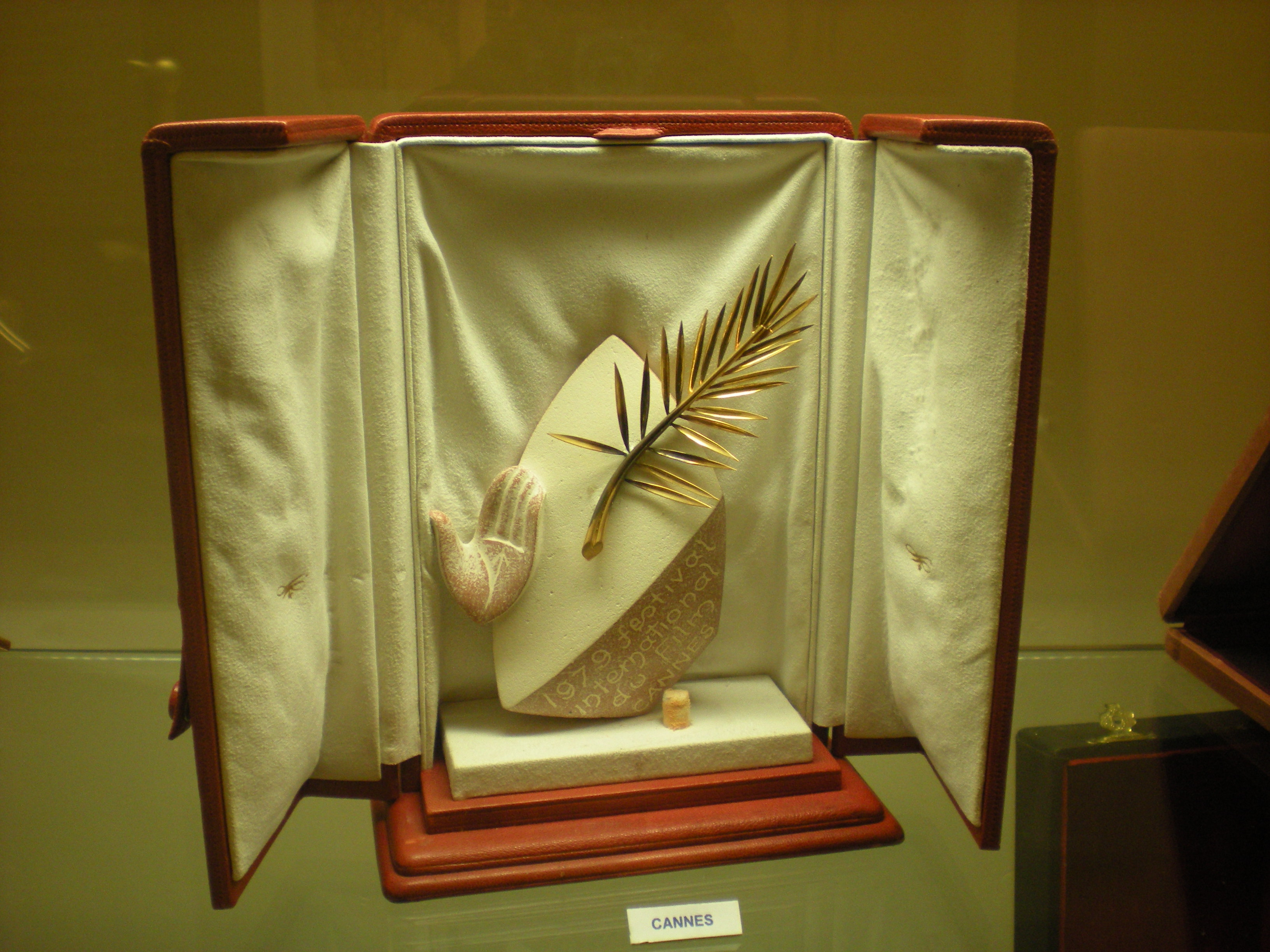
A Palme d'Or from the Cannes Film Festival, one of the "Big Three" film festivals alongside the Venice Film Festival and Berlin International Film Festival

France has historical and strong links with cinema, with two Frenchmen, Auguste and Louis Lumière (known as the Lumière Brothers) credited with creating cinema in 1895. The world's first female filmmaker, Alice Guy-Blaché, was also from France. Several important cinematic movements, including the late 1950s and 1960s Nouvelle Vague, began in the country. It is noted for having a strong film industry, due in part to protections afforded by the government. France remains a leader in filmmaking, as of 2015 producing more films than any other European country. The nation also hosts the Cannes Festival, one of the most important and famous film festivals in the world.

Apart from its strong and innovative film tradition, France has also been a gathering spot for artists from across Europe and the world. For this reason, French cinema is sometimes intertwined with the cinema of foreign nations. Directors from nations such as Poland (Roman Polanski, Krzysztof Kieślowski, Andrzej Żuławski), Argentina (Gaspar Noé, Edgardo Cozarinsky), Russia (Alexandre Alexeieff, Anatole Litvak), Austria (Michael Haneke) and Georgia (Géla Babluani, Otar Iosseliani) are prominent in the ranks of French cinema. Conversely, French directors have had prolific and influential careers in other countries, such as Luc Besson, Jacques Tourneur or Francis Veber in the United States. Although the French film market is dominated by Hollywood, France is the only nation in the world where American films make up the smallest share of total film revenues, at 50%, compared with 77% in Germany and 69% in Japan. French films account for 35% of the total film revenues of France, which is the highest percentage of national film revenues in the developed world outside the United States, compared to 14% in Spain and 8% in the UK. In 2013, France was the second-largest exporter of films in the world, after the United States.

As part of its advocacy of cultural exception, a political concept of treating culture differently from other commercial products, France succeeded in convincing all EU members to refuse to include culture and audiovisuals in the list of liberalised sectors of the WTO in 1993. This decision was confirmed in a vote by UNESCO in 2005.

=== Fashion ===
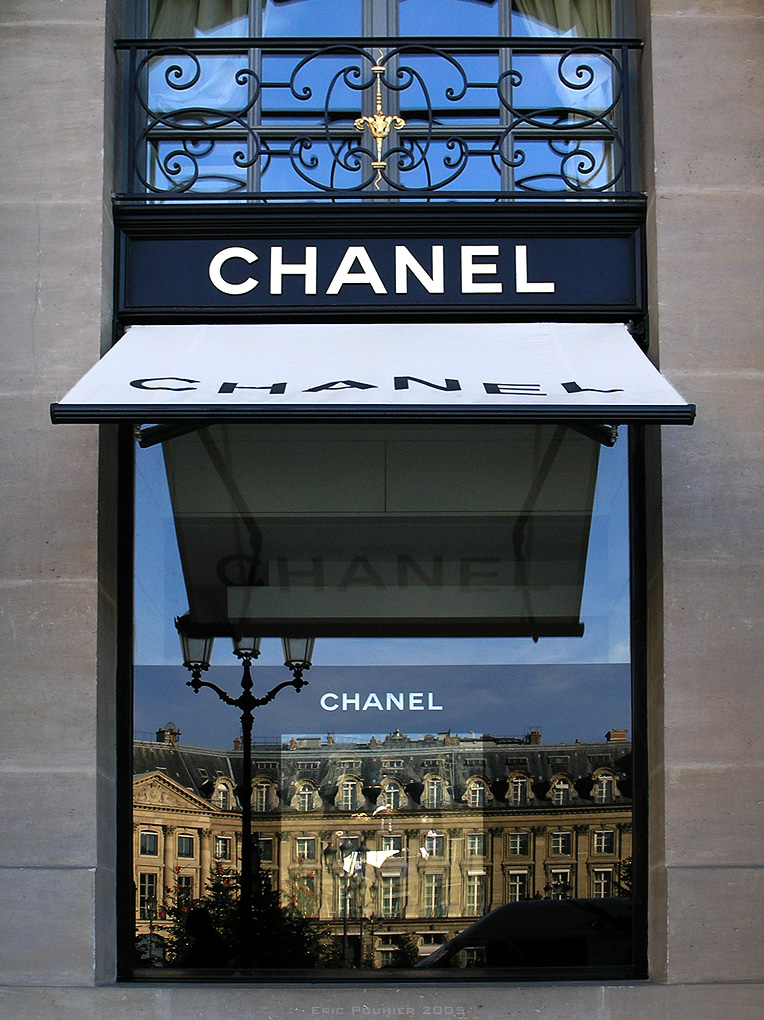
Chanel's headquarters on Place Vendôme, Paris

Fashion has been an important industry and cultural export of France since the 17th century, and modern "haute couture" originated in Paris in the 1860s. Today, Paris, along with London, Milan, and New York City, is considered one of the world's fashion capitals, and the city is home or headquarters to many of the premier fashion houses. The expression Haute couture is, in France, a legally protected name, guaranteeing certain quality standards.

The association of France with fashion and style (French: la mode) dates largely to the reign of Louis XIV. France renewed its dominance of the high fashion (French: couture or haute couture) industry in the years 1860–1960 through the establishment of the great couturier houses such as Chanel, Dior, and Givenchy. The French perfume industry is the world leader in its sector and is centred on the town of Grasse.

According to 2017 data compiled by Deloitte, Louis Vuitton Moet Hennessey (LVMH), a French brand, is the largest luxury company in the world by sales, selling more than twice the amount of its nearest competitor. Moreover, France also possesses 3 of the top 10 luxury goods companies by sales (LVMH, Kering SA, L'Oréal), more than any other country in the world.

=== Media ===
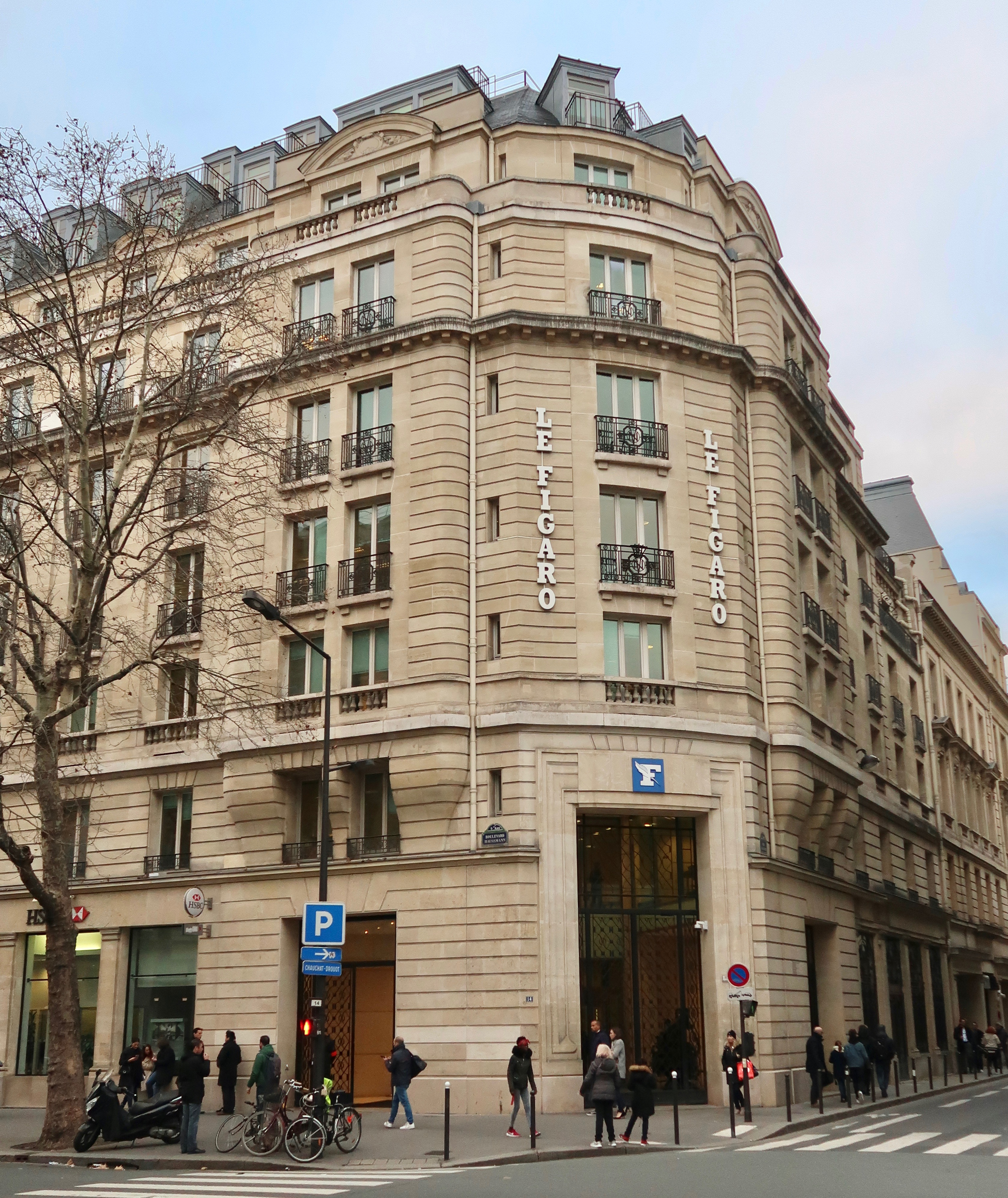
Le Figaro was founded in 1826 and is still considered a newspaper of record.

In 2021, regional daily newspapers, such as Ouest-France, Sud Ouest, La Voix du Nord, Dauphiné Libéré, Le Télégramme, and Le Progrès, more than doubled the sales of national newspapers, such as Le Monde, Le Figaro, L'Équipe (sports), Le Parisien, and Les Echos (finance). Free dailies, distributed in metropolitan centres, continue to increase their market share. The sector of weekly magazines includes more than 400 specialised weekly magazines published in the country.

The most influential news magazines are the left-wing Le Nouvel Observateur, centrist L'Express and right-wing Le Point (in 2009 more than 400,000 copies), but the highest circulation numbers for weeklies are attained by TV magazines and by women's magazines, among them Marie Claire and Elle, which have foreign versions. Influential weeklies also include investigative and satirical papers Le Canard Enchaîné and Charlie Hebdo, as well as Paris Match. As in most industrialised nations, the print media have been affected by a severe crisis with the rise of the internet. In 2008, the government launched a major initiative to help the sector reform and become financially independent, but in 2009 it had to give €600,000 to help the print media cope with the 2008 financial crisis, in addition to existing subsidies. In 1974, after years of centralised monopoly on radio and television, the governmental agency ORTF was split into several national institutions, but the three already-existing TV channels and four national radio stations remained under state control. It was only in 1981 that the government allowed free broadcasting in the territory.

Some consider hate speech laws in France to be too broad or severe, undermining freedom of speech.

=== Cuisine ===
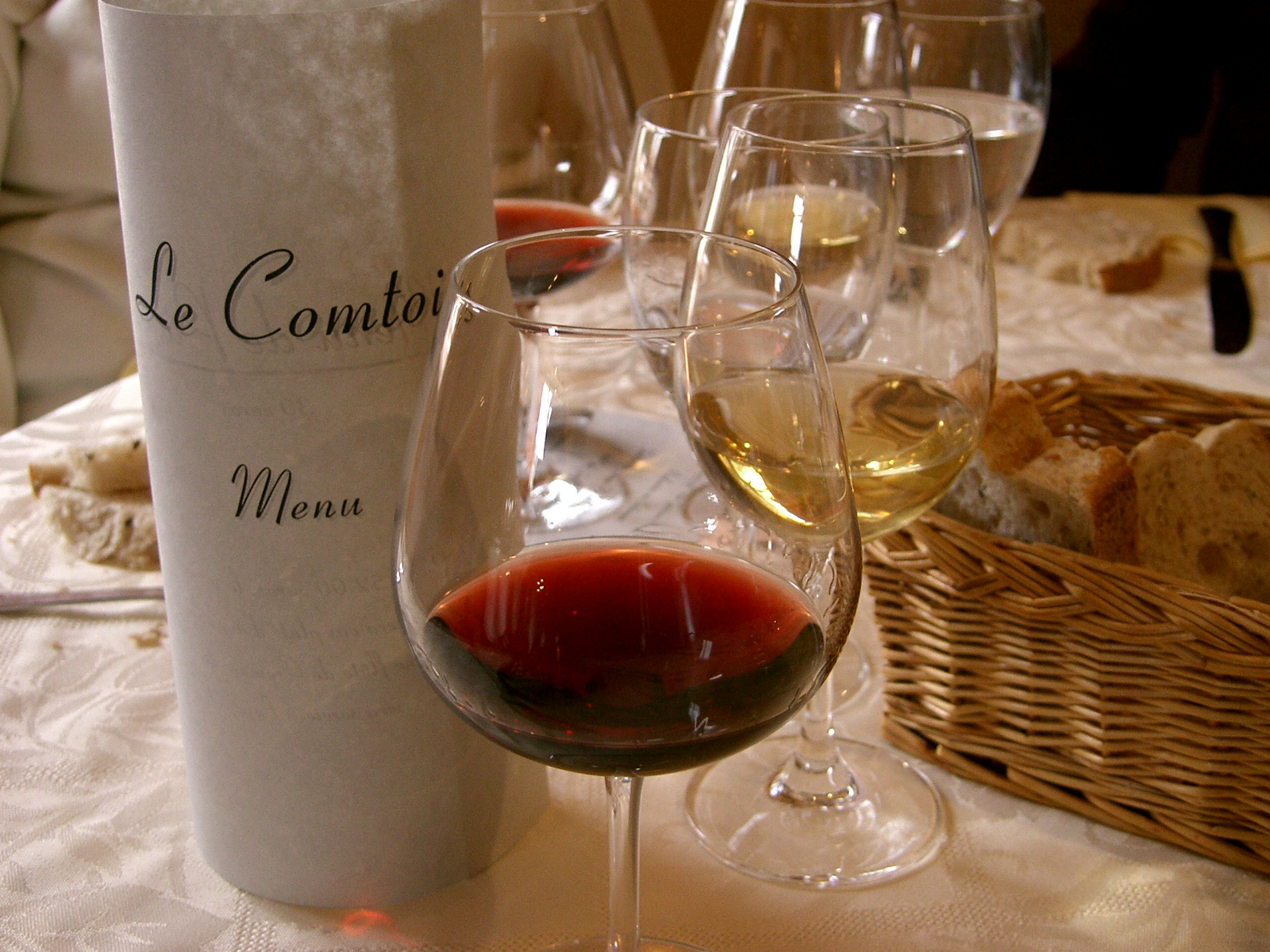
French wines are usually made to accompany French cuisine.

Different regions have different styles. In the north, butter and cream are common ingredients, whereas olive oil is more commonly used in the south. Each region of France has traditional specialties: cassoulet in the southwest, choucroute in Alsace, quiche in the Lorraine region, beef bourguignon in Burgundy, Provençal tapenade, etc. France is most famous for its wines and cheeses, which are often named for the territory where they are produced (AOC). A meal typically consists of three courses, entrée ('starter'), plat principal ('main course'), and fromage ('cheese') or dessert, sometimes with a salad served before the cheese or dessert.

French cuisine is also regarded as a key element of the quality of life and the attractiveness of France. A French publication, the Michelin Guide, awards Michelin stars for excellence to a select few establishments. The acquisition or loss of a star can have dramatic effects on the success of a restaurant. By 2006, the Michelin Guide had awarded 620 stars to French restaurants.

In addition to its wine tradition, France is also a major producer of beer and rum. The three main French brewing regions are Alsace (60% of national production), Nord-Pas-de-Calais, and Lorraine. French rum is made in distilleries on islands in the Atlantic and Indian oceans.

=== Sport ===
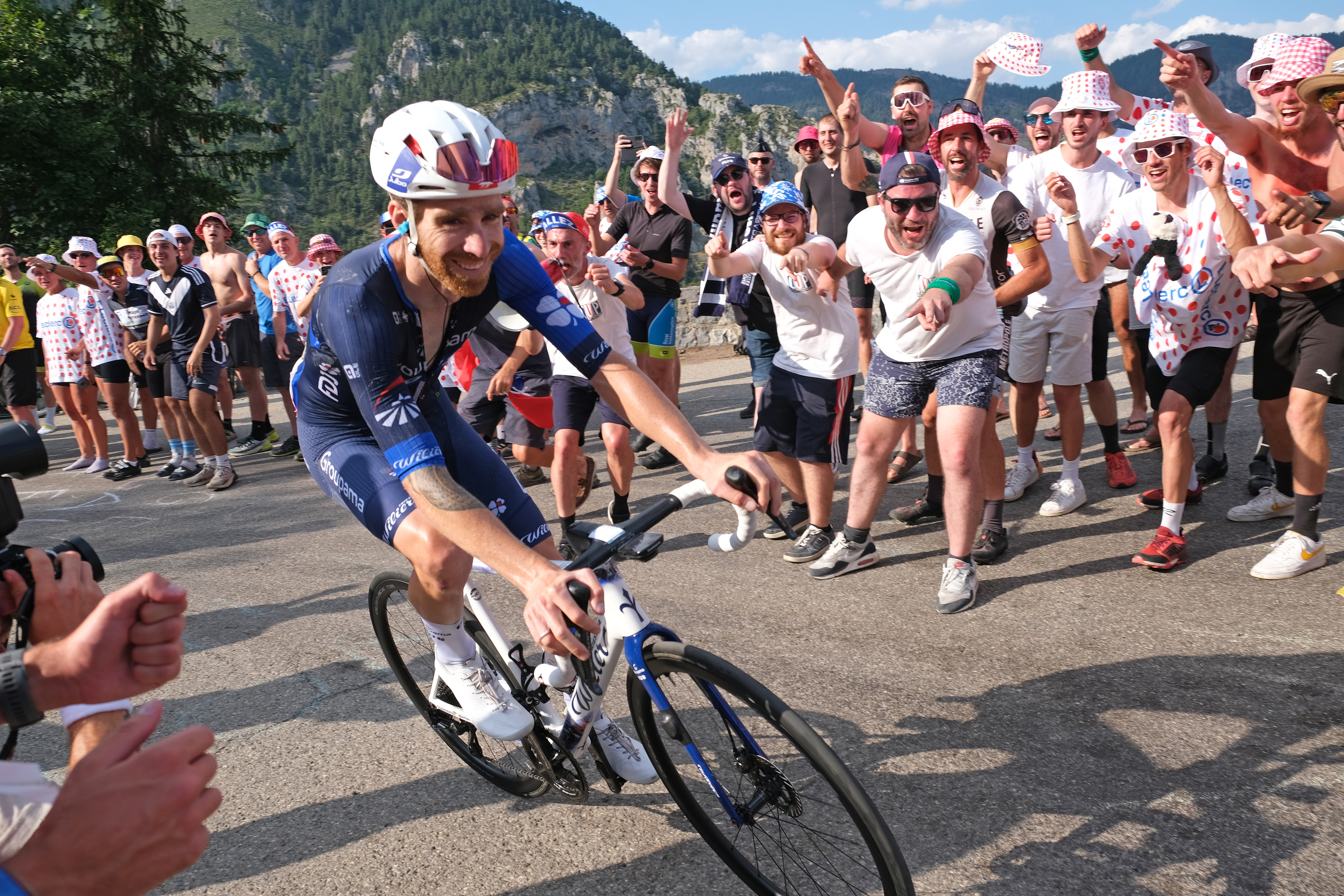
Starting in 1903, the Tour de France is the most prestigious of Grands Tours, and the world's most famous cycling race.

France hosts "the world's biggest annual sporting event", the annual cycling race Tour de France. Other popular sports played in France include football, judo, tennis, rugby union and pétanque. France has hosted events such as the 1938 and 1998 FIFA World Cups, the 2007 Rugby World Cup, and the 2023 Rugby World Cup. The country also hosted the 1960 European Nations' Cup, UEFA Euro 1984, UEFA Euro 2016 and 2019 FIFA Women's World Cup. The Stade de France in Saint-Denis is France's largest stadium and was the venue for the 1998 FIFA World Cup and 2007 Rugby World Cup finals. Since 1923, the country has hosted the famous 24 Hours of Le Mans sports car endurance race. Several major tennis tournaments also take place in France, including the Paris Masters and the French Open, one of the four Grand Slam tournaments. Martial arts originating in France include Savate and Fencing. France will also host the 2031 FIBA Basketball World Cup, marking the first time the country has hosted a international basketball competition.

France has a close association with the Modern Olympic Games; it was a French aristocrat, Baron Pierre de Coubertin, who suggested the Games' revival, at the end of the 19th century. Paris hosted the second Games in 1900, and has hosted the Olympics on five further occasions: the 1924 Summer Olympics, the 2024 Summer Olympics both in Paris and three Winter Games (1924 in Chamonix, 1968 in Grenoble and 1992 in Albertville) will host again in 2030 in the French Alps France introduced Olympics for deaf people (Deaflympics) in 1924.

Both the national football team, the national basketball team and the national rugby union team are nicknamed "Les Bleus". Football is the most popular sport in France, with over 1,800,000 registered players and over 18,000 registered clubs. Rugby union is also popular, particularly in Paris and the southwest of France. The national rugby union team has competed at every Rugby World Cup; it also takes part in the annual Six Nations Championship. Basketball is another strong sport the France plays. They also competed nine times in the FIBA Basketball World Cup.

The French Open, also called Roland-Garros, is a major tennis tournament held over two weeks between late May and early June at the Stade Roland-Garros in Paris. It is the premier clay court tennis championship event in the world and the second of four annual Grand Slam tournaments.

== See also ==
- Outline of France
- Religion in France
