= List of internet top-level domains =

This list of internet top-level domains (TLD) contains top-level domains, which are those domains in the DNS root zone of the Domain Name System of the internet. A list of the top-level domains by the Internet Assigned Numbers Authority (IANA) is maintained at the Root Zone Database. IANA also oversees the approval process for new proposed top-level domains for ICANN. As of February 2026, the IANA root database includes 1593 TLDs. This database also includes 156 that are not assigned (revoked or retired) and 11 test domains, all of which are not represented in IANA's TLD listing nor in the root.zone file (the file also includes one root domain).

== Types ==
IANA distinguishes the following groups of top-level domains:

- infrastructure top-level domain (ARPA)
- generic top-level domains (gTLD)
- generic-restricted top-level domains (grTLD)
- sponsored top-level domains (sTLD)
- country code top-level domains (ccTLD)
- test top-level domains (tTLD)

== Original top-level domains ==
Seven generic top-level domains were created early in the development of the internet, prior to the creation of ICANN in 1998.

DNS name	Intended use	Managers	Notes	Has support for IDNs?	DS records for DNSSEC?	SLD	IPv6
.com	Commercial	Verisign	This is an open TLD; any person or entity is permitted to register. Though originally intended for use by for-profit business entities, it became the main TLD for domain names, used by all types of entities including nonprofits, schools, and private individuals. Domain name registrations may be successfully challenged if the holder cannot prove an outside relation justifying reservation of the name, to prevent "squatting". It was originally administered by the United States Department of Defense.	Yes	Yes	Yes	Yes
.org	Organization	Public Interest Registry	This is an open TLD; any person or entity is permitted to register. Originally created as a miscellaneous category as stated in RFC 920 (October 1984) "...any other domains meeting the second level requirements," and clarified in RFC 1591 (March 1994), "This domain is intended as the miscellaneous TLD for organizations that didn't fit anywhere else. Some non-government organizations may fit here." While mainly non-profits have used this domain, it was never restricted from miscellaneous use.	Yes	Yes	Yes	Yes
.net	Network	Verisign	This is an open TLD; any person or entity is permitted to register. According to RFC 1591 (March 1994) "This domain is intended to hold only the computers of network providers."	Yes	Yes	Yes	Yes
.int	International	Internet Assigned Numbers Authority	The .int TLD is strictly limited to organizations, offices, and programs endorsed by a treaty between two or more nations. However, a few grandfathered domains do not meet these criteria.	No	Yes	Yes	Yes
.edu	Education	Educause (via Verisign)	The .edu TLD is limited to higher educational institutions, for example trade schools and universities. In the U.S., its use was restricted in 2001 to post-secondary institutions accredited by an agency on the list of nationally recognized accrediting agencies. This domain is therefore almost exclusively used by colleges and universities. Some institutions, such as the Exploratorium, that do not meet the registration criteria have grandfathered domain names.	No	Yes	Yes	Yes
.gov	U.S. national and state government agencies	Cybersecurity and Infrastructure Security Agency (via Verisign)	The .gov TLD is limited to United States governmental entities and agencies as well as qualifying state, county and local municipal government agencies, and tribal governments.	No	Yes	Yes	Yes
.mil	U.S. military	United States Department of Defense	The .mil TLD is restricted to departments, services and agencies of the United States Department of Defense.	No	Yes	Yes	Yes

== Infrastructure top-level domains ==
Infrastructure	Entity	Notes	IDN	DNSSEC
.arpa	"Address and Routing Parameter Area"	Originally assigned to the Advanced Research Projects Agency in the early days on the internet, .arpa is now exclusively used as an internet infrastructure TLD.	No	Yes

== Country code top-level domains ==
As of 20 May 2017, there were 255 country-code top-level domains, purely in the Latin alphabet, using two-character codes. As of June 2022, the number was 316, with the addition of internationalized domains.

== ICANN-era generic top-level domains ==
- Target market: intended use
- Operator: entity the registry has been delegated to
- DNSSEC: presence of DS records for Domain Name System Security Extensions

=== Chinese ===
DNS name	Chinese term	Translation	Restrictions	Manager	Has support for IDNs?	DS records for DNSSEC?
.ren	人 rén	"people/person" in Mandarin pinyin	Restricted TLD	(Cancelled)	Unknown	Yes
.shouji	手机 shǒujī	mobile phone	—	QIHOO 360 TECHNOLOGY CO. LTD.		
.tushu	图书 túshū	books	—	Amazon Registry Services, Inc.		
.wanggou	网购 wǎnggòu	online shopping	—	Amazon Registry Services, Inc.		
.weibo	微博 wēibó	microblogging	—	Sina Corporation		
.xihuan	喜欢 xǐhuān	like	—	QIHOO 360 TECHNOLOGY CO. LTD.		
.xin	信 xìn	credit; honest	—	Alibaba Group		

=== French ===
DNS name	Translation	Restrictions	Manager	Has support for IDNs?	DS records for DNSSEC?
.arte	Association relative à la télévision européenne, whose acronym is arte, "art"	—	Association Relative à la Télévision Européenne G.E.I.E.		
.clinique	"clinic or hospital"	—	The Estée Lauder Companies Inc.		
.luxe	"luxury"	—	Minds + Machines (Note: A subsidiary of Minds + Machines Group (formerly Top Level Domain Holdings.))	Unknown	Yes
.maison	"house"	—	Identity Digital (Note: Operating as Binky Moon, LLC, a shell company subsidiary of Identity Digital)	Yes	Yes
.moi	"me"	—	Amazon Registry Services, Inc.		
.rsvp	Invitations and replies	—	Charleston Road Registry Inc. (Google) (Note: Operated by Charleston Road Registry, Inc., a subsidiary of Google. See .)	Unknown	Yes
.sarl	Société à responsabilité limitée, Francophone Limited liability company	—	Identity Digital	Yes	Yes

=== German ===
DNS name	Translation	Restrictions	Manager	Has support for IDNs?	DS records for DNSSEC?
.epost	e-mail	—	Deutsche Post AG		
.gmbh	GmbH	Current or pending designation as a GmbH company whose existence can be validated with the respective public authorities in Austria, Germany, Liechtenstein or Switzerland.	Identity Digital	Yes	Yes
.haus	"house"	—	Identity Digital (Note: Operating as Dog Beach, LLC, a shell company subsidiary of Identity Digital)	Yes	Yes
.immobilien	"real estate"	—	Identity Digital	Yes	Yes
.jetzt	"now"	—	Identity Digital	Yes	Yes
.kaufen	"buy"	—	Identity Digital	Yes	Yes
.kinder	"children"	Restricted .brand TLD for use by the Kinder brand of sweets.	Ferrero Trading Lux S.A.		
.reise	"travel"	Must be an eligible member of the travel business community and domain must be used for travel-related purposes.	Identity Digital	Yes	Yes
.reisen	"traveling"	—	Identity Digital	Yes	Yes
.schule	"school"	—	Identity Digital	Yes	Yes
.versicherung	"insurance"	—		Latin script	Yes

=== Hindi ===
DNS name	Translation	Restrictions	Manager	Has support for IDNs?	DS records for DNSSEC?
.desi	Desi (देसी), term for the peoples of the Indian subcontinent	—	Desi Networks	Unknown	Yes
.shiksha	शिक्षा, "education"	—	Identity Digital	Unknown	Yes

=== Italian ===
DNS name	Translation	Restrictions	Manager	Has support for IDNs?	DS records for DNSSEC?
.casa	"house"	—	Minds + Machines	Yes	Yes
.immo	French, German, and Italian abbreviation for "real estate"	—	Identity Digital	Yes	Yes
.moda	"fashion"	—	Identity Digital	Yes	Yes
.voto	"vote", for election and campaign websites	Initially only available to registrations in the United States.	Identity Digital	Unknown	Yes

=== Portuguese ===
DNS name	Translation	Restrictions	Manager	Has support for IDNs?	DS records for DNSSEC?
.bom	"good"	—	Núcleo de Informação e Coordenação do Ponto BR – NIC.br		
.passagens	"ticket"	—	Travel Reservations SRL		

=== Spanish ===
DNS name	Translation	Restrictions	Manager	Has support for IDNs?	DS records for DNSSEC?
.abogado	"lawyer"	Restricted to licensed lawyers or law firms.	Minds + Machines	Unknown	Yes
.futbol	"Football" (soccer)	—	Identity Digital	Yes	Yes
.gratis	"free"	—	Identity Digital	Yes	Yes
.hoteles	"hotels"	—	Travel Reservations SRL		
.juegos	"games"	—	Identity Digital		Yes
.ltda	companies in South America	Domains are limited to registered LTDAs (like LLCs) in Brazil, Colombia, Chile, and Ecuador.	InterNetX	Unknown	Yes
.soy	"I am" Also refers to the soybean and its food derivatives	—	Charleston Road Registry Inc. (Google)	Latin script, Japanese	Yes
.tienda	"shop", "store"	—	Identity Digital	Yes	Yes
.uno	"one", for websites targeting Spanish speaking consumers	—		Spanish	Yes
.viajes	"travel" or "trips"	—	Identity Digital	Spanish	Yes
.vuelos	"flights"	—	Travel Reservations SRL	Yes	Yes

== Internationalized generic top-level domains ==
All of these TLDs are internationalized domain names (IDN) and support second-level IDNs.

=== Arabic script ===
DNS Name	IDN	Language	Script	Transliteration	English Translation	Notes	DS records for DNSSEC?
xn--4gbrim	.موقع	Arabic	Arabic	mawqiʿ	"site" or "location"	Open TLD	Yes
xn--fhbei	.كوم		Arabic	kūm	com	Owned by: VeriSign Sarl	
xn--mgbb9fbpob	.موبايلي		Arabic	mūbāylī	Mobily	Owned by: GreenTech Consultancy Company W.L.L.	
xn--mgbi4ecexp	.كاثوليك		Arabic	kāthūlīk	Catholic	Owned by: Pontificium Consilium de Comunicationibus Socialibus (PCCS) (Pontifical Council for Social Communication)	
xn--ngbc5azd	.شبكة	Arabic	Arabic	shabaka	"network"	Open TLD	Yes
xn--ngbe9e0a	.بيتك		Arabic	baytak	your home	Owned by: Kuwait Finance House	
xn--mgbab2bd	.بازار	Persian	Arabic	bâzâr	"market", "bazaar"	Open TLD	Yes

=== Chinese characters ===
DNS Name	IDN	Language	Script	Transliteration	English Translation	Notes	DS records for DNSSEC?
xn--3ds443g	.在线	Chinese	Chinese (Simplified)	zàixiàn	"online"	Open TLD. The Chinese Government quickly bought 20,000 internationalized subdomains for localities.	Yes
xn--fiq228c5hs	.中文网	Chinese	Chinese (Simplified)	Zhōngwén wǎng	"(written) Chinese (language) network"	Open TLD. The Chinese Government quickly bought 20,000 internationalized subdomains for localities.	Yes
xn--ses554g	.网址	Chinese	Chinese (Simplified)	wǎngzhǐ	"network address" or "website"	Open TLD	Yes
xn--5tzm5g	.网站	Chinese	Chinese (Simplified)	wǎngzhàn	"website"	Open TLD	Yes
xn--io0a7i	.网络	Chinese	Chinese (Simplified)	wǎngluò	"network"	Open TLD	Yes
xn--55qx5d	.公司	Chinese	Chinese (Simplified and Traditional)	gōngsī	"business organization" or "company"	Open TLD	Yes
xn--czru2d	.商城	Chinese	Chinese (Simplified and Traditional)	shāngchéng	"mall"	Open TLD	Yes
xn--nqv7f	.机构	Chinese	Chinese (Simplified)	jīgòu	"agency"	Open TLD	Yes
xn--6qq986b3xl	.我爱你	Chinese	Chinese (Simplified)	wǒ ài nǐ	"I love you"	Open TLD	Yes
xn--czr694b	.商标	Chinese	Chinese (Simplified)	shāngbiāo	"trademark"	Open TLD	Yes
xn--rhqv96g	.世界	Chinese and Japanese	Chinese (Simplified and Traditional), Kanji	shìjiè sekai	"world"	Open TLD	Yes
xn--3bst00m	.集团	Chinese	Chinese (Simplified)	jítuán	"conglomerate"	Open TLD	Yes
xn--30rr7y	.慈善	Chinese and Japanese	Chinese (Simplified and Traditional), Kanji	císhàn jizen	"philanthropy"	Open TLD	Yes
xn--45q11c	.八卦	Chinese	Chinese (Simplified and Traditional)	bāguà	"gossip"	Open TLD	Yes
xn--55qw42g	.公益	Chinese and Japanese	Chinese (Simplified and Traditional), Kanji	gōngyì kōeki	"philanthropy"	Open TLD	Yes
xn--g2xx48c	.购物	Chinese	Chinese (Simplified)	gòuwù	"shopping"	Open TLD	Yes
xn--kput3i	.手机	Chinese	Chinese (Simplified)	shǒujī	"cell phone"	Open TLD	Yes
xn--mxtq1m	.政府	Chinese	Chinese (Simplified and Traditional)	zhèngfǔ	"public affairs"	Second level restricted to ISO3166-1 country codes; third level registrations restricted to governmental organizations, or public institutions	Yes

=== Cyrillic script ===
DNS Name	IDN	Language	Script	Transliteration	English Translation	Notes	!DS records for DNSSEC?
xn--d1acj3b	.дети	Russian	Cyrillic (Russian)	dyeti	"kids" or "children"	Open TLD	Yes
xn--80aqecdr1a	.католик		Cyrillic	Katolik	"сatholic" (as noun)	Owned by: Pontificium Consilium de Comunicationibus Socialibus (Pontifical Council for Social Communications)	
xn--j1aef	.ком	Russian	Cyrillic (Russian)	kom	"com"	Owned by: VeriSign Sarl	
xn--80asehdb	.онлайн	Russian	Cyrillic (Russian)	onlain	"online"	Open TLD	Yes
xn--c1avg	.орг	Russian	Cyrillic (Russian)	org	"org" or "organization"	Open TLD	Yes
xn--80aswg	.сайт	Russian	Cyrillic (Russian)	sait	"site"	Open TLD	Yes
xn--p1ai	.рф	Russian	Cyrillic (Russian)	rf	"Russian Federation"		Yes

=== Japanese characters ===
DNS Name	IDN	Script	Transliteration	English Translation	Notes	!DS records for DNSSEC?
xn--q9jyb4c	.みんな	Hiragana	minna	everyone	Open TLD	Yes
xn--1ck2e1b	.セール	Katakana	sēru	sale	Owned by: Amazon Registry Services, Inc.	
xn--bck1b9a5dre4c	.ファッション	Katakana	fasshon	fashion		
xn--cck2b3b	.ストア	Katakana	sutoa	store		
xn--eckvdtc9d	.ポイント	Katakana	pointo	point		
xn--gckr3f0f	.クラウド	Katakana	kuraudo	cloud		
xn--tckwe	.コム	Katakana	komu	com	Owned by: VeriSign Sarl	

=== Other scripts ===
DNS Name	IDN	Language	Script	Transliteration	English Translation	Notes	!DS records for DNSSEC?
xn--54b7fta0cc	.বাংলা	Bengali	Bengali	Bānlā	Bangla	Open TLD	
xn‑‑h2brj9c	.भारत	Hindi	Devanagari	bharat	India		
xn--i1b6b1a6a2e	.संगठन	Marathi, Hindi	Devanagari	saṅgaṭhana	"organization"	Open TLD	Yes
xn--11b4c3d	.कॉम	Marathi, Hindi	Devanagari	kom	com		
xn--c2br7g	.नेट	Marathi, Hindi	Devanagari	net	net		
xn--mk1bu44c	.닷컴	Korean	Hangul	datkeom / tatk'ŏm	dotcom		
xn--t60b56a	.닷넷	Korean	Hangul	datnet / tatnet	dotnet		
xn--9dbq2a	.קום	Hebrew	Hebrew	kum	com	Open TLD	Yes
xn--42c2d9a	.คอม	Thai	Thai	khom	com		

== Geographic top-level domains ==
=== Africa ===
DNS name	Target geographic area	Notes	Has support for IDNs?	DS records for DNSSEC?
.africa	Africa			Yes
.capetown	Cape Town, South Africa		Unknown	Yes
.durban	Durban, South Africa		Unknown	Yes
.joburg	Johannesburg, South Africa		Unknown	Yes

=== Asia ===
DNS name	Target geographic area	Notes	Has support for IDNs?	DS records for DNSSEC?
.abudhabi	Abu Dhabi, UAE			Yes
.arab	League of Arab States			Yes
.asia	Asia–Pacific region	This is a TLD for companies, organizations, and individuals based in the region of Asia, Australia, and the Pacific.	Chinese, Japanese, Korean	Yes
.doha	Doha, Qatar			
.dubai	Dubai, UAE			Yes
.krd	Kurdistan	This is a TLD for companies, organizations, and individuals based in the region of Kurdistan	Kurdish	Yes
.kyoto	Kyoto, Japan			Yes
.nagoya	Nagoya, Japan		Japanese	Yes
.okinawa	Okinawa		Japanese	Yes
.osaka	Osaka, Japan			Yes
.ryukyu	Ryukyu Islands, Japan		Unknown	Yes
.taipei	Taipei, Taiwan	Introduced in September 2014	Unknown	Yes
.tokyo	Tokyo, Japan		Yes	Yes
.yokohama	Yokohama, Japan		Japanese	Yes

=== Europe ===
Geographic TLDs in Belgium
DNS name	Entity	Notes	Has support for IDNs?	DS records for DNSSEC?
.brussels	Brussels	The English designation is used to avoid translation issues. The domains .brussel and .bruxelles are not permitted, as they are considered derivatives.	Latin script	Yes
.gent	Ghent		Unknown	Yes
.vlaanderen	Flanders		Latin script	Yes

Geographic TLDs in France
DNS name	Entity	Notes	Has support for IDNs?	DS records for DNSSEC?
.alsace	Alsace	"The purpose of .ALSACE is to bring Alsatian culture and identity to the Internet, make our region more visible internationally and boost the digital economy in Alsace."	Unknown	Yes
.bzh	Brittany	Breizh in Breton. This is a TLD for Web sites in the Breton language or related to Breton culture	French	Yes
.corsica	Corsica	TLD Related to Corsican Culture	Unknown	Yes
.eus	Basque, Spain and France	Euskal Herria in Basque. Web sites must be in the Basque language and are checked periodically.	Unknown	Yes
.paris	Paris	"Must be an individual or corporate entity with a bona fide presence in the Greater area of Paris"	Yes	Yes

Geographic TLDs in Germany
DNS name	Entity	Notes	Has support for IDNs?	DS records for DNSSEC?
.bayern	Bavaria		Yes	Yes
.berlin	Berlin	Must have a connection to Berlin, Germany. For example: a company based in Berlin, a person from Berlin, etc.	Latin and Cyrillic scripts	Yes
.cologne	Cologne		Yes	Yes
.koeln	Cologne		Yes	Yes
.hamburg	Hamburg		Latin script	Yes
.nrw	North Rhine-Westphalia		Yes	Yes
.ruhr	Ruhr		German	Yes
.saarland	Saarland		Unknown	Yes

Geographic TLDs in Spain
DNS name	Entity	Notes	Has support for IDNs?	DS records for DNSSEC?
.bcn	Barcelona			Yes
.barcelona	Barcelona		Unknown	Yes
.cat	Catalonia	This is a TLD for Web sites in the Catalan language or related to Catalan culture.	Catalan	Yes
.eus	Basque, Spain and France	Euskal Herria in Basque. Web sites must be in the Basque language and are checked periodically.	Unknown	Yes
.gal	Galicia	This is a TLD for Web sites in the Galician language or related to Galician culture.	Unknown	Yes
.madrid	Madrid		Unknown	Yes

Other European Geographic TLDs
DNS name	Entity		Notes	Has support for IDNs?	DS records for DNSSEC?
.eu	European Union		Available for any person, company or organization based in the European Union.	Yes	Yes
.amsterdam	Amsterdam	Netherlands		Unknown	Yes
.bar	Bar	Montenegro	Mostly used for bars and other alcohol facilities worldwide	Unknown	Yes
.cymru	Wales	United Kingdom		Welsh	Yes
.wales	Wales	United Kingdom		Welsh	Yes
.frl	Friesland	Netherlands	Fryslân in (West) Frisian, one of the twelve provinces in the Netherlands.	Unknown	Yes
.helsinki	Helsinki	Finland		Unknown	Yes
.irish	Ireland and Irish diaspora			Unknown	Yes
.ist	Istanbul	Turkey		Unknown	Yes
.istanbul	Istanbul	Turkey		Unknown	Yes
.london	London	United Kingdom		Yes	Yes
.moscow	Moscow	Russia		Yes	Yes
.scot	Scotland	United Kingdom		Unknown	Yes
.stockholm	Stockholm	Sweden	Used only by the city organisation itself.	Yes	Yes
.swiss	Switzerland		Must be a registered business with a physical presence inside of Switzerland.	Yes	Yes
.tatar	Tatar peoples and places		Tatarstan is a region in Russia, though this TLD is meant for the global Tatar community.	Unknown	Yes
.tirol	Tyrol	Austria		Yes	Yes
.wien	Vienna	Austria		Latin script	Yes
.zuerich	Zurich	Switzerland		Unknown	Yes
.su	Soviet Union			Yes	Yes

=== North America ===
DNS name	Entity		Notes	Has support for IDNs?	DS records for DNSSEC?	Alternatives
.boston	Boston, Massachusetts	United States			Yes	.boston.ma.us
.miami	Miami, Florida	United States		Unknown	Yes	.miami.fl.us
.nyc	New York City	United States		Spanish	Yes	.new-york.ny.us
.quebec	Quebec	Canada		Unknown	Yes	.qc.ca
.vegas	Las Vegas, Nevada	United States		Yes	Yes	.las-vegas.nv.us

=== Oceania ===
DNS name	Entity	Notes	Has support for IDNs?	DS records for DNSSEC?
.kiwi	New Zealand		Latin script	Yes
.melbourne	Melbourne, Australia		Unknown	Yes
.sydney	Sydney, Australia		Unknown	Yes

=== South America ===
DNS name	Entity	Notes	Has support for IDNs?	DS records for DNSSEC?
.lat	Latin America		Spanish	Yes
.rio	Rio de Janeiro, Brazil		Unknown	Yes

== Internationalized geographic top-level domains ==
DNS name	Display name	Entity	Language	Script	Transliteration	Notes	Other TLD	Has support for IDNs?	DS records for DNSSEC?
xn--1qqw23a	.佛山	Foshan, China	Chinese	Chinese (Simplified)	fat^{6} saan^{1}			Yes	Yes
xn--xhq521b	.广东	Guangdong, China	Chinese	Chinese (Simplified)	gwong^{2} dung^{1}				
xn--80adxhks	.москва	Moscow, Russia	Russian	Cyrillic (Russian)	moskva		.moscow	Russian	Yes
xn--p1acf	.рус	Russian language, post-Soviet states	Russian	Cyrillic (Russian)	rus		.su		
xn--mgbca7dzdo	.ابوظبي	Abu Dhabi	Arabic	Arabic	Abū Ẓabī		.abudhabi		
xn--ngbrx	.عرب	Arab	Arabic	Arabic	‘Arab				

== Brand and corporate top-level domains ==
DNS name	Entity	Notes	Has support for IDNs?	DS records for DNSSEC?
.aaa	American Automobile Association			Yes
.aarp	AARP			Yes
.abarth	Stellantis (Abarth)	IANA lists FCA; which merged into Stellantis in 2021		
.abb	ABB			Yes
.abbott	Abbott Laboratories			Yes
.abbvie	AbbVie			Yes
.abc	American Broadcasting Company			Yes
.accenture	Accenture			Yes
.aco	ACO Ahlmann SE & Co. KG			Yes
.aeg	Aktiebolaget Electrolux			Yes
.aetna	Aetna			Yes
.afl	Australian Football League			Yes
.agakhan	Aga Khan Foundation			Yes
.Agilent	Agilent			Yes
.aig	American International Group			Yes
.aigo	Aigo			
.airbus	Airbus			Yes
.airtel	Bharti Airtel			Yes
.akdn	Aga Khan Foundation			Yes
.alfaromeo	Stellantis (Alfa Romeo)	IANA lists FCA; which merged into Stellantis in 2021		
.alibaba	Alibaba Group			Yes
.alipay	Alibaba Group			Yes
.allfinanz	Allfinanz Deutsche Vermögensberatung Aktiengesellschaft		Unknown	Yes
.allstate	Allstate			Yes
.ally	Ally Financial			Yes
.alstom	Alstom			Yes
.amazon	Amazon			Yes
.americanexpress	American Express			Yes
.amex	American Express			Yes
.amica	Amica Mutual Insurance			Yes
.android	Google (Android)		Unknown	Yes
.anz	Australia & New Zealand Banking Group			Yes
.aol	AOL			Yes
.apple	Apple			Yes
.aquarelle	Aquarelle.com Group		Unknown	Yes
.aramco	Aramco			Yes
.arte	Arte			Yes
.audi	Audi			Yes
.audible	Audible (Amazon Registry Services, Inc.)			Yes
.auspost	Australia Post			Yes
.aws	Amazon Web Services			Yes
.axa	Axa		Yes	Yes
.azure	Microsoft (Azure)			Yes
.baidu	Baidu			Yes
.bananarepublic	Gap (Banana Republic)			
.barclaycard	Barclays		Unknown	Yes
.barclays	Barclays		Unknown	Yes
.basketball	FIBA			Yes
.bauhaus	Werkhaus GmbH			Yes
.bbc	BBC			Yes
.bbt	BB&T			Yes
.bbva	Banco Bilbao Vizcaya Argentaria			Yes
.bcg	Boston Consulting Group			Yes
.bentley	Bentley			Yes
.bestbuy	Best Buy (BBY Solutions, Inc.)			Yes
.bharti	Bharti Enterprises			Yes
.bing	Microsoft (Bing)			Yes
.blanco	BLANCO GmbH + Co KG			
.bloomberg	Bloomberg		Unknown	Yes
.bms	Bristol Myers Squibb			Yes
.bmw	BMW		No	Yes
.bnl	Banca Nazionale del Lavoro		Unknown	
.bnpparibas	BNP Paribas		Unknown	Yes
.boehringer	Boehringer Ingelheim			Yes
.bond	Bond University	Later became a gTLD on 26 November 2019		Yes
.booking	Booking.com			Yes
.bosch	Robert Bosch GmbH			Yes
.bostik	Bostik			Yes
.bradesco	Bradesco		Unknown	Yes
.brave	Brave Software			Yes
.bridgestone	Bridgestone			Yes
.brother	Brother Industries			Yes
.bugatti	Bugatti			
.cal	Google (Calendar)		Unknown	Yes
.calvinklein	PVH			Yes
.canon	Canon			Yes
.capitalone	Capital One			Yes
.caravan	Caravan International		Unknown	Yes
.cartier	Richemont DNS			
.catholic	Pontifical Council for Social Communications			Yes
.cba	Commonwealth Bank			Yes
.cbn	Christian Broadcasting Network			Yes
.cbre	CBRE Group			Yes
.cbs	CBS			
.cern	CERN		Unknown	Yes
.cfa	CFA Institute			Yes
.chanel	Chanel			Yes
.chase	Chase Bank			Yes
.chintai	Chintai Corporation			Yes
.chrome	Google (Chrome)		Unknown	Yes
.chrysler	Chrysler			
.cipriani	Hotel Cipriani Srl			Yes
.cisco	Cisco Systems			Yes
.citadel	Citadel Domain			Yes
.citi	Citigroup			Yes
.citic	CITIC Group		No	Yes
.clubmed	Club Med			Yes
.comcast	Comcast			
.commbank	Commonwealth Bank			Yes
.creditunion	CUNA Performance Resources			Yes
.crown	Crown Equipment Corporation			Yes
.crs	Federated Co-operatives (Co-Operative Retailing System)		Unknown	Yes
.csc	DXC Technology			
.cuisinella	Société Alsacienne de Meubles (Cuisinella)		Unknown	Yes
.dabur	Dabur			Yes
.datsun	Nissan (Datsun)			Yes
.dealer	Dealer Dot Com			Yes
.dell	Dell			Yes
.deloitte	Deloitte			Yes
.delta	Delta Air Lines			Yes
.dhl	Deutsche Post			Yes
.discover	Discover Financial Services			Yes
.dish	Dish Network			Yes
.dnp	Dai Nippon Printing		Unknown	Yes
.dodge	Chrysler (Dodge)			
.dunlop	Goodyear Tire and Rubber Company (Dunlop Tyres)			Yes
.dupont	DuPont			Yes
.dvag	Deutsche Vermögensberatung		Unknown	Yes
.edeka	Edeka		Unknown	Yes
.emerck	Merck Group		Unknown	Yes
.epson	Seiko Epson			Yes
.ericsson	Ericsson			Yes
.erni	ERNI Group Holding AG			Yes
.esurance	Esurance			
.etisalat	Etisalat			
.eurovision	European Broadcasting Union (Eurovision)			Yes
.everbank	EverBank		Unknown	
.extraspace	Extra Space Storage			Yes
.fage	Fage			Yes
.fairwinds	FairWinds Partners			Yes
.farmers	Farmers Insurance Exchange			Yes
.fedex	FedEx			Yes
.ferrari	Stellantis (Ferrari)	IANA lists FCA; which merged into Stellantis in 2021		Yes
.ferrero	Ferrero			Yes
.fiat	Stellantis (Fiat)	IANA lists FCA; which merged into Stellantis in 2021		
.fidelity	Fidelity Investments			Yes
.firestone	Bridgestone			Yes
.firmdale	Firmdale Holdings		Unknown	Yes
.flickr	Yahoo! (Flickr)			Yes
.flir	FLIR Systems			Yes
.flsmidth	FLSmidth		Unknown	
.ford	Ford			Yes
.fox	FOX Registry, LLC			Yes
.fresenius	Fresenius Immobilien-Verwaltungs-GmbH			Yes
.frogans	OP3FT	Solely for use by the Frogans technology	Yes	Yes
.frontier	Frontier Communications			Yes
.fujitsu	Fujitsu			Yes
.fujixerox	Fuji Xerox			
.gallo	E & J Gallo Winery			Yes
.gallup	Gallup			Yes
.gap	Gap			Yes
.gbiz	Google		Unknown	Yes
.gea	GEA Group			Yes
.genting	Genting Group			Yes
.giving	Public Interest Registry			Yes
.gle	Google		Unknown	Yes
.globo	Grupo Globo		No	Yes
.gmail	Google (Gmail)		Unknown	Yes
.gmo	GMO Internet		Unknown	Yes
.gmx	1&1 Mail & Media (GMX, Global Message Exchange)		Unknown	Yes
.godaddy	Go Daddy			Yes
.goldpoint	Yodobashi Camera			Yes
.goodyear	Goodyear Tire and Rubber Company			Yes
.goog	Google		Unknown	Yes
.google	Google		Unknown	Yes
.grainger	Grainger Registry Services, LLC			Yes
.guardian	Guardian Life Insurance Company of America			
.gucci	Gucci			Yes
.hbo	HBO			Yes
.hdfc	Housing Development Finance Corporation			Yes
.hdfcbank	HDFC Bank			Yes
.hermes	Hermès			Yes
.hisamitsu	Hisamitsu Pharmaceutical			Yes
.hitachi	Hitachi			Yes
.hkt	Hong Kong Telecom			Yes
.homegoods	HomeGoods (The TJX Companies, Inc.)			Yes
.homesense	HomeSense (The TJX Companies, Inc.)			Yes
.honda	Honda			Yes
.honeywell	Honeywell			
.hotmail	Microsoft (Hotmail)			Yes
.hsbc	HSBC		Unknown	Yes
.hughes	Hughes Network Systems			Yes
.hyatt	Hyatt			Yes
.hyundai	Hyundai Motor Company			Yes
.ibm	IBM		Unknown	Yes
.ice	Intercontinental Exchange			Yes
.ieee	Institute of Electrical & Electronics Engineers			Yes
.ifm	ifm electronic gmbh			Yes
.ikano	Ikano			Yes
.imdb	Amazon (IMDb)			Yes
.infiniti	Nissan (Infiniti)			Yes
.intel	Intel			
.intuit	Intuit			Yes
.ipiranga	Ipiranga			Yes
.iselect	iSelect			
.itau	Itaú Unibanco			Yes
.itv	ITV			Yes
.iveco	CNH Industrial (Iveco)			
.jaguar	Jaguar Land Rover			Yes
.java	Oracle (Java)			Yes
.jcb	JCB			Yes
.jcp	JCP Media			
.jeep	Chrysler (Jeep)			Yes
.jio	Reliance Industries (Jio)			Yes
.jpmorgan	JPMorgan Chase			Yes
.juniper	Juniper Networks			Yes
.kddi	KDDI			Yes
.kerryhotels	Kerry Trading Co. Limited			Yes
.kerryproperties	Kerry Trading Co. Limited			Yes
.kfh	Kuwait Finance House			Yes
.kia	Kia Motors Corporation			Yes
.kinder	Ferrero (Kinder Surprise)			
.kindle	Amazon (Kindle)			Yes
.komatsu	Komatsu			Yes
.kpmg	KPMG			Yes
.kred	KredTLD		Unknown	Yes
.kuokgroup	Kerry Trading Co. Limited			Yes
.lacaixa	Caixa d’Estalvis i Pensions de Barcelona		Unknown	Yes
.ladbrokes	Ladbrokes			
.lamborghini	Lamborghini			Yes
.lancaster	Lancaster (Coty)			Yes
.lancia	Stellantis (Lancia)	IANA lists FCA; which merged into Stellantis in 2021		
.lancome	L'Oréal (Lancôme)			
.landrover	Jaguar Land Rover			Yes
.lanxess	Lanxess			Yes
.lasalle	JLL			Yes
.latrobe	La Trobe University		Unknown	Yes
.lds	The Church of Jesus Christ of Latter-day Saints (LDS Church)		Unknown	Yes
.leclerc	E.Leclerc		Yes	
.lego	Lego Group			Yes
.liaison	Liaison Technologies			
.lexus	Toyota (Lexus)			Yes
.lidl	Lidl			Yes
.lifestyle	Lifestyle Domain Holdings, Inc.			Yes
.lilly	Eli Lilly and Company			Yes
.lincoln	Ford (Lincoln)			Yes
.linde	Linde			
.lipsy	Lipsy Ltd			Yes
.lixil	Lixil Group			
.locus	Locus Analytics			Yes
.lotte	Lotte Holdings			Yes
.lpl	LPL Financial			Yes
.lplfinancial	LPL Financial			Yes
.lundbeck	Lundbeck			Yes
.lupin	Lupin Limited			
.macys	Macy's			
.maif	MAIF			Yes
.man	MAN			Yes
.mango	Mango		Latin script	Yes
.marriott	Marriott International			Yes
.maserati	Stellantis (Maserati)	IANA lists FCA; which merged into Stellantis in 2021		
.mattel	Mattel			Yes
.mckinsey	McKinsey & Company			Yes
.metlife	MetLife			
.microsoft	Microsoft			Yes
.mini	BMW (Mini)		No	Yes
.mint	Intuit Mint (Intuit Administrative Services, Inc.)			Yes
.mit	Massachusetts Institute of Technology			Yes
.mitsubishi	Mitsubishi Corporation			Yes
.mlb	MLB Advanced Media			Yes
.mma	MMA IARD			Yes
.monash	Monash University		No	Yes
.mormon	The Church of Jesus Christ of Latter-day Saints (LDS Church)		Unknown	Yes
.moto	Motorola			Yes
.movistar	Telefónica (Movistar)			
.msd	MSD Registry Holdings, Inc.			Yes
.mtn	MTN			Yes
.mtr	MTR Corporation			Yes
.mutual	Northwestern Mutual			
.nadex	Nadex			
.nationwide	Nationwide Mutual Insurance Company			
.natura	Natura & Co			
.nba	National Basketball Association			Yes
.nec	NEC			Yes
.netflix	Netflix			Yes
.neustar	Neustar		No	Yes
.newholland	CNH Industrial (New Holland Agriculture, New Holland Construction)			
.nfl	National Football League			Yes
.nhk	NHK		Unknown	Yes
.nico	Dwango (Niconico)		Unknown	Yes
.nike	Nike			Yes
.nikon	Nikon			Yes
.nissan	Nissan			Yes
.nissay	Nippon Life			Yes
.nokia	Nokia			Yes
.northwesternmutual	Northwestern Mutual			
.norton	NortonLifeLock			Yes
.nra	National Rifle Association of America		Unknown	Yes
.ntt	Nippon Telegraph & Telephone			Yes
.obi	OBI Group Holding SE & Co. KGaA			Yes
.office	Microsoft (Office)			Yes
.omega	Swatch Group (Omega)			Yes
.oracle	Oracle			Yes
.orange	Orange			Yes
.origins	Origins (The Estée Lauder Companies Inc.)			Yes
.otsuka	Otsuka Pharmaceutical		Unknown	Yes
.ovh	OVH		French	Yes
.panasonic	Panasonic			Yes
.pccw	PCCW			Yes
.pfizer	Pfizer			Yes
.philips	Philips			Yes
.piaget	Piaget		Unknown	
.pictet	Pictet			Yes
.ping	Ping			Yes
.pioneer	Pioneer Corporation			Yes
.play	Google (Google Play)			Yes
.playstation	Sony (PlayStation)			Yes
.pohl	Deutsche Vermögensberatung (founder Reinfried Pohl)		Unknown	Yes
.politie	Politie Nederland			Yes
.praxi	Praxi		Unknown	Yes
.prod	Google (products)		Unknown	Yes
.pulley	IdeaPulley			Yes
.progressive	Progressive Corporation			Yes
.pru	Prudential Financial			Yes
.prudential	Prudential Financial			Yes
.pwc	PricewaterhouseCoopers		Unknown	Yes
.quest	Quest Software			Yes
.qvc	QVC			
.redstone	Redstone Haute Couture Co			Yes
.reliance	Reliance Industries			Yes
.rexroth	Robert Bosch GmbH			Yes
.ricoh	Ricoh			Yes
.ril	Reliance Industries			Yes
.rmit	Royal Melbourne Institute of Technology			
.rocher	Ferrero (Ferrero Rocher)			
.rogers	Rogers Communications			Yes
.rwe	RWE			Yes
.safety	Safety Registry Services, LLC.			Yes
.sakura	Sakura Internet			Yes
.samsung	Samsung SDS			Yes
.sandvik	Sandvik			Yes
.sandvikcoromant	Sandvik Coromant		Unknown	Yes
.sanofi	Sanofi			Yes
.sap	SAP			Yes
.saxo	Saxo Bank			Yes
.sbi	State Bank of India			Yes
.sbs	Special Broadcasting Service	Later became a gTLD on 15 June 2021		Yes
.sca	Svenska Cellulosa		Unknown	
.scb	Siam Commercial Bank		Thai	Yes
.schaeffler	Schaeffler Technologies			Yes
.schmidt	Schmidt Groupe		Unknown	Yes
.schwarz	Schwarz Gruppe			Yes
.scjohnson	S. C. Johnson & Son			
.scor	SCOR			
.seat	SEAT			Yes
.sener	Sener Ingeniería y Sistemas, S.A.			Yes
.ses	SES			
.sew	SEW Eurodrive			Yes
.seven	Seven West Media			Yes
.sfr	SFR			Yes
.seek	Seek		No	Yes
.shangrila	Shangri-La Hotels and Resorts			Yes
.sharp	Sharp Corporation			Yes
.shaw	Shaw Cablesystems G.P.			Yes
.shell	Shell			Yes
.shriram	Shriram Capital			
.sina	Sina Corp			Yes
.sky	Sky Group			Yes
.skype	Microsoft (Skype)			Yes
.smart	Smart Communications			Yes
.sncf	SNCF			Yes
.softbank	SoftBank			Yes
.sohu	Sohu		Unknown	Yes
.sony	Sony			Yes
.spiegel	Der Spiegel		Unknown	
.stada	Stada Arzneimittel			Yes
.staples	Staples			Yes
.star	Disney Star			Yes
.starhub	StarHub			
.statebank	State Bank of India			Yes
.statefarm	State Farm			Yes
.statoil	Statoil			
.stc	Saudi Telecom Company			Yes
.stcgroup	Saudi Telecom Company			Yes
.suzuki	Suzuki		Unknown	Yes
.swatch	Swatch Group			Yes
.swiftcover	Swiftcover			
.symantec	Gen Digital			
.taobao	Alibaba Group (Taobao)			Yes
.target	Target			Yes
.tatamotors	Tata Motors			Yes
.tdk	TDK			Yes
.telecity	TelecityGroup			
.telefonica	Telefónica			
.temasek	Temasek Holdings			Yes
.teva	Teva Pharmaceuticals			Yes
.tiffany	Tiffany & Co.			
.tjx	TJX Companies			Yes
.toray	Toray Industries			Yes
.toshiba	Toshiba			Yes
.total	Total			Yes
.toyota	Toyota			Yes
.travelers	Travelers TLD, LLC (The Travelers Companies)			Yes
.travelersinsurance	Travelers TLD, LLC (The Travelers Companies)			Yes
.tui	TUI		Unknown	Yes
.tvs	T V Sundram Iyengar & Sons Private Limited			Yes
.ubs	UBS			Yes
.unicom	China Unicom			Yes
.uol	Universo Online	Delegated to UOL subsidiary UBN Internet.	Unknown	Yes
.ups	United Parcel Service			Yes
.vanguard	Vanguard Group			Yes
.verisign	VeriSign			Yes
.vig	Vienna Insurance Group			Yes
.viking	Viking River Cruises			Yes
.virgin	Virgin Group			Yes
.visa	Visa			Yes
.vista	Vistaprint			
.vistaprint	Vistaprint			
.vivo	Telefônica Brasil			Yes
.volkswagen	Volkswagen Group of America			
.volvo	Volvo			Yes
.walmart	Walmart			Yes
.walter	Sandvik			Yes
.weatherchannel	IBM (The Weather Company)			Yes
.weber	Saint-Gobain			Yes
.weir	Weir			Yes
.williamhill	William Hill		Unknown	Yes
.windows	Microsoft (Windows)			Yes
.wme	Endeavor		Unknown	Yes
.wolterskluwer	Wolters Kluwer			Yes
.woodside	Woodside Energy			Yes
.wtc	World Trade Centers Association		Unknown	Yes
.xbox	Microsoft (Xbox)			Yes
.xerox	Fuji Xerox			Yes
.xfinity	Comcast			
.yahoo	Yahoo!			Yes
.yamaxun	Amazon (Amazon China)			Yes
.yandex	Yandex		Unknown	Yes
.yodobashi	Yodobashi Camera			Yes
.youtube	Google (YouTube)		Unknown	Yes
.zappos	Amazon (Zappos)			Yes
.zara	Inditex (Zara)			Yes
.zippo	Zippo			

== Internationalized brand top-level domains ==
DNS name	IDN TLD	Entity	Script	Transliteration	Comments	DNSSEC
xn--jlq480n2rg	.亚马逊	Amazon	Chinese (Simplified)	Yàmǎxùn		Yes
xn--cckwcxetd	.アマゾン	Amazon	Katakana	amazon		Yes
xn--mgba3a3ejt	.ارامكو	Aramco Services Company	Arabic			
xn--mgbaakc7dvf	.اتصالات	Emirates Telecommunications Corporation (trading as Etisalat)	Arabic			
xn--8y0a063a	.联通	China United Network Communications Corporation Limited	Chinese (Simplified)	Liántōng		
xn--6frz82g	.移动	China Mobile Communications Corporation	Chinese (Simplified)	Yídòng		
xn--fiq64b	.中信	CITIC Group	Chinese	zhōngxìn		Yes
xn--5su34j936bgsg	.香格里拉	Shangri‐La International Hotel Management Limited	Chinese	Xiānggélǐlā		
xn--b4w605ferd	.淡马锡	Temasek Holdings (Private) Limited	Chinese (Simplified)	Dànmǎxī		
xn--3oq18vl8pn36a	.大众汽车	Volkswagen (China) Investment Co., Ltd.	Chinese (Simplified)	Dàzhòngqìchē		
xn--vermgensberater-ctb	.vermögensberater	Deutsche Vermögensberatung Aktiengesellschaft	Latin			Yes
xn--vermgensberatung-pwb	.vermögensberatung	Deutsche Vermögensberatung Aktiengesellschaft	Latin			Yes
xn--qcka1pmc	.グーグル	Google	Katakana	gūguru		Yes
xn--flw351e	.谷歌	Google	Chinese	gǔgē		Yes
xn--estv75g	.工行	Industrial and Commercial Bank of China Limited	Chinese	Gōngháng		
xn--w4rs40l	.嘉里	Kerry Trading Co. Limited	Chinese	Jiālǐ		
xn--w4r85el8fhu5dnra	.嘉里大酒店	Kerry Trading Co. Limited	Chinese	Jiālǐdàjiǔdiàn		
xn--kcrx77d1x4a	.飞利浦	Koninklijke Philips N.V.	Chinese (Simplified)	Fēilìpǔ		
xn--jlq61u9w7b	.诺基亚	Nokia Corporation	Chinese (Simplified)	Nuòjīyà		
xn--fzys8d69uvgm	.電訊盈科	PCCW Enterprises Limited	Chinese (Traditional)	din6 soen3 jing4 fo1		
xn--cg4bki	.삼성	Samsung	Hangul	samseong		Yes

== Special-use domains ==
ICANN/IANA has created some special-use domain names which are meant for technical purposes. ICANN/IANA owns all of the special-use domain names.

DNS name	Notes	IDN
.example	Not installed as a domain name, but usable in text as an example. (example.com, example.net, and example.org are also reserved for this purpose but are active sites.)	Unknown
.internal	Not installed as a domain name, but usable in private and internal networks.	Unknown
.invalid	Not installed as a domain name, but usable in testing as a domain which wouldn't work.	Unknown
.local	Local network. Must be used with multicast DNS (mDNS).	Unknown
.onion	Connection to the Tor network.	Unknown
.test	Meant for testing DNS software.	Unknown

== Non-IANA domains ==
Besides the TLDs managed (or at least tracked) by IANA or ICANN, other independent groups have created, or had attempted to create, their own TLDs with varying technical specifications, functions, and outcomes.

=== Microsoft Windows ===
Within Microsoft Windows there are some special purpose domain names that partially conflict with publicly assigned ones.

DNS name	Still used	Conflicting IANA domain registration	Purpose
.ipv6-literal.net	Yes	Registered by an independent 3rd party (as of writing). Microsoft gave up the domain in January 2014. In addition Microsoft also never requested it to become an ICANN/IANA owned special-use domain name.	A special-use domain primarily for representing IPv6 addresses in UNC paths as ":" is a reserved character in Windows. Usage is not restricted to UNC paths. Compared to ip6.arpa reverse lookup domains it will return an IPv6 address but without generating any DNS queries.

=== Internet Engineering Task Force proposals for local TLDs ===
The Internet Engineering Task Force (IETF) has submitted several requests for comments on TLDs that could be used to represent local devices and services.

DNS name	RFC	Notes
.home.arpa	RFC 8375	A special-use domain for non-unique use in residential home networks.
.internal	RFC 6762 Appendix G	ICANN has registered this top-level domain for private use.
.intranet	RFC 6762 Appendix G	The IETF does not recommend use of unregistered top-level domains at all, but should network operators decide to do this, the following top-level domains have been used on private internal networks without the problems caused by trying to reuse ".local" for this purpose.
.private	RFC 6762 Appendix G	The IETF does not recommend use of unregistered top-level domains at all, but should network operators decide to do this, the following top-level domains have been used on private internal networks without the problems caused by trying to reuse ".local" for this purpose.
.corp	RFC 6762 Appendix G	Mentioned by ICANN for causing a name collision.
.home	RFC 6762 Appendix G	Mentioned by ICANN for causing a name collision.
.lan	RFC 6762 Appendix G	Many routers automatically append ".lan" to local device hostnames, including those that use OpenWrt.

=== Blockchain-registered ===
Blockchain-based domains are registered and exchanged using a public blockchain like Ethereum. Oftentimes, these domains serve specific functions such as creating human-readable references to smart contract addresses used in DApps or personal wallet addresses. Generally, these non-standard domains are unreachable through the normal DNS resolution process and instead require clients to use some sort of transparent web proxy or gateway to access them

DNS name	Blockchain	Notes
.agt	Polygon	The .agt (agent) TLD is a decentralized top-level domain operating within the Web3 ecosystem, primarily positioned as an identifier for AI agents and autonomous systems. The TLD is offered by Web3 domain providers, such as Freename, an ICANN-accredited registrar that bridges traditional DNS with blockchain technology. .agt domains can be minted as NFTs across multiple blockchains (Polygon, Solana, BNBChain, BASE, Aurora, Sei, Abstract, Chiliz, and Etherlink), eliminating traditional renewal fees and providing registrants lifetime ownership. Popular .agt domains function as human-readable aliases for AI agents, agentic and tool-calling functions, cryptocurrency wallets, decentralized digital identities, AI agent ID, and addresses for hosting decentralized websites.
N/A	Handshake	Handshake is both an alternative DNS root zone and a domain name-centric blockchain meant for managing TLDs in a decentralized way which allows virtually any domain to be registered as a TLD by end users. The project intends to be a more resilient and distributed implementation of the global root zone without needing a centralized organization, like ICANN, to manage or operate it. However, it doesn't aim to outright replace the existing root zone, as it reserves all existing TLDs so that a query for wikipedia.org, for example, that is sent to a Handshake node can be redirected to the traditional root.
.eth	Ethereum	Domains under the .eth TLD are primarily used as human-readable aliases to Ethereum wallet addresses, rather than IP addresses, though some efforts into expanding the use of .eth into the traditional DNS space have been made.
.crypto	Ethereum	.crypto aims to make cryptocurrency wallet address resolution easier, with the exception that, unlike the other examples mentioned here, the TLD is the product of a for-profit company, Unstoppable Domains, that markets the domain as an alternative DNS root despite being entirely dependent on the traditional root zone.
.bit	Namecoin	Namecoin's .bit TLD technically operates as a single-domain DNS root, though has historically peered with the OpenNIC root zone to provide greater accessibility. The popularity and usage of .bit domains is much lower than the other projects mentioned, despite it being the earliest example. This is primarily due to the negative reputation Namecoin has garnered after .bit domains became popular for sharing and distributing illegal or illicit content such as malware, which ultimately prompted OpenNIC to end its peering agreement and stop serving the TLD in its root zone in 2018.
.anon .btn .conf .index .merch .mirror .mob .screen .srv .ygg	Alfis	.anon and .ygg are bound to have IP-addresses from Yggdrasil Network only.
.ton	TON	Domains under the .ton TLD are part of TON DNS, a decentralized naming system on The Open Network blockchain. They function as human-readable aliases for cryptocurrency wallets, smart contracts, and decentralized websites (TON Sites). These domains are minted as NFTs, giving users full ownership, and are integrated into the TON ecosystem, including messaging apps like Telegram.

=== Alternate roots ===
In the case of alternative DNS roots, organizations or projects make use of the same mechanisms of the DNS but instead take on the role of ICANN in managing and administering an entirely separate root zone, thus having the ability to create new TLDs independently. However, this doesn't make these domains any less isolated from the rest of the internet, as the ability for clients to resolve them theoretically only requires switching to a recursive DNS resolver that recognizes and serves records underneath the alternate root zone.

DNS name	Root	Notes
N/A	Handshake	The list of registered TLDs on the Handshake blockchain is too large and dynamic to enumerate here.
.bbs .chan .cyb .dyn .geek .gopher .indy .libre .neo .null .o .oss .oz .parody .pirate	OpenNIC	
.fur	FurNIC	
.lib .coin .emc .bazar	Emercoin	
.ku .te .ti .uu .ko .rm	New Nations	
.b32.i2p .i2p.alt .i2p	I2P	GANA (GNUnet Assigned Numbers Authority) registered Domains for the I2P Network.

== See also ==
- Top-level domain
- Country code top-level domain
- Generic top-level domain
- Pseudo-top-level domain
- IDN Test TLDs
- ISO 3166-1 alpha-2, the standard for two-letter country codes, which most ccTLDs are based on
- Proposed top-level domain
- Second-level domain, information about .co.jp, .co.uk, .co.kr, .co.nf, etc.
- Public Suffix List
