= Geographic top-level domain =

Internet domain suffix linked to places

A geographic top-level domain (often shortened as geographic TLD or geoTLD) is any of an unofficial group of top-level domains in the Domain Name System of the Internet using the name of or invoking an association with a geographical, geopolitical, ethnic, linguistic or cultural community. The IANA does not recognize these domains as their own group within the Root Zone Database, rather classifying them as generic top-level domains.

As of 2026, several examples of geographic TLDs exist: .london, enabling London businesses, organizations, and individuals to establish an online naming presence, .asia (for Asia), .rio (for Rio de Janeiro city), .quebec (for Québec province), .cat which is a sponsored top-level domain intended to be used to highlight the Catalan language and culture. .eu is a country code top-level domain, since "EU" is a reserved country code for the European Union in ISO 3166-1.

In 2017, an interest group focused on geographic TLDs was formed and joined as a member of the Registry Stakeholder Group (RySG) at ICANN. The GeoTLD Group AISBL is an international non-for-profit membership association resident in Belgium. It represents and promotes the interests of organizations operating a generic top-level domain which denominates a geographic name, geographic identifier or geographic origin (so-called GeoTLD) with the purpose of serving the respective place, language and culture on the internet.

== Proposals ==
Examples of proposed top-level domains in this category are:

- .αθήνα (Athens, Greece)
- .bali (island of Bali, Indonesia)
- .berlin (city of Berlin, Germany)
- .wien (city of Vienna, Austria)
- .bcn (city of Barcelona)
- .bzh (Breton community)
- .cym (Wales (Cymru); awarded to the Cayman Islands)
- .cymru (Wales (Cymru))
- .wales (Wales)
- .eus (Basque language)
- .gal (Galician language)
- .saarland (the German state of Saarland)
- .africa (African and Pan African communities)
- .vlaanderen (Flanders, Belgium)
- .上海 (Shanghai)
- .ln and .le - Currently being sold by Dennis Hope's "Lunar Embassy Commission" alongside .lunar, .moon, .venus, .mars, .jupiter, .saturn, .uranus, .neptune, .pluto, .space. People who purchase novelty deeds for outer space property from him are also given free domains. None of these TLDs are supported by the root servers and it is unlikely they will be in the future (Although, with the ICANN decision to allow registration of custom gTLDs, it becomes possible).
- .toronto (Toronto)

== Applications ==
On June 13, 2012 ICANN revealed nearly 2,000 applications for new top-level domains, which were expected to go live throughout 2014 after thorough examination.

Many of these are geographic, including:

- .africa
- .alsace
- .amsterdam .amsterdam
- .bar (intended for Bar, Montenegro)
- .barcelona
- .bayern
- .bcn (for Barcelona)
- .berlin .berlin
- .brussels .brussels
- .budapest
- .bzh (for Brittany)
- .catalonia
- .corsica .corsica
- .cymru (for Wales, in Welsh)
- .doha
- .durban
- .hamburg .hamburg
- .helsinki
- .istanbul
- .kiwi (for New Zealand)
- .koeln (for Cologne)
- .kyoto
- .lat (for Latin America)
- .london
- .madrid
- .melbourne .melbourne
- .miami
- .moscow
- .nagoya
- .nrw (for North Rhine-Westphalia)
- .nyc (for New York City)
- .osaka
- .paris
- .persiangulf
- .quebec (for quebec)
- .rio (for Rio de Janeiro)
- .roma
- .saarland
- .scot
- .stockholm
- .sydney
- .taipei
- .thai
- .tirol
- .tokyo
- .vegas .vegas
- .wales (for Wales, in English)
- .wien (for Vienna, Austria)
- .vlaanderen (.vlaanderen for Flanders)
- .yokohama
- .zuerich
- .zulu
- .москва (for Moscow)
- .ابوظبي (for Abu Dhabi)
- .佛山 (for Foshan)
- .广州 (for Guangzhou)
- .深圳 (for Shenzhen)

== Internationalized country codes ==
An internationalized country code is similar to a GeoTLD, with two differences: it is a domain used exclusively for a sovereign state. The other difference is that an internationalized country code is considered a ccTLD and not a GeoTLD.

== See also ==
- Generic top-level domain (gTLD)
- Country code top-level domain (ccTLD)
- Internationalized domain name
