= .es =

Top-level Internet domain for Spain

- Introduced: 14 April 1988; 38 years ago
- TLD type: Country code top-level domain
- Status: Active
- Registry: Red.es
- Sponsor: Red.es
- Intended use: Entities connected with Spain
- Actual use: Very popular in Spain. Also, used for domain hacks in multiple languages.
- Registered domains: 2,134,104 (2025-07-31)
- Registration restrictions: None for second-level registrations after 2005 phase-in of open registration; there are restrictions on some of the specific subdomains
- Structure: Registrations are taken directly at the second level or at the third level beneath various second-level subdomains
- Documents: Spanish domain-related legislation
- Dispute policies: Extrajuridical conflict resolution system for ".es" domain names
- Registry website: dominios.es

.es is the country code top-level domain (ccTLD) for Spain administered by the Network Information Centre of Spain.

== Server ==
The .es domain does not have a conventional WHOIS server operating on port 43, but WHOIS queries can be made using a page on ESNIC's website.

== Registration ==
Registrations are permitted at the second level or at the third level beneath various generic second level categories.

Some qualifications and restrictions apply to third-level registrations depending on which second-level domain they are within.

Second-level registrations have had some limitations including requiring registrants to have a connection with Spain, but these restrictions were lifted in a multi-stage process completed by the end of 2005, at which point registrations at the second level of .es were open to anybody worldwide.

Until the liberalization in November 2005, registering in .es was expensive and encumbered compared to other ccTLDs.

The second-level word had to be either a trade mark valid in Spain, the exact name of the registering business or association, or the first name and at least the first surname of the registering individual.

Common words and placenames were unregisterable.

There was also a requirement of a minimum of three characters in the name, though some exceptions like hp.es (Hewlett-Packard Spain) and pp.es (People's Party) were allowed.

== Second-level domains ==
There are a number of second-level domains:

Domain	Status	Intended users
.com.es	Open	Commercial entities
.nom.es	Open	Personal entitles
.org.es	Open	Noncommercial organizations
.gob.es	Restricted	Government
.edu.es	Restricted	Educational institutions

=== Alternatives ===
As an alternative, many Spanish organizations registered under .com, .org or .net. While being generic top-level domains, organisations may also use one or more other regional variants below:

Domain	Region	Related language	Related culture
.cat	Catalonia	Catalan	Catalan culture
.bcn	Barcelona	Catalan	Catalan culture
.eus	Basque Country	Basque	Basque culture
.gal	Galicia	Galician	Galician culture

== Domain hacks ==
Although very popular in Spain for its intended use, .es has been used for domain hacks such as geociti.es, a website mirroring GeoCities; adspac.es, a mobile-based advertising firm; thelettervsixtim.es, for the game VVVVVV; and iTun.es for iTunes Ping URL shortening.
