= .quebec =

Internet top-level domain

- Introduced: April 16, 2014
- TLD type: GeoTLD
- Status: Active
- Intended use: Promotion of businesses, culture, tourism, and identity of Quebec
- DNSSEC: No
- Registry website: registre.quebec

The .quebec domain is a GeoTLD and Community Priority Application that was proposed to ICANN's New gTLD Program by PointQuébec.

== Origin ==
PointQuébec is a non-profit organisation aiming to improve the businesses, culture, tourism, and online identity of Quebec and the Québécois through the .quebec TLD.

According to the PointQuébec organisation, .quebec will allow all Québécois to register their domain names under .quebec.

Michel Philibert, a spokesman for PointQuebec, stated,

"We have our own culture, and we have our own way of doing things, and we want to also affirm our presence on the web".

== History ==
PointQuébec's application for the GeoTLD was approved, and was delegated to the Root Zone on April 16, 2014.

The application was supported by the National Assembly of Quebec and other cultural, technical, and economic institutions in the province. The application received support from all political parties in the legislature.

It received "substantial financial support from the Government of Quebec", including a $185,000 loan, and is a not-for profit organisation. The organisation verified legitimate registrations via statements of intent through a post-verification registration system.

On December 19, 2013, PointQuébec received a registry agreement signed by ICANN for .quebec after passing all the required processes needed to become a registry operator for the string.

.quebec was delegated to the Root Zone of the DNS on April 16, 2014, completing the successful application for the string.

.quebec officially launched on November 18, 2014.

Along with TLDs such as .africa, .cat, .paris, .quebec and other new TLDs fall into the new category of GeoTLDs. The issue of new top level domains in general and .quebec in particular has been discussed at various ICANN meetings since 2005.

== See also ==
- List of Internet top-level domains
- Top-level domain
- Internet in Canada
- .ca
- .qc.ca
