= .yokohama =

Generic top-level Internet domain

- Introduced: 5 June 2014; 11 years ago
- TLD type: Generic top-level domain (gTLD)
- Status: available
- Registry: GMO Internet Group, Inc.
- Sponsor: Yokohama City
- Intended use: Yokohama residents, institutions, and businesses
- DNSSEC: Yes
- Registry website: hello.yokohama

.yokohama is the Internet Generic top-level domain for Yokohama, Japan. It was introduced on 5 June 2014 when ICANN and GMO Internet signed the registry agreement for GMO Registry (which also operates the .tokyo and .nagoya domains) to operate the domain.

Like other generic top-level domains, .yokohama is not geographically restricted to those living in Yokohama.

== See also ==
- .tokyo
- .nagoya
- .jp
