= .amsterdam =

Internet top-level domain for Amsterdam, NL

- Introduced: 2014
- TLD type: GeoTLD
- Status: Active
- Registry: ICANN
- Intended use: Entities connected with Amsterdam
- Registered domains: 27000 (May 2016)
- Registration restrictions: None
- Structure: Registrations are taken directly at the second level
- DNSSEC: Yes
- Registry website: nic.amsterdam

.amsterdam is a top-level domain in the city of Amsterdam. ICANN gave the City of Amsterdam permission to operate the domain on 24 July 2014 as a part of its new gTLD programme. The public has been able to register .amsterdam web addresses since September 2017. Usage of the TLD has been very limited and its introduction has been criticised for its lack of cost-effectiveness. In 2019, the number of domains registered under the TLD decreased by 9.1%. Registration Data Access Protocol was enabled for .amsterdam domains in July 2018.

== See also ==
- .nl
- .frl
- .paris
- .london
