= .gi =

Internet country code top-level domain for Gibraltar

- Introduced: 5 December 1995
- TLD type: Country code top-level domain
- Status: Active
- Registry: GibNet
- Sponsor: GibNet
- Intended use: Entities connected with Gibraltar
- Actual use: Used in Gibraltar and by the local government in Girona, Spain
- Registration restrictions: 2nd level names limited to Gibraltar companies and organizations; various rules for third-level names
- Structure: Registrations are made directly at the second level or at the third level beneath some second-level labels
- Documents: Terms & Conditions
- Dispute policies: Dispute policy
- DNSSEC: yes
- Registry website: nic.gi

.gi is the country code top-level domain (ccTLD) for Gibraltar, a British Overseas Territory. It was created on 5 December 1995.

== Second-level domain names ==
Domain	Intended purpose
.com.gi	Commercial organisations
.ltd.gi	Registered public or private limited companies
.gov.gi	Gibraltar government departments, bodies, and associated government-funded organisations
.mod.gi	Gibraltar Ministry of Defence departments
.edu.gi	Education departments
.org.gi	Non-commercial organisations

== Use in Girona ==
It has been used for some official domains for the Spanish city of Girona due to its coincidence in abbreviation.

This limited use began prior to the creation of the .cat TLD because of Catalan reluctance to use domains under the Spanish country code TLD .es.

Subsequent rules changes prevent new 2nd level registrations directly under .gi for entities not connected with Gibraltar.
