= PYC =

PYC or pyc may refer to:

- .pyc, filename extension for Python (programming language)
- Shatin Pui Ying College, in Sha Tin, Hong Kong
- A US Navy hull classification symbol: Patrol yacht, coastal (PYc)
- PYC, the National Rail station code for Pontyclun railway station, Rhondda Cynon Taf, Wales

== See also ==
- Rus (disambiguation) (Cyrillic: рус)
- .рус Russian Internet TLD
- Pyrolytic carbon
