= .java =

.java may refer to:

- The file extension of software source files in the Java programming language
- The .java top-level domain
