= .band =

.band may refer to:

- .band, a generic Internet top-level domain
- .band, the file format for GarageBand projects
