= BZH =

BZH may refer to:

- BZH, the short form for Breizh, Brittany in Breton language,
- .bzh, an internet domain for the Breton culture and languages

BZH means also in aviation code :

- Brit Air (France)
- Naberezhnye Chelny in Tatarstan (Russia)
