= .istanbul =

Internet top-level domain

- Introduced: 29 May 2015
- TLD type: GeoTLD
- Status: delegated
- Registry: Istanbul Metropolitan Municipality
- Sponsor: MEDYA A.Ş.
- Intended use: Entities associated with Istanbul
- Actual use: Active as of January 27, 2016
- Structure: Registrations are being taken directly at second level
- Documents: ICANN registry agreement
- Dispute policies: UDRP
- DNSSEC: Yes
- Registry website: .istanbul

.istanbul and .ist are approved top level domains (TLD) for the Internet. It is a community-based sponsored top-level domain by Istanbul Metropolitan Municipality and subsidiary Medya A.Ş. According to the Medya A.Ş., .istanbul will improve awareness on Istanbul's historical heritage and help economic growth by allowing unlimited and open registration of the names.

Along with TLDs such as .cat and .asia, .istanbul and other new TLDs fall into the new category of GeoTLDs.

== See also ==
- .tr
