= .amazon =

Internet top-level domain

- Introduced: May 2019; 7 years ago
- Registry: Amazon.com Inc.
- Intended use: Amazon's products
- Registration restrictions: .amazon domains can only be registered by Amazon's employees
- Registry website: registry.amazon

.amazon is a brand top-level domain operated by the e-commerce company Amazon, granted to them in May 2019.

== History ==
Amazon.com applied for the domain name extension in 2012, and the application was granted. However, that decision was overturned after Peru and Brazil objected. Their objection was supported by the Governmental Advisory Committee, a group representing governments within the Internet Corporation for Assigned Names and Numbers (ICANN), which recommended in 2013 against allowing Amazon.com's application to proceed.

Bolivia, Brazil, Colombia, Ecuador, Guyana, Peru, Suriname, and Venezuela (all members of the Amazon Cooperation Treaty Organization) opposed the proposal because it could harm their countries' interests. Instead, they proposed that the nations and the company share governance of the domain.

ICANN directed the disputing parties to negotiate a resolution. While the nations wished to receive specific domains under the top-level domain, Amazon proposed giving each nation a second-level domain based on their country code. According to ICANN meeting notes, "the name Amazon, in any language, is part of the cultural heritage and identity of the Amazon countries, and that its use as a first level domain name unless otherwise agreed by the Amazon countries, shall be reserved for the promotion of the interests and rights of the Amazon peoples and their inclusion in the information society."

In 2017, an Independent Review Process panel ruled in favor of Amazon.com. Subsequent negotiations stalled, and in December 2019, ICANN signed an agreement with Amazon.com.
