= NIC México =

NIC Mexico
- Company type: Non-profit Organization
- Industry: Domain registration
- Founded: February 1989
- Headquarters: Monterrey, Mexico
- Products: registration in .mx, IP Address allocation
- Website: https://www.nicmexico.mx

NIC México (Network Information Centre Mexico) or NIC.MX is the non-profit organization in charge of the registry for the .mx country code top-level domain (ccTLD). NIC México is also responsible for the National Internet Registry which manages the allocation of IP address space to Mexican internet service providers.

== History ==
NIC México was created in February 1989 when the Monterrey Institute of Technology and Higher Education received the .mx delegation.

In 2001 NIC México established the external Advisory Committee with the aim to discuss relevant and strategic issues regarding the .MX policies.

== Registrars ==
NIC Mexico finished its Extensible Provisioning Protocol (EPP) implementation in July 2008 and started the accreditation of domain name registrars for the commercialization of .mx domain names. A list of current accredited .mx registrars show more than 180 after one year of operation of this model.

== International ==
NIC México is a founding member of LACNIC and LACTLD. NIC México is member of the Country Code Names Supporting Organization ccNSO, which is part of the ICANN structure.

Along with eCOM-LAC (Federation of Latin-America and the Caribbean for the Internet and Electronic Commerce), NIC México proposed .lat as a generic top-level domain (gTLD) for Latin American communities, which was approved in 2015.

== See also ==
- .mx
- LACNIC
