= .bcn =

Internet top-level domain

- Introduced: 4 June 2015
- TLD type: GeoTLD
- Status: Delegated
- Registry: Accent Obert, CoreNIC
- Intended use: Barcelona city government

.barcelona
- Introduced: 4 June 2015
- TLD type: GeoTLD
- Status: Delegated
- Registry: Accent Obert, CoreNIC
- Intended use: Barcelona residents
- Documents: Registration policy
- Registry website: www.domini.barcelona

.bcn is a generic top-level domain for the city of Barcelona, Catalonia, Spain.

According to the Barcelona City Council, the .bcn domain is intended to maintain a relationship of "cooperation and sum of efforts" with the .cat domain, even though the proposal has already received the criticisms of the Generalitat de Catalunya and of several personalities from the cultural and technological world of Catalonia.

Another generic top-level domain for Barcelona is .barcelona.

== See also ==
- .cat
