= Registry.Africa =

Top-level domain registry in Africa

Africa Organisation
- Type: International organisation
- Industry: Domain registry
- Founded: 2025
- Website: registry.africa

Registry.Africa was created in 2017 to manage the .africa top-level domain.

== History ==
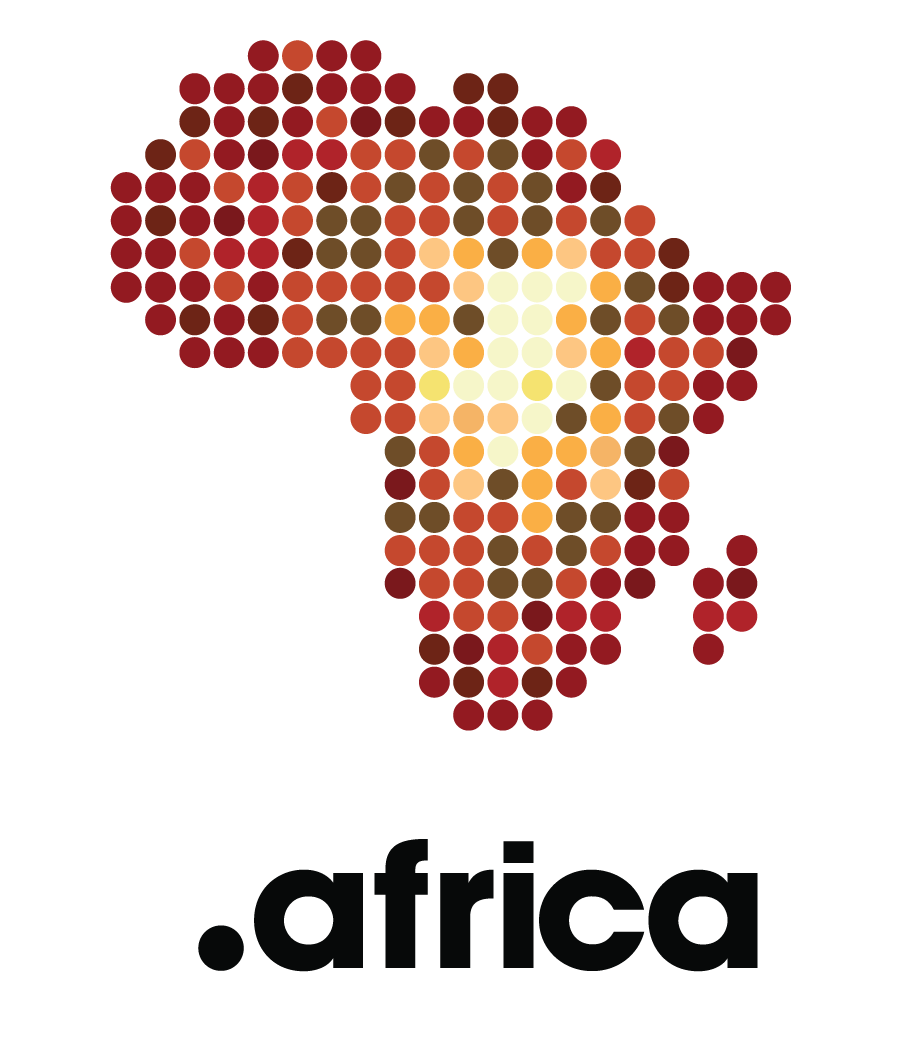
Registry Africa logo

.africa was launched at the African Union Commission in 2017. In 2012 the application process for a new top level domain was launched by ICANN. The Registry Agreement was signed on 26 March 2014 in Singapore.

The application for .africa was endorsed and supported by the African Union and the official launch took place at the Africa Union Commission Headquarters on 3 July 2017 during the 29th African Union (AU) Summit.

== African Regional Support ==
.africa's Africa Regional Support includes African Union Commission (AUC), AfriNIC, AfTLD, ITU, UNECA and Nepad.
