= .berlin =

Internet top-level domain

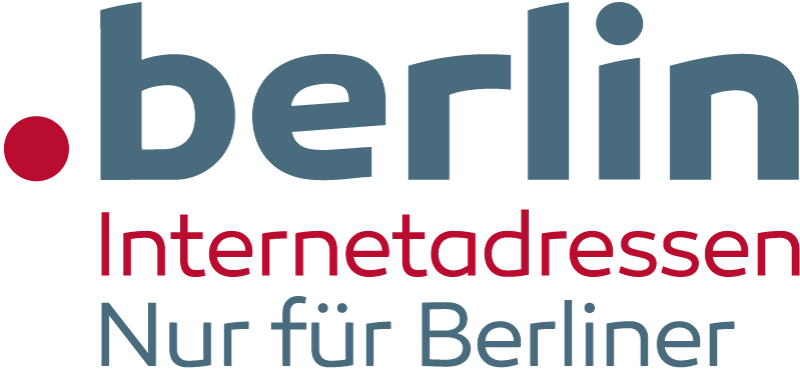
- Introduced: March 18, 2014
- TLD type: GeoTLD
- Status: Delegated
- Registry: dotBERLIN GmbH & Co. KG
- Sponsor: dotBERLIN GmbH & Co. KG
- Intended use: Citizens, companies, and institutions of Berlin
- Registration restrictions: Policies
- Structure: Registrations are being taken directly at second level
- Documents: ICANN registry agreement
- Dispute policies: UDRP
- DNSSEC: Yes
- Registry website: dotBERLIN

.berlin (dotBERLIN) is an approved top-level domain (TLD) for the Internet. It is a community-based sponsored top-level domain for Berliners. According to the dotBERLIN Organization, .berlin will allow all Berliners to register their domains under .berlin

Along with TLDs such as .cat and .asia, .berlin and other new TLDs fall into the new category of GeoTLDs. The issue of new top level domains in general and .berlin in particular has been discussed at various ICANN-Meetings since 2005.

A statement by proponents of the .berlin proposal reads thus:

.berlin is the independent top-level domain of the community of Berliners (on) the Internet. The local addresses available with this are concise and create an identity for citizens, companies, and institutions. Those providing and looking for information, goods, and services can thus intuitively come together. The .berlin domains strengthen the feeling of community amongst Berliners, improve communication, and make interaction easier, thus providing a stimulus for innovation and development. Both for Berliners and for non-Berliners, places called Berlin become more attractive as a place to visit, as a commercial location and as a place to live.

On July 9, 2009, dotBERLIN managing director Dirk Krischenowski filed an application for a City Top-Level Domain Constituency, an interest group at ICANN. This interest group was the precursor of the Brussels-based GeoTLD Group AISBL, that was formed in September 2016 and whose mission is to "Promoting Digital Identities for Cities, Regions, Language and Culture on the Internet".

On October 31, 2013, dotBERLIN GmbH & Co. KG signed a registry agreement with ICANN for .berlin. The .berlin domain officially launched on March 18, 2014. As of March 2017, more than 59,000 sites have been registered under the domain.

In October 2018, dotBERLIN founded the nonprofit initiative Kiezhelden to support the local dealers. "Kiez" – that is a German word that refers to a city neighborhood, a relatively small community within a larger town. The second part of Kiezhelden, the word "Helden", is the German word for "heroes". Kiezhelden.berlin aims to strengthen the small boutiques, handicraft shops, restaurants, cafés, and local service providers in Berlin's neighborhoods in order to help the neighborhoods to remain as colorful and vibrant as they are.

== See also ==
- .de
