= .lat =

Internet top-level domain for Latin America

- Introduced: 9 January 2015
- TLD type: GeoTLD
- Status: Active
- Registry: XYZ LLC
- Intended use: The region of Latin America
- Registration restrictions: None
- Structure: [name].lat
- Registry website: www.nic.lat

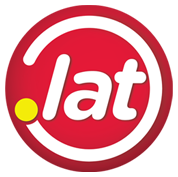
Initial logo, used until 2022

.lat is an Internet generic top-level domain (gTLD) for Latin American communities and users wherever they may reside.

The eCOM-LAC (Federation of Latin-America and the Caribbean for the Internet and Electronic Commerce) appointed NIC México, manager of the .mx ccTLD, its partner regarding a gTLD such as this. The full proposal was originally supposed to be presented to Internet Corporation for Assigned Names and Numbers (ICANN) during 2008 but was later to be presented by mid-2011.

There were initial communications that presented the idea of this new top-level domain as a regional one but further news detailed the community orientation of the proposal. Other names that were being considered are .latin and .latino. Similar proposals had already been approved like the Asian gTLD (.asia) and the European Union's ccTLD (.eu).

It was approved in 2015.

In late 2022, the domain was acquired by XYZ LLC, based in Santa Monica, California.
