= .krd =

Internet top-level domain for Kurdish people

- Introduced: 2014
- TLD type: Generic top-level domain
- Status: Active
- Registry: GoDaddy Registry
- Sponsor: Kurdistan Regional Government
- Intended use: Kurdish people, institutions and businesses
- Structure: General registrations made at the second level; third-level registrations under .edu.krd, .gov.krd, .co.krd possible with some restrictions
- Documents: Registration policy
- Dispute policies: UDRP
- DNSSEC: Yes
- Registry website: dot.krd nic.krd

.krd is the Internet geographic top-level domain (gTLD) for Kurdistan Region of Iraq.

On 5 December 2013, the Department of Information Technology of the Kurdistan Region received a registry agreement signed by ICANN for .krd after passing all the required processes needed to become the registry operator for the domain.
