= Internet Empowerment Resolution =

The Internet Empowerment Resolution was passed by Queens Community Board 3, a local governance unit of the City of New York, on April 19, 2001. The Resolution called for the acquisition of the .nyc Top Level Domain, or TLD, and for its development as a public interest resource to serve the residents and organizations of New York City. During testimony before the city council on October 17, 2008, Connecting.nyc Inc., an advocacy organization for the city's development of the .nyc TLD as a public interest resource, identified the Internet Empowerment Resolution as the origin of its existence.

The Resolution declared that "having a Top Level Domain name for our city will put us on par with other global cities that have Top Level Domain names: Singapore (.SG), Hong Kong (.HK), the Vatican (.VA), and Los Angeles (.LA) - note: Los Angeles uses the domain name originally issued to Laos. ... Having a .NYC TLD will make our community more governable, provide opportunities for small businesses, raise city revenue, and make navigating the Internet easier for our residents, prospective tourists, and businesses."

The Resolution was the first instance of a local government calling for the development of a TLD as a public interest resource. Since its passage, cities have increasingly begun to look upon TLDs as an important part of their digital infrastructure with Barcelona, Berlin, Istanbul, London, New York, Paris, Tokyo and two dozen other cities applying for Top Level Domains.
