= Dot Chinese Website =

Generic top-level domain (.中文网)

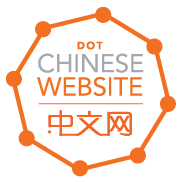
Logo of the domain

The domain name Dot Chinese Website (.中文网) is a new generic top-level domain (gTLD) in the Domain Name System (DNS) of the Internet. Dot Chinese Website is among many listed top level domains. Created along with the partner domain name Dot Chinese Online (.在线) by TLD Registry through Internet Corporation for Assigned Numbers and Names (ICANN)’s new gTLD program launched in April 28, 2014. TLD Registry was founded in June 2008 in Finland with the mission to create essential new Chinese TLDs - intended mainly towards a Chinese-speaking audience. Because it is displayed in a simplified Chinese character language specific script, Dot Chinese Website is known as an Internationalized Domain Name (IDNs).

The Chinese used for the domain Dot Chinese Website, "中文网", directly translates to "Chinese Language Website". For Chinese speaking internet users, this communicates a standard phrase they use to find an international website localized into Chinese.

Dot Chinese Website is deemed as a premium domain name, and TLD Registry has sold over $900,000 in premium domain names. It holds the record for the most successful premium domain name auction in the ICANN New gTLD Program. The auction was held in the prestigious private members club of the Galaxy Macau, CHINA ROUGE.

Hundreds of popular brands and corporations such as Nokia, MSN, Reuters, Jay Chou, the NBA, Eminem, CNBC， IMDb, Real Madrid, Samsung, the United Nations, the BBC and various others are using the term 中文网 in their names.

TLD Registry has 52 different accredited partner registrars currently serving the domain name Dot Chinese Website.

Dot Chinese Website (.中文网) along with Dot Chinese Online (.在线) currently hold the highest volume in the world in new IDN gTLD registrations. A feature case study was carried out about the two Chinese IDNs in Section 8.2.5 of the report (page 86).

In the Domain Name Association's (DNA) first official newsletter the State of the Domains", Dot Chinese Online (.在线) and Dot Chinese Website (.中文网) were featured in the "IDN Spotlight" portion. Released in October 2014, at ICANN 51 in Los Angeles, the "State of the Domains" is a comprehensive quarterly report that provides analysis, trends, and case studies of current Internet domains. TLD Registry, is responsible for the design of the newsletter and completed the full-Mandarin edition of the newsletter.

== Registration history ==
The application for Dot Chinese Website domain was submitted to ICANN on April 12, 2013.

Finnish Prime Minister Jyrki Katainen, attended the ICANN signing ceremony of the Formal Registry Agreement (RA) contract in Beijing on September 10, 2013.

On December 3, 2013 in Helsinki, Finland, TLD Registry Ltd, a domain name registry dedicated to Chinese IDNs, announced the launch schedule for two of its domains: Dot Chinese Online and Dot Chinese Website.

According to ICANN regulation and rules, the Dot Chinese Online (.在线) and Dot Chinese Website (.中文网) were introduced to the global internet.

On November 28, Dot Chinese Online and Dot Chinese Website passed ICANN pre-delegation testing, to test for technical integrity. For 60 days, beginning on January 17 - March 17, Dot Chinese Online and Dot Chinese Website went through the trademark-owners only Sunrise period. The second stage, "the Landrush period" occurred on March 20.

Dot Chinese Online and Dot Chinese Website were auctioned off at the Galaxy Macau on Friday, March 21. The Landrush period went on through the weeklong ICANN conference in Singapore (March 23–27) and China's Qing Ming festival (April 4–6), and concluded on Thursday, April 24. A three-day quiet period immediately followed. General availability of domain names Dot Chinese Online and Dot Chinese Website began on Monday April 28, 2014.

The Landrush event incited the Chinese government, which purchased close to 20,000 IDNs. The Chinese government also announced that the Ministry of Industry and Information Technology of the People's Republic of China (MIIT) has made it mandatory for all Chinese government-run websites to make the change to exclusively Chinese-specific domain names.

== Security ==
It is difficult for Chinese netizens to identify phishing attacks in a complete English URL due to language barriers. Therefore, Chinese IDNs provide a source of protection for Chinese consumers against phishing attacks. Chinese netizens (and the Chinese government) tend to favor fully Chinese web addresses because they are more easily able to spot phishing URLs in their own language.

== See also ==
- .cn, the official ccTLD for China
