= .stockholm =

Internet top-level domain for Stockholm, Sweden

.stockholm is a top-level domain (TLD) and GeoTLD for Stockholm, the capital of Sweden. Stockholm Municipality applied for the TLD in 2012, at a cost of approximately 1.3 million SEK. It was approved by ICANN as a TLD on 17 September 2015 and delegated on 25 September 2015.

The address was taken in use by the town in 2016 but appeared for the first time on the web in 2018. It is meant to be used for the town's own activities and is not available for public use. It is currently used by around 70 websites.
