= .shabaka =

Arabic top-level domain

.شبكة
- Introduced: 24 March 2013
- TLD type: Internationalized generic top-level domain
- Status: Active
- Registry: dotShabaka Registry
- Intended use: Arabic-language websites
- Registry website: dotshabaka.com

The Arabic top-level domain .شبكة (meaning ".web", and transcribed into English as ".shabaka") is an internationalized domain name top-level domain in the Domain Name System of the Internet for Arabic language websites. Websites using the domain can be accessed using its U-label (Note: The Unicode representation of an internationalized domain name.) (.شبكة) or A-label (Note: An encoding of a Unicode domain name in ASCII characters for transmission within the domain name system.) equivalent (.xn--ngbc5azd).

The domain was approved for use by ICANN (the Internet Corporation for Assigned Names and Numbers) in March 2013. Its sunrise period ran from 31 October to 29 December 2013, and landrush period from 2 January to 31 January 2014. General availability for the domain commenced on 4 February 2014.

== See also ==
- Internationalized country code top-level domain

== Citations ==
- Cherrayil, Naushad K. (24 March 2013). "ICANN approves .shabaka top-level domain name". Gulf News.
- "IANA Delegation Report for .شبكة". 2013.
- "FAQs". dotShabaka Registry. 2014. Archived from the original on 2014-03-18.
- "IDN Glossary". ICANN. 2014.
