= Accent Obert =

Catalan private non-profit foundation

Logo of Fundació Accent Obert

Accent Obert ("Open Accent"), formerly known as the Fundació puntCAT ("dotCat Foundation"), is a Catalan private non-profit foundation established on 28 December 2004 and registered under number 2100 in the Foundations Register of the Generalitat of Catalonia.

The mission of the foundation is to promote all kinds of activities related to the creation, management, and control of the domain name .cat and, in general, to promote the Catalan language and culture in the field of Internet and the Information and Communication Technologies. Additionally, via some grants has also partially served as a business accelerator for digital services that use the .cat domain, such as the geomarketing observatory EIXOS back in the early 2010s.

The offices of Fundació puntCAT were raided by Spanish police on September 20, 2017, as a result of the 2017 Spanish constitutional crisis.
