= Deutsche Vermögensberatung =

German financial services company

Deutsche Vermögensberatung AG
- Type: AG (Joint stock corporation)
- Industry: Financial services
- Founded: 1975
- Headquarters: Frankfurt am Main
- Products: Banking and insurance products
- Revenue: EUR 2.30 bln.
- Website: www.dvag.de/en

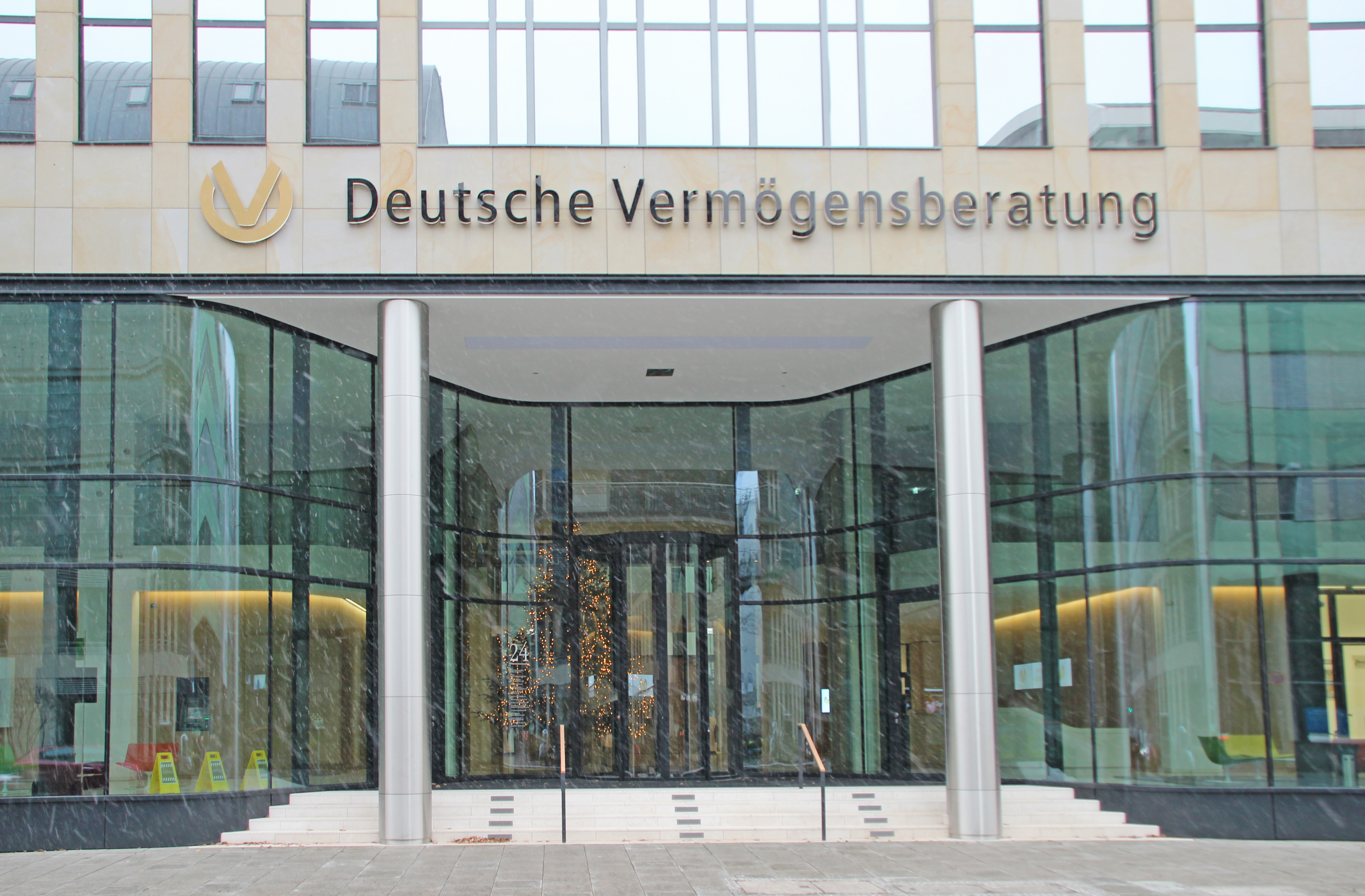
Deutsche Vermögensberatung in Frankfurt

Deutsche Vermögensberatung (DVAG; loosely translated: "German wealth advisors") is a network marketing financial services company based in Frankfurt, Germany. The DVAG is active in Germany, Austria and Switzerland. Founded in 1975 by Reinfried Pohl, the company is managed by Deutsche Vermögensberatung Holding.

With over 5,000 sales divisions and branches, Deutsche Vermögensberatung serves around 8 million clients. In fiscal year 2023, the company posted revenues of €2.30 billion and profits of €271.9 million. The total volume of contracts brokered (total portfolio) came to €251.7 billion.

== Management ==
=== Executive board ===
The company is managed by an executive board consisting of the following persons:

- Andreas Pohl (Chairman of the Board)
- Marcus Aßmuth (Corporate Development, Marketing)
- Andreas Franken (Legal, HR)
- Christian Glanz (IT, Operations, Administration)
- Lars Knackstedt (Finances, Participations, Real Estate, Taxes)
- Markus Knapp (Central Sales Development, Insurances, Education and Training)
- Helge Lach (Markets & Regulations, Trade Associations, Training Centre in Marburg)
- Steffen Leipold (Banking & Investment, Foreign Countries)
- Robert Peil (Sales Coordination, Events, Leadership Training)

=== Supervisory board ===
Hans-Theo Franken has been Chairman of the Supervisory Board since April 2021.

== History ==
In 1975, Reinfried Pohl began to build the company under the name "Kompass Gesellschaft für Vermögensanlagen GmbH". Pohl had worked for Investors Overseas Services (IOS) from 1967 to 1969, and had been employed by Bonnfinanz from 1970 to 1974. On 1 July 1975, he started out with around 35 of his former Bonnfinanz colleagues. Pohl developed the "all-finance concept" that DVAG is based upon in the 1950s.

"Allgemeine Vermögensberatung AG" (AVAG) was founded in 1976. In 1983, AVAG was renamed "Deutsche Vermögensberatung AG". Reinfried Pohl's sons Andreas and Reinfried Jr. joined the company's Executive Board in 1984. An Austrian subsidiary, now operating as "Deutsche Vermögensberatung Bank Aktiengesellschaft", was founded in 1993. Cooperation with Deutsche Bank began in 2001.

In 2003, the company restructured to form "Deutsche Vermögensberatung Holding" headquartered in Marburg. The company entered the Swiss market in 2004 with "SVAG Schweizer Vermögensberatung". In 2007, DVAG became the exclusive distributor for AachenMünchener insurances and has since managed this segment as an independent subsidiary called "Allfinanz Deutsche Vermögensberatung". That same year, FVD was integrated into the organization. In 2008, DVAG took over the distribution of Deutsche Bausparkasse Badenia and in 2018 became exclusive distributor for Generali (EVG).

== Business partners ==
In Germany, the most important partner is the Generali Deutschland group with its member companies such as Badenia Bausparkasse and Advocard Rechtsschutzversicherung (legal insurance). There are several other collaborations, e.g. with BKK Linde health insurance.

As part of its partnership with Deutsche Bank Group, DVAG has been distributing Deutsche Bank (DB) banking products and DB subsidiary DWS investment funds since 2001. Further partners are Commerzbank, HypoVereinsbank, DSL Bank, Santander Bank, Allianz Global Investors, and Geiger Edelmetalle AG.

The Deutsche Verrechnungsstelle (DV), also based in Frankfurt/Main, specializes in professional invoice management for tradespeople and the SME sector. It offers products and services to ensure the liquidity of these companies. It was founded in 2015 by Andreas Pohl and Reinfried Pohl.

In Austria, DVAG has partners with Generali Versicherungs AG, Unicredit Bank Austria, BAWAG P.S.K., Allianz Global Investors, DWS and s Bausparkasse. The DVAG's Swiss business partners have been Generali, PAX, bank zweiplus, CSS, Innova, assura, Sanitas, Glarner Kantonalbank, and, since 2021, Global Sana AG. A holding company is to be founded in which the activities of Deutsche Vermögensberatung on the Swiss market will be bundled. This holding company will include the two independently operating companies Global Sana AG and SVAG Schweizer Vermögensberatung AG.

== Sponsorship ==
DVAG has been active in sports sponsoring since 1996, and in this context the company has worked with a number of athletes. Apart from the current partnership with Jürgen Klopp, sponsoring partners include Fabian Hambüchen, Britta Heidemann, Joey Kelly and Mick Schumacher.

Seven time Formula One world champion Michael Schumacher has been working with DVAG since 1996. The existing sponsoring contract remains in effect even after Schumacher's serious skiing accident in December 2013. In February 2016, the Michael-Schumacher exhibition was opened in Marburg to celebrate the 20th anniversary of the partnership and ran through December 2018. Schumacher's son Mick is also currently sponsored by the company as he himself was a Formula One driver.

DVAG also sponsored 1. FC Kaiserslautern from 1998 to 2010.

== Social commitment ==
Deutsche Vermögensberatung supports social projects and organisations such as the non-profit organisation Menschen brauchen Menschen e.V. The DVAG has been a supporter of educational projects for children, and is one of the main partners of Tafel Deutschland since 2020.

=== RTL Spendenmarathon ===
Since the 25th RTL-Spendenmarathon 2020, Deutsche Vermögensberatung has supported the Stiftung RTL - Wir helfen Kindern e. V. foundation. Together with its brand ambassadors, it was able to collect a donation sum of 300,000 euros in 2020. At the 26th RTL Spendenmarathon 2021, a donation sum of 500,000 euros was achieved with the support of the company, which was increased to 1 million euros by the Schumacher family. The donations benefited the Stiftung RTL for its educational projects.

=== Support after the 2021 European floods ===
Deutsche Vermögensberatung collected around 650,000 euros in donations to support various measures in the flooded areas affected by the 2021 European floods. DVAG itself donated around 40 per cent of the sum.

=== Aid in the Ukraine war ===
In March 2022, Deutsche Vermögensberatung donated one million euros as emergency aid to Menschen brauchen Menschen e.V. to provide quick and unbureaucratic help to people affected by the Russian invasion of Ukraine. In mid-March, together with the organisation Luftfahrt ohne Grenzen / Wings of Help e. V., several tonnes of humanitarian aid supplies were brought to Ukraine, financed by Deutsche Vermögensberatung.
