= .nagoya =

Internet top-level domain

- Introduced: February 20, 2014; 12 years ago
- TLD type: GeoTLD
- Registry: GMO Registry
- Sponsor: Nagoya City
- Intended use: Nagoya residents, institutions, and businesses
- Registered domains: 3,572 (24 June 2025)
- Documents: ICANN registry agreement; Policies
- DNSSEC: Yes
- Registry website: hello.nagoya

.nagoya is the top-level domain for Nagoya City in the Internet's Domain Name System (DNS). The domain is operated by GMO Registry. On 20 February 2014, ICANN and GMO signed the registry agreement, under which GMO Domain Registry operates the .nagoya domain. Like other top-level domains, .nagoya is not geographically restricted to those in Nagoya and domains with the TLD can be used by anyone worldwide.

== See also ==
- .tokyo
- .jp
