= IDN Test TLDs =

ICANN created an experimental set of top-level internationalized domain names in October 2007 for the purpose of testing the use of Internationalizing Domain Names in Applications (IDNA) in the root zone and within those domains. ICANN announced that these domains would be removed from the root zone of the Domain Name System effective on 31 October 2013. They no longer resolve but are still listed in the IANA Root Zone Database. Each of these TLDs names encoded a word meaning "test" in the respective language.

The zone file for each of these domains contained only one second-level name, encoding the word "example" in the respective script and language. Each example.test name resolved to a host where ICANN operated a test wiki on behalf of the corresponding user community.

== IDN Test TLDs ==
DNS Name	IDN	Transliteration	Language	Script	URL of the test site (archived at the Wayback Machine)
xn--kgbechtv	إختبار.	ik͡htibār	Arabic	Arabic	http://مثال.إختبار
xn--hgbk6aj7f53bba	آزمایشی.	ậzmạy̰sẖy	Persian	Perso-Arabic	http://مثال.آزمایشی
xn--0zwm56d	.测试	cèshì	Chinese	Simplified Chinese	http://例子.测试
xn--g6w251d	.測試	cèshì	Chinese	Traditional Chinese	http://例子.測試
xn--80akhbyknj4f	.испытание	ispytánije	Russian	Cyrillic	http://пример.испытание
xn--11b5bs3a9aj6g	.परीक्षा	parīkṣā	Hindi	Devanagari	http://उदाहरण.परीक्षा
xn--jxalpdlp	.δοκιμή	dokimé	Greek	Greek	http://παράδειγμα.δοκιμή
xn--9t4b11yi5a	.테스트	teseuteu	Korean	Hangul	http://실례.테스트
xn--deba0ad	טעסט.	test	Yiddish	Hebrew	http://בײַשפּיל.טעסט
xn--zckzah	.テスト	tesuto	Japanese	Katakana	http://例え.テスト
xn--hlcj6aya9esc7a	.பரிட்சை	pariṭcai	Tamil	Tamil	http://உதாரணம்.பரிட்சை
