= .wien =

Internet top-level domain

- Introduced: February 2014
- TLD type: GeoTLD
- Status: Delegated
- Registry: punkt.wien
- Sponsor: Vienna
- Intended use: Viennese residents, institutions, and businesses
- Actual use: Viennese residents, institutions, and businesses
- Registration restrictions: Any natural person, legal person, organisation or association intending to show an economic, cultural, tourist, historical, social or other affinity with the Austrian federal capital.
- Structure: Registrations on the second level
- Dispute policies: ERDRP
- DNSSEC: Yes
- Registry website: nic.wien

.wien is a top-level domain in the Internet for Vienna, Austria. It was approved by ICANN on October 28, 2013, and became available for public registration of second-level domains on February 11, 2014.

The intent of the domain is to create a unique, individual identity for citizens, companies, and institutions. It is designed to serve the needs of the community of the City of Vienna and to improve awareness of Vienna's historical heritage, and help economic growth. Among the first registrants was the Viennese Volksoper.

== See also ==
- .tirol - TLD of Tyrol
- .at - TLD of Austria
