= ITunes Ping =

Music-oriented social networking system

iTunes Ping
- Website type: Social networking service
- Available in: Multilingual
- Registration: Required
- Users: > 1 million after 48 hours; discontinued
- Launched: September 1, 2010; 16 years ago
- Current status: Discontinued September 30, 2012

iTunes Ping, or simply Ping, was a software-based, music-oriented social networking and recommender system developed and operated by Apple Inc. It was announced and launched on September 1, 2010, as part of the tenth major release of iTunes. The service launched with 1 million members^{[a]} in 23 countries.

The service allowed users to follow artists and see short, timely postings by both friends and artists. Ping was also accessible via iTunes for the iPhone and iPod Touch.

Apple officially closed the service on September 30, 2012, and replaced it with Facebook and Twitter integration in iTunes.

== History ==
=== Name ===
After Ping's official announcement on September 1, 2010, Karsten Manufacturing, the parent company of PING, a golfing equipment manufacturer, released a statement regarding the name of Apple's social network, stating that Karsten Manufacturing had entered into an agreement with Apple under which Apple will use the "Ping" trademark in connection with its iTunes application. The name has also caused minor confusion as the term "to ping", which was being used by users of Ping, is already a commonly used but unrelated computer term used in conjunction with Ping networking utility.

=== Announcement ===
Ping was announced by Apple CEO Steve Jobs as being "sort of like Facebook and Twitter meet iTunes," but stating that "Ping is not Facebook" and "it is not Twitter," instead describing it as "something else ... all about music." Many have speculated that Ping was meant to compete directly with the declining MySpace, which was still holding on to its existence through music.

=== Endorsement ===
The announcement was endorsed by both Chris Martin, lead singer of Coldplay, who closed the event by performing "Viva La Vida" and "Yellow", as well as an unreleased song titled "Wedding Bells", and Lady Gaga who introduced the social network in a recorded video message that was played as part of the practical demo of the service.

== Issues ==
=== Facebook ===
During Apple's announcement of Ping, chief executive Steve Jobs gave a demo of the service in which he demonstrated the basic functionality of the service, including Facebook integration. However, shortly after Ping was released to the public, users began to report that Facebook's social integration had been removed.

Kara Swisher, technology columnist for the Wall Street Journal, reported that after speaking to Steve Jobs regarding the matter, he had revealed that Facebook and Apple had failed to reach an agreement. Jobs further reported that Facebook wanted "onerous terms that [Apple] could not agree to." However, Apple launched Ping with Facebook integration without authorization, and that subsequently, Facebook implemented a block, denying Ping access to the application programming interface (API), necessary in "linking" Facebook with Ping. The result was the inability to search for an iTunes user's friends on Facebook who were also connected to Ping.

To provide Facebook integration in Ping, Apple had to retrieve users' information using Facebook's API instead. Facebook provides its APIs for third parties to use for free, but "high-volume" services such as Ping that are expected to make more than 100 million information requests per 24-hour period, are required to negotiate terms of use with Facebook, in accordance to Facebook's Developer Principles and Policies.

=== Spam ===
Twenty-four hours after Ping was launched to the public, reports of the service being flooded with spam were published. The fraudsters would create an iTunes profile and post links to a number of online scams, including ones that promised "free iPhones" or "free iPads" in exchange for filling out online surveys. For the most part, these suspicious links were being posted in the comments sections of popular artists on Ping, such as Britney Spears, Lady Gaga, Katy Perry and U2, all of whom were among the recommended accounts listed on the Ping homepage.

Security vendor Sophos expressed bemusement that Apple had allegedly set up no spam or URL filtering in Ping, leaving the service open to spam commenting. MacRumors reported that the "first 'free iPhone' spam wave remained active for up to four hours before being disabled." PC World noted that if Sophos' claims are correct it would be very "surprising ... considering that Apple appears to be filtering profile photos."

=== Fake accounts ===
On September 2, 2010, singer-songwriter Ben Folds reported via Twitter that an account had been created in his name, continuing to mention that he is unaware as to who had created it. Graham Cluley, senior technology consultant at Sophos, said it is "used to ... scams like this being spread far and wide via sites like Facebook, but clearly the lack of filtering on Ping is making it a brand new playground for [scammers] to operate in."

=== Limited availability ===
The service was initially available in 23 countries where users have full access to the iTunes Store. Therefore, users in countries with limited or no access to the iTunes Store, such as Chile, the Czech Republic, Croatia and India, were unable to access Ping.

== Closure ==
Apple closed the service on September 30, 2012, and replaced it in iTunes with Facebook and Twitter integration. Ping failed to gain much traction with users. The social network remained operational until iTunes 10.6.3.

== Service ==
Users of Ping were able to view what music their friends were purchasing and reviewing. Users also received a personalized "charts" list that featured what other people with a similar taste in music were listening to through iTunes. Additionally, users were informed about what concerts their friends were attending and were able to purchase tickets accordingly.

== Reception ==
There were favorable reviews of Ping. Business Insider reported that it was "impressed" and "could see using [the service] regularly." Wired gave the service a favorable review, stating that "Ping has significant advantages against other music-oriented social networks." ReadWriteWeb concluded that the service is "OK", stating that it has "potential." MacTech listed several complaints voiced by early adopters (such as Ping's lack of podcast and iOS app integration), but ultimately concluded that the service could eventually become "a pretty useful social network for music junkies."

The Guardian criticised the lack of existing social network integration, and NowPublic continued to criticise the absence of major artists and users inability to perform "basic" social networking interactions, such as posting status updates. CNN rated Ping as one of the ten biggest tech 'fails' of 2010.

== Notes ==
- An "active member" is defined by Apple as a user who has registered a valid payment method with their Apple ID, i.e. a credit or debit card.
