= .tokyo =

Internet top-level domain

- Introduced: January 16, 2014
- TLD type: GeoTLD
- Registry: GMO Registry
- Sponsor: Metropolis of Tokyo
- Intended use: Tokyo residents, institutions, and businesses
- Registered domains: 178,312 (1 January 2023)
- Documents: ICANN registry agreement; Policies
- DNSSEC: Yes
- Registry website: hello.tokyo

The domain name tokyo is a top-level domain (TLD) for Tokyo in the Domain Name System of the Internet. On November 13, 2013, ICANN and GMO Registry entered into a registry agreement under which GMO Registry operates the tokyo TLD.

Like other top-level domains, the tokyo TLD can be registered by people living outside of Tokyo.

== See also ==
- .jp
- .nagoya
