= .saarland =

Internet top-level domain for Saarland, Germany

.saarland (dotSAARLAND) is an ICANN-approved generic top level domain (TLD). It falls into the category of Geographic TLDs ("GeoTLDs"). The new top level domain is meant for all people and businesses in the German Federal State of Saarland and those otherwise associated with Saarland. However, any natural person and any entity is eligible to register domain names in the .SAARLAND TLD.

The dotSaarland GmbH (nic.saarland) successfully applied for the right to operate the .SAARLAND extension and to allocate domains for this name space. The application was evaluated and accepted by the responsible Internet authority ICANN (Internet Corporation for Assigned Names and Numbers). The technical registry operator is KSregistry.

== .SAARLAND Launch Phases ==
Registrations for .saarland started on July 17, 2014, in phases known as Sunrise, Founders Program, Landrush (until October 22, 2014) and General Availability (as of October 30, 2014).

== The Non-profit dotSaarland Association ==
The non-profit dotSaarland Association (dotSaarland e.V.), founded in 2009, has its offices in St. Ingbert, Saarland. The Federal State of Saarland, represented by the Ministry of Economy, is a founding member of the Association. Membership in dotSaarland e.V. is open to individuals, as well as to representatives from politics and businesses. The Association supports the TLD registry with consulting, and ensures that the TLD is operated in keeping with the needs of local people and the Internet community in general.
