= .nyc =

Top-level domain for New York City, US

- Introduced: March 20, 2014
- TLD type: GeoTLD
- Status: Delegated
- Registry: GoDaddy Registry
- Sponsor: City of New York
- Intended use: New York City residents, institutions, and businesses
- Registration restrictions: nexus with City
- Structure: Direct second-level registrations allowed
- Registry website: www.ownit.nyc

.nyc is a top level domain (TLD) for New York City. It was delegated to the root zone by ICANN on March 20, 2014.

In May 2018, the .nyc registry updated its WHOIS access policy to protect personally identifiable information of domain registrants. Under the new policy, personally identifiable information is no longer publicly available through an initial WHOIS search.

== Background ==
New York-based company name.space, founded by Paul Garrin, began operating its own alternative root zone system in 1997 including a .nyc top level domain. name.space applied for inclusion of its .nyc, along with a number of other strings, as TLDs in the IANA root during the 2000 ICANN application round. Its application was refused. Another company, Names@Work, also put in an application in 2000 but withdrew for lack of funding.

The first municipal support for the .nyc TLD was the Internet Empowerment Resolution passed by Queens Community Board 3, a local planning unit of the City of New York, on April 19, 2001. The Resolution called for the city's Commission on Public Information and Communication or a public interest organization to acquire and develop the TLD.

By the mid-2000s interest in gaining local TLDs had arisen in other cities, notably Paris and Berlin. Some of those proponents contacted Thomas Lowenhaupt, the former Community Board member who had introduced the Queens Resolution. In 2007, with the Bloomberg Administration having indicated that it did not intend to apply for the .nyc TLD, Lowenhaupt formed a non-profit 'Connecting .nyc' to acquire and develop the .nyc TLD for community use. On June 6, 2008 Council Member Gale Brewer led the introduction of Resolution 1495-2008 supporting "the local efforts to acquire the .nyc Top Level Domain and urging The Internet Corporation for Assigned Names and Numbers to approve the City's application in order to meet the needs of city residents via the Internet."

At the ICANN meeting in Paris in July 2008 a green light was given for the development of a new TLD application round, including cities.

On October 17, 2008, Brewer held a public hearing in support of her bill. Witnesses included Lowenhaupt, Antony Van Couvering of Names@Work, and Paul Garrin. Van Couvering proposed that .nyc be run by his company as a purely commercial enterprise, with a portion of the revenue dedicated to benefiting the community. He testified that he was willing to work with Lowenhaupt on community interests. The bill itself would eventually be shelved at the end of 2009.

In her February 12, 2009 State of the City address City Council Speaker Christine Quinn proposed the .nyc TLD as a public-private partnership. names@work, now under the name DotNYC, opened a new dedicated website which reported on Quinn's speech. "The crowd, made up of elected politicians and dignitaries, literally chanted "Dot N – Y – C" at the end of her description of it". Further press reports were confidently quoted by DotNYC. These included details that they expected to pay the city a third of all revenue, $3 million per year initially, rising to $10 million a year. In June 2009, DotNYC released a testimonial video of former Mayor Ed Koch saying "DotNYC is the best real estate opportunity since the Dutch bought Manhattan".

Wheels had been put in motion and, on April 15, 2009, the New York City Department of Information Technology and Telecommunications (DoITT) issued a Request for Information (RFI). Connecting.nyc published its response, which called for many names (second level domains) to be reserved for community use. On October 5, 2009 a Request for Proposals (RFP) was issued by the City of New York seeking "services to obtain, manage, administer, maintain and market the geographic Top Domain name .nyc." Notably, conditions included that proposals include a system of ensuring nexus with the city, and also a preliminary list of reserved names including all city precincts, schools, districts, and neighborhoods.

=== Creation of .nyc ===
In March 2012, name.space reported it had filed for trademark protection on a number of its TLDs, including .nyc.

In April 2012 the city announced that NeuStar, Inc., a Virginia-based firm, had been selected from the RFP submissions and on June 12, 2012 the City of New York submitted an application to ICANN for the .nyc TLD. Neustar paid the $185,000 application fee.

In May 2012 Garrin wrote to local dignitaries protesting the Neustar contract, and asserting name.space's rights to the .nyc TLD.

The application on behalf of the city passed initial evaluation at ICANN on May 24, 2013.

ICANN delegated .nyc to the DNS root zone on March 20, 2014.

== Advisory board ==
On March 22, 2013 the .NYC Community Advisory Board was formed. Members include Thomas Lowenhaupt, former ICANN Chair Esther Dyson, and representatives of the local tech and academic community. It was later disbanded.
