= .mx =

Internet country code top-level domain for Mexico

- Introduced: 1 February 1989
- TLD type: Country code top-level domain
- Status: Active
- Registry: NIC México
- Sponsor: ITESM
- Intended use: Entities connected with Mexico
- Actual use: No nexus or presence requirement is enforced, but most use is in Mexico
- Registered domains: 1,339,046 (2022-12-19)
- Registration restrictions: None for .mx nor .com.mx; other subdomains may have restrictions
- Structure: Second-level registrations after October 31, 2009; registration at third level beneath generic-category second-level domains
- Dispute policies: LDRP
- DNSSEC: Yes
- Registry website: NIC México Dominios.mx

.mx is the Internet country code top-level domain (ccTLD) for Mexico, which in 2009 was re-opened to new registrations by NIC México. In 2009, the .mx ccTLD was rolled out in three steps:

- Sunrise period from 1 May to 31 July 2009, waiting period, registrants who have already registered any other .MX second-level domain were able to register their domain for one year
- Waiting period from 1 August to 31 August 2009, to set up the domains registered in the Sunrise period, and to resolve domain name disputes
- Initial registration period from 1 September to 31 October 2009; in this part the registration will be done with the policy first-come, first-served and only for one year with a special set of prices.

After the three phases, .mx registrations were opened to the public.

== Second-level domains ==
Up until August 2009, domain registrations besides .MX consisted of third-level names beneath second-level names which parallel some of the top-level domains:

- .com.mx: Commercial entities (actually unrestricted, like .com)
- .net.mx: Network providers (registration limited to qualifying entities)
- .org.mx: Non-profit organizations (registration limited to qualifying entities)
- .ngo.mx: Non-profit organizations or Civil society organizations (registration NOT limited to qualifying entities)
- .edu.mx: Educational institutions (registration limited to qualifying entities)
- .gob.mx: Federal, State or Municipal Governmental entities only (.gob derives from the Spanish word for government: "Gobierno")

Currently second level domains can be registered directly under .mx.

On 30 April 2009, second level domain registrations were 0.06% of the total. A month later the value was up to 4.9% On 30 April 2010, second level registrations were 21.4% of the total.

== See also ==
- Internet in Mexico
