= .rio =

Internet top-level domain for Rio de Janeiro

- Introduced: 2015
- TLD type: GeoTLD
- Registry: Empresa Municipal de Informática S.A. -IPLANRIO
- Sponsor: City of Rio de Janeiro
- Intended use: Rio de Janeiro residents, institutions, and businesses
- Registration restrictions: The applicant must have an official address in Rio de Janeiro and must have a CPF or CNPJ
- Documents: ICANN registry agreement
- Registry website: prefeitura.rio/web/meudominiorio/

The domain name rio is a top-level domain (TLD) for Rio de Janeiro in the Domain Name System of the Internet. On 27 February 2014, ICANN and Empresa Municipal de Informática SA – IPLANRIO entered into a Registry Agreement under which Empresa Municipal de Informática SA – IPLANRIO operates the rio TLD. It was officially launched in 2015.

== See also ==
- .br
