= .рус =

Top-level domain

- Introduced: May 24, 2016
- TLD type: generic top-level domain
- Status: active
- Sponsor: "Russian Names company" (in Russian).
- Intended use: Russian-speaking users and organizations
- Registration restrictions: Cyrillic characters only; Latin characters are not permitted
- Structure: Registration directly at the second (top) level is allowed
- Dispute policies: UDRP
- DNSSEC: yes

.рус (Note: These are Cyrillic letters from the Russian alphabet, corresponding to ".rus" in the Latin alphabet.) (Note: Short for Русский, Russkiy, 'Russian'.) is a top-level domain intended for the Russian-speaking Internet community. It was delegated on 29 September 2014. Priority registration began on 3 September 2015. Open registration started on 24 May 2016. .рус is one of 11 top-level domains for which issuance and reissuance of certificates were suspended due to the geopolitical situation in Ukraine.

== Function ==
The .рус domain is intended for all Internet users who are speakers of the Russian language and participants in Russian culture. It is not a country-code top-level domain and is not associated with any specific state or nation. It has generic status. Only characters of the Russian alphabet, digits, and the hyphen may be used in domain names.

== History ==
=== Background ===
In 2008, work began on a national Cyrillic domain for the Russian Federation, which was named .рф in October of that year. The direct Cyrillic transliteration of .ru, .ру, was considered a poor fit because it is visually indistinguishable from the country-code top-level domain of Paraguay, .py.

=== Proposal for a new domain ===
A letter proposing the delegation of a new domain intended for the global Russian-speaking community was submitted to ICANN in June 2011, as an initiative of the Russian registrar Webnames.ru and the Russian Internet Center, together with the Ukrainian Network Information Center. An application for the .рус domain was submitted to ICANN in April 2012 as part of the New gTLD Program, which provided for the launch of numerous new top-level domains. The idea received positive feedback from the global Russian-speaking community. Support was expressed by the Coordination Center for TLD .RU, RU-CENTER, the Foundation for Assistance for Internet Technologies and Infrastructure Development, the Ukrainian Network Information Center, the Kazakhstan Association of IT Companies, KazNIC, the Internet Society of Armenia, the administrator of Azerbaijan's root domain, and the Russian–Canadian Business Club. Russian ICANN-accredited registrars RU-CENTER, Centrohost, and Regtime declared their readiness to register domain names in the .рус zone.

On 17 December 2012, a draw was held in Los Angeles among applicants for new top-level domains. The .рус application received review number 56 out of 1,917 applicants. In March 2013 the application was approved by ICANN after passing its initial evaluation. The domain was selected for participation in preliminary testing of new gTLDs. .pyc was one of 12 domains chosen out of 1,912 applications and the only Cyrillic domain chosen.

In July 2013, ICANN said it was ready to sign an agreement with the company Russian Names, which would manage the new .рус top-level domain. The agreement confirmed the absence of objections, competing applications, or recommendations from the Governmental Advisory Committee (GAC). In August, ICANN classified .рус as a "low-risk" domain with regard to name collisions, meaning the domain could be launched 120 days after signing the agreement. ICANN and Russian Names signed the agreement on 14 December 2013.

Between December 2013 and January 2014, all ICANN-accredited Russian domain registrars announced their intention to begin registration of .рус domain names. By early February, ICANN had successfully completed technical testing of the new domain. Over the next few months, the Ministry of Culture of Russia, the Russkiy Mir Foundation, the television channel REN TV, and the executive committee of the Union State all expressed interest in the project. The .рус domain was officially delegated on 29 September 2014, with Russian Names as the administrator.

=== Registration ===
Registration of domain names in the .рус zone took place in several stages, beginning on 3 September 2015 with priority registration for trademark owners listed in the Trademark Clearinghouse (TMCH). The following stages were:

- 3 September – 6 October 2015: TMCH trademark holders
- 7 October – 6 November 2015: Trademarks protected in the Russian Federation
- 11 November – 11 December 2015: Company names, mass media, non-profit organizations, geographical indications
- 14 December 2015 – 15 January 2016: Public authorities and international, state, and public organizations (free registration)
- 18 January – 11 March 2016: Registration at higher prices via a Dutch auction
- 15 March – 20 May 2016: Limited premium registration for .ru domain holders, with ownership and active website verification
- 24 May 2016: The domain became available to all applicants on a first-come, first-served basis. More than 11,000 domains were registered during the first month. Premium domains were available at higher prices. Registration was offered through major Russian and international ICANN-accredited registrars.

== See also ==
- [[.рф|.рф]]
- .ru
