= .africa =

Internet top-level domain for the African Union

- Introduced: 11 February 2017; 1 July 2017 (public availability)
- TLD type: GeoTLD
- Status: Active
- Registry: Registry.Africa
- Intended use: Sites associated with Africa, pan-Africanism, and/or the African Union
- Registration restrictions: None specified
- Structure: Registrations at second level (ie. domain.africa)
- Documents: ICANN Registry Agreement; Policies
- DNSSEC: Yes
- Registry website: registry.africa

.africa is the officially designated top-level domain (TLD) for the African and Pan-African communities and users wherever they reside. It is a sponsored generic top-level domain (gTLD) operated by the Registry Africa. The .africa namespace is open to individuals, businesses and organizations around the world. The .africa domains are intended to showcase their brand and commitment to the African continent, establishing a home for Africa-specific products and services, expanding a brand's regional influence and acquiring online real-estate.

The .africa domain became available to the general public on 4 July 2017.

== History ==
.africa was launched at the African Union Commission in 2017.

The .africa domain name registration was made available to the public in July 2017. The first large corporation to adopt the .africa domain was Absa.

== Regional support ==
The .africa initiative is fully endorsed by the African Union Commission. According to Registry Africa, 78% of African governments support the TLD.

== Status ==
The operator of the .africa gTLD is Registry Africa. Sponsoring Organisation is the ZA Central Registry trading as Registry.Africa.

As of December 2024, there were about 52,000 registered .africa domains from 70 accredited registrars globally.

=== Legal dispute ===
The .africa application that was submitted by DotConnectAfrica Trust is the subject of an unresolved disagreement with ICANN (DCA Trust v. ICANN) following an Independent Review Panel (IRP) process that was invoked by DCA Trust under ICANN's accountability mechanism in October 2013. The IRP was administrated by the International Center for Dispute Resolution (ICDR) of the American Arbitration Association (AAA) New York, US.

==== Dispute background ====
DCA Trust had passed all the new gTLD applicant evaluation criteria, but before the Initial Evaluation (IE) result was issued, a Governmental Advisory Committee (GAC) Objection Advice that had been issued in Beijing in April 2013 was later accepted by the ICANN Board in early June 2013 which caused the ICANN Board to instruct ICANN staff that DCA Trust's .Africa new gTLD application will not be approved.

This had caused the non-completion of the evaluation of DCA Trust's application, which then led DCA Trust to challenge the ICANN Board decision through a series of accountability mechanism.

DCA Trust prevailed in the Independent Review Process against ICANN when the Panel of jurists ruled on 9 July 2015, that ICANN violated its Bylaws and Articles of Incorporation; and therefore declared "that both the actions and inactions of the Board with respect to the application of DCA Trust relating to the .AFRICA gTLD were inconsistent with the Articles of Incorporation and Bylaws of ICANN".

As a result of the IRP declaration, the ICANN Board resolved on July 16, 2015, to reinstate DCA's application back to the new gTLD Process to complete initial evaluation. The IRP ruling also ordered ICANN to continue to refrain from delegating the .AFRICA gTLD to ZA Central Registry (ZACR).

On January 20, 2016 ICANN was taken to the US Court regarding the way ICANN processed the IRP which declared DCA Trust the prevailing party in July 2015. The United States District Court, Central District of California in a ruling granted DCA Trust an Interim Relief for DotConnectAfrica and ordered ICANN to hold the delegation the .AFRICA top-level domain to ZACR. The same court also granted a Preliminary Injunction for DotConnectAfrica on April 12, 2016.

ICANN and ZACR both contested the ruling; the court dismissed ZACR from the case leading to the filing of an interlocutory appeal. Six months later, the case was moved to the Superior Court of California owing to lack of jurisdiction. Superior Court Judge Howard Halm denied the motion by Dot Connect Africa to obtain an injunction that saw the launch of the top level domain at the African Union Commission, in Addis Ababa.

The final delegation of the .africa Top Level Domain went to Registry Africa Ltd, a wholly owned subsidiary of the ZACR.
