= .gal =

Internet top-level domain for Galicia

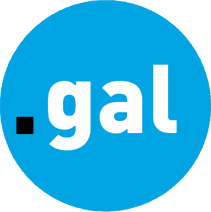
- Introduced: 13 March 2014
- TLD type: GeoTLD
- Status: Active
- Registry: Asociación PuntoGal
- Sponsor: Asociación PuntoGal
- Intended use: Galicia and Galician culture
- Registration restrictions: Unknown
- Structure: Registrations would be taken directly at second level
- DNSSEC: Yes
- Registry website: dominio.gal

.gal (Galician pronunciation: [ˈpuntʊ ˈɣal]) is a GeoTLD intended to highlight the Galician people, Galician language, and Galician culture. It was approved on 14 June 2013 by ICANN, and the first 93 domains went online on July 25, 2014, a date chosen to echo Galicia’s National Day and strengthen its cultural significance.

The initiative was backed by more than 13,700 people and 110 institutions in Galicia, including relevant agencies of culture such as the Royal Galician Academy, the Galician Culture Council, and the three Galician universities. Asociación PuntoGal is committed to establishing a foundation to reinvest the money in projects that promote Galician language and culture in the field of new technologies.

== See also ==
- List of Internet top-level domains
- Top-level domain
