= .bzh =

Internet top-level domain for Brittany, France

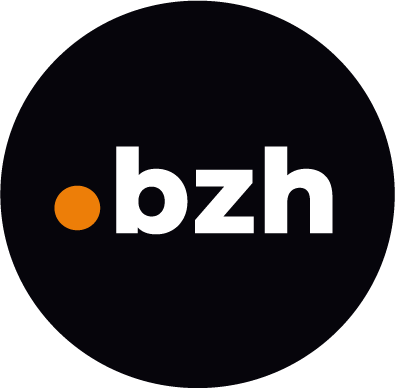
- .bzh logo
- Introduced: 29 May 2014
- TLD type: GeoTLD
- Status: Delegated
- Registry: Association www.bzh
- Sponsor: Association www.bzh
- Intended use: Entities associated with Brittany or the Breton culture and languages
- Registration restrictions: Must be an individual or legal entity residing in Brittany (including Loire-Atlantique) or A website in Breton (even partially) published within 6 months or A website promoting Breton culture (even partially) published within 6 months or A registrant who is member of association www.bzh
- Structure: Registrations would be taken directly at second level
- Dispute policies: UDRP
- DNSSEC: Yes
- Registry website: www.pik.bzh

.bzh is an approved Internet generic top-level domain intended for Brittany and the Breton culture and languages. On 10 May 2013, ICANN approved the creation of this domain. On 27 February 2014, ICANN signed a Registry Agreement with the applicant.

== History ==
The idea of applying for a .bzh top level domain was first mentioned in 2004 by Christian Ménard, member of the French Parliament. The introduction of the top level .cat domain in 2006 revived the idea. An online petition, initiated by Mikael Bodlore-Penlaez via the Geobreizh.com website, mobilized public opinion and encouraged local authorities to state public support for this project. The Conseil Général d'Ille et Vilaine (14 April 2006), the Conseil Régional de Bretagne (14 June 2006), the Conseil Général du Finistère (15 June 2006) unanimously supported the idea of creation of a .bzh.

In 2007, the Regional Council of Brittany initiated a feasibility study of the project. Under the direction of a steering committee involving various stakeholders, in 2008 this study resulted in the establishment of a formal structure to support the Breton application: www.bzh.

The www.bzh association was responsible for establishing the application, gathering the necessary funds to ensure its submission and its promotion within the Breton community. The association in December 2008 was granted financial support from the Conseil Régional de Bretagne. The online petition received more than 21,000 signatures.

In 2014, the top-level domain .bzh was approved and is now used by a variety of individuals, groups and businesses that are located in Brittany or have links to the region.

In 2023, the Breton internet extension .bzh had more than 12,000 registrations. Alongside the promotion of the .bzh internet extension, the www.bzh association promotes other services to develop Brittany's image on the web, including a campaign for a Breton flag emoji and an email service.

== See also ==
- List of Internet top-level domains
- Top-level domain
