= .london =

Internet top-level domain for London, England

- Introduced: Application to ICANN by Mayor Boris Johnson. Approved by ICANN in June 2013 and delegated 13 February 2014.
- TLD type: GeoTLD
- Status: Active
- Registry: Minds + Machines Group Limited
- Sponsor: London
- Intended use: London residents, institutions, and businesses
- Structure: TBA
- Documents: ICANN registry agreement
- Dispute policies: TBA
- Registry website: register.london

.london (stylised in official materials as .LONDON) is a top-level domain (TLD) for London, England. It was approved by ICANN as a city-level TLD on 7 June 2013. On 29 April 2014, the domain name went on sale for the first time. London and Partners, which promotes the city, said that .london would carry a premium because of its exclusivity.
