= .bar =

Internet domain

Logo of the .bar gTLD

.bar is an Internet domain that is specifically geared for bars, pubs and nightclubs, including bar and restaurant guides, critics, delivery services, wine and liquor, and related industries. It is a gTLD owned by Mexico City–based company Punto 2012. The domain .bar was released on June 11, 2014.

== Original purpose of .bar domain ==
According to ICANN, the intended use was as a geographical name for the city of Bar, Montenegro. In order to receive rights, Punto 2012 had to reach an agreement with the Municipality of Bar for the rights to exclusively exploit domain rights. Some organizations and companies from Bar, Montenegro use the .bar domain instead of Montenegro's national .me.

== History ==
The .bar launch was divided into three phases: Trademark Holder (Sunrise), Priority Pre-Registration (Landrush) and General Availability. Each phase has specific application requirements.

=== Trademark Holders Registration (Sunrise) ===
From April 9, 2014, at 18:00 UTC to June 8, 2014, at 18:00 UTC, trademark holders could submit an application to register a .bar domain containing their owned mark, before it was available to the public.

=== Priority Pre-Registration (Landrush) ===
From June 11, 2014, at 18:00 UTC to July 10, 2014, at 18:00 UTC, customers could purchase .bar domain names at a premium price.

=== General Availability ===
Beginning July 14, 2014, at 18:00 UTC, customers could register .bar domain names on a first-come, first-served basis. Bulk .bar registration is supported during General Availability. Multiple applications with different registrars are resolved on a first-come, first-served basis during this period.

== Other information ==
.bar domain names can have up to 63 characters. .bar domains cannot be registered with special characters such as & and # in them.

The .bar extension supports Latin IDN (Internationalized Domain Name) characters.
