= .paris =

Internet top-level domain

- Introduced: 2008
- TLD type: GeoTLD
- Status: Active
- Registry: ICANN
- Intended use: Paris residents, institutions and businesses
- Registration restrictions: Prove any direct or indirect link with the Paris region
- Structure: Direct second-level registrations are allowed
- DNSSEC: Yes
- Registry website: bienvenue.paris

.paris is a top-level domain for the city of Paris, France. It was introduced in June 2008 by ICANN, and the first 100 ".paris" web addresses were assigned in mid-2014.

At the time of launch, domain names corresponding to Parisian places (streets, squares, etc.) were reserved for the authorities concerned. Others, very generic, were blocked without the registry having yet made a decision on the allocation method.

From September to November 2014, the rightful owners of trademarks (protected, company names, names of French municipalities) were given priority in registering .paris domain names. It was also possible to register, without having any particular rights, domain names before the general public opening at a higher rate, or even at auction if several candidates coveted the same domain name.

Since 2 December 2014, .paris is open to the general public. The available domain names are allocated on a first-come, first-served basis.

== See also ==
- Internet in France
- .fr –CC TLD for the Republic of France
- .eu –CC TLD for the European Union
