= .eus =

Internet top-level domain for the Basque language

- Introduced: 3 December 2014
- TLD type: Sponsored top-level domain
- Status: Active
- Registry: Domeinuak
- Sponsor: PuntuEus Fundazioa
- Intended use: Entities associated with the (Basque Country (autonomous community)) Basque language
- Registered domains: 15,599 (11 Jan 2024)
- Registration restrictions: .eus Registration Policy
- Documents: ICANN Document
- DNSSEC: Yes
- Registry website: puntu.eus

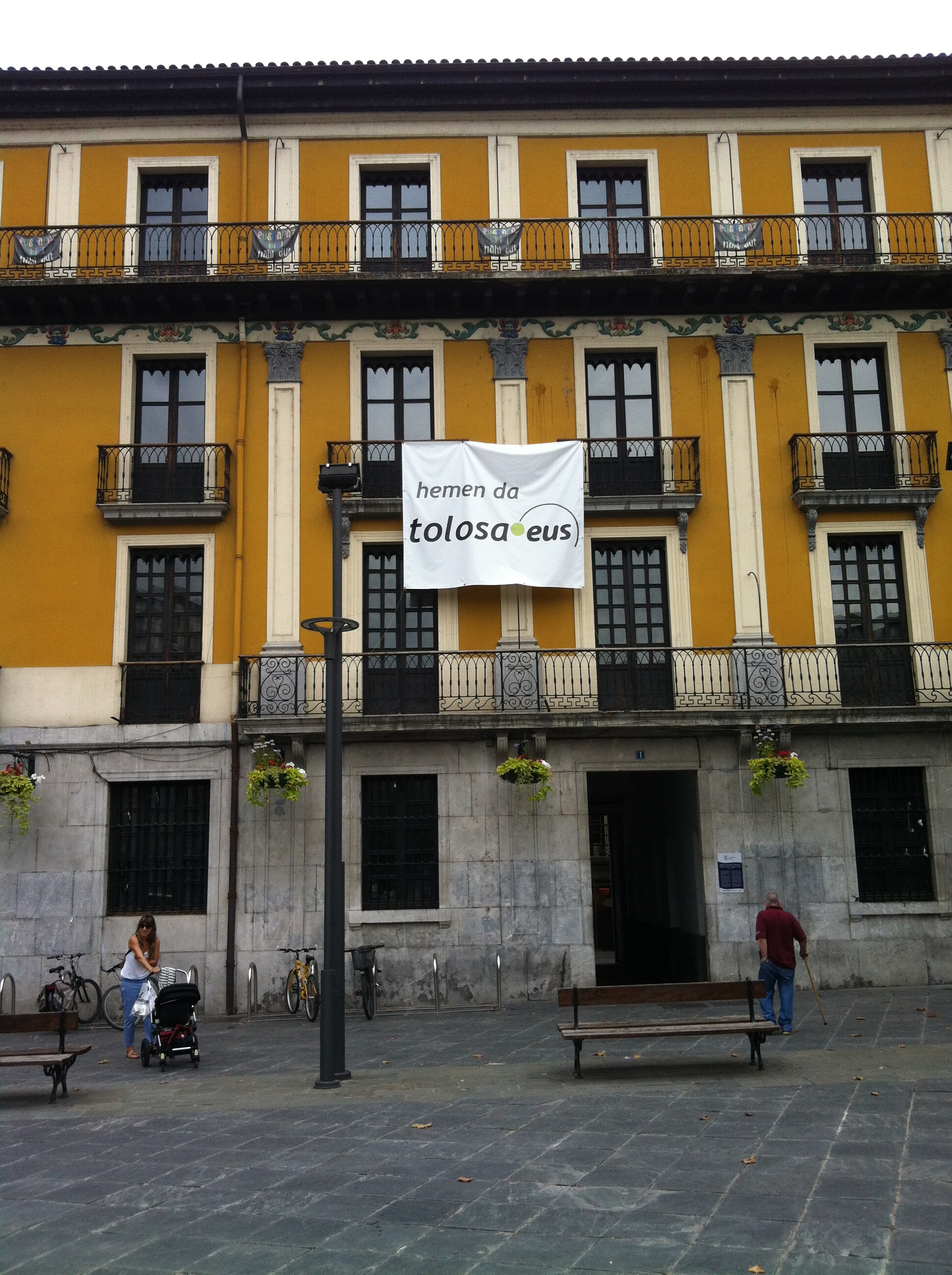
A banner advertising .eus

.eus is the top-level domain for the Basque language. The abbreviation eus comes from the Basque endonym euskara, meaning "Basque language". Before its creation, .eu (European Union ccTLD) domain was also used for this purpose, although unofficially.

== History ==
In 2008, dotCYMRU, dotEUS, dotSCOT, and dotBZH formed ECLID. In May 2012, the PuntuEus foundation applied to ICANN have a domain that represented the Basque language. On 10 June 2013, ICANN approved the creation of the domain. Use of the domain name was restricted until March–April 2014. However, ICANN facilitated an eus qualified launch program that allowed certain websites to claim a .eus domain before this General Registration date.

== Registration Policy ==
Like many domain names, .eus has requirements for websites registering under it. Websites under this domain must follow the Registration Policy set forth by the .eus TLD, the Registration Agreement provided by the sponsoring registrar, and any other policies mandated by ICANN.

Those who do register must have membership of the Basque linguistics and cultural community as well as have a website that is beneficial to the community. Domain names under .eus are distributed on a "first come first serve" basis, and are processed in chronological order of the receipt for the domain.
