= .cat =

Internet top-level domain for the Catalan people

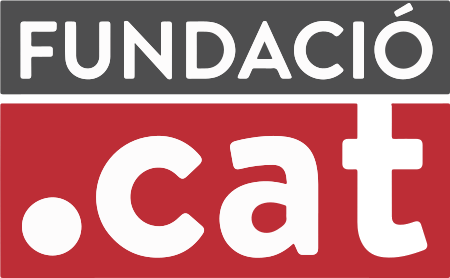
- Introduced: December 19, 2005; 20 years ago
- TLD type: Sponsored top-level domain
- Status: Active
- Registry: Associació puntCAT
- Sponsor: Accent Obert
- Intended use: (Catalonia) Catalan linguistic and cultural community
- Actual use: Sees some use in Catalonia and Catalan-speaking areas; occasionally sees use for websites related to cats
- Registered domains: 109,110 (May 2019)
- Registration restrictions: Screening is done both before and after registration to ensure registrants are part of applicable community
- Structure: Direct second-level registrations are allowed
- Documents: ICANN New sTLD RFP Application
- Dispute policies: UDRP, Charter Eligibility Dispute Resolution Procedure (CEDRP), Compliance Reconsideration Policy (CRP)
- DNSSEC: Yes
- Registry website: domini.cat

.cat (spelled out in Catalan: punt cat [ˈpuŋ ˈkat]) is a sponsored top-level domain intended to be used to highlight the Catalan language, developed by ICANN and Fundació puntCAT (now known as Accent Obert).

== History ==
Before .cat was available, and given the reluctance of certain Catalan institutions, companies, and people, to use .es, .ad, .fr, .it domains (depending on the state respectively) for their domains, alternatives emerged.

An example of this was the website for the city of Girona in Catalonia, which preferred to use a .gi domain ("ajuntament.gi", the word "ajuntament" meaning both "city council" and "town hall"), even though .gi is the country code for Gibraltar, instead of the corresponding .es as a Spanish local authority.

=== Creation ===
To solve this matter, in September 2005 the .cat TLD was approved, designed to meet the wishes and needs of the Catalan linguistic and cultural community on the Internet.

This community is made up of those who use Catalan for their online communications, and/or promote the different aspects of Catalan culture online and prefer it to any other domain.

The creation of the .cat domain was approved in September 2005. The initial registration period went from February 13, 2006, to April 21, 2006. The registry was open to everybody starting April 23, 2006.

== Registration ==
The .cat domain is not territorial, but applies to the whole Catalan-speaking community, whether or not a site is based in Catalonia. In order to be granted a .cat domain, one needs to belong to the Catalan linguistic and cultural community on the Internet.

A person, organization or company is considered to belong if they either:

- already have content in Catalan published online.
- have access to a special code (sometimes called ENS), issued during special promotions or by agreements with certain institutions.
- develop activities (in any language) to promote the Catalan culture and language.
- are endorsed by 3 people or 1 institution already using a .cat domain name.

Prominent users of the domain include but are not limited to FC Barcelona, Girona FC, Teatre Nacional de Catalunya, Ara, Museu Nacional d'Art de Catalunya and Museum of the History of Catalonia.

== Incidents ==
=== Government interference ===
In September 2017 a Spanish court ordered that all .cat domain names that were being used to promote the Catalan independence referendum shall be taken down.

On September 20 the Spanish police raided the offices of puntCAT and arrested CTO Pep Masoliver for sedition.

Following this, puntCAT released several tweets and a press statement on their website that condemned this action, calling it "shameful and degrading, unworthy of a civilized country [and] immensely disproportionate".

On October 31, 2017 several Catalan Government websites including president.cat, govern.cat and catalangovernment.eu were taken down due to the political crisis in Catalonia and due to the take over of authority by the Government of Spain.

==== Domain hacks ====
Despite the restrictions, the domain has been exploited for feline-related domain hacks, such as nyan.cat.

In September 2017, with the domain's filters weakened after the raid by Spanish police, American neo-Nazi website The Daily Stormer was briefly hosted on a .cat address.

== Impact ==
Following the success of the .cat domain, other language and culture-based domain names have emerged, such as .eus and .gal for the Basque language and culture (Euskal Herria) and the Galician language and culture (Galicia), respectively, as well as the .bzh domain-name dedicated to the Breton language and culture in Brittany.
