= GMO Internet =

Japanese internet conglomerate

GMO Internet Group, Inc.

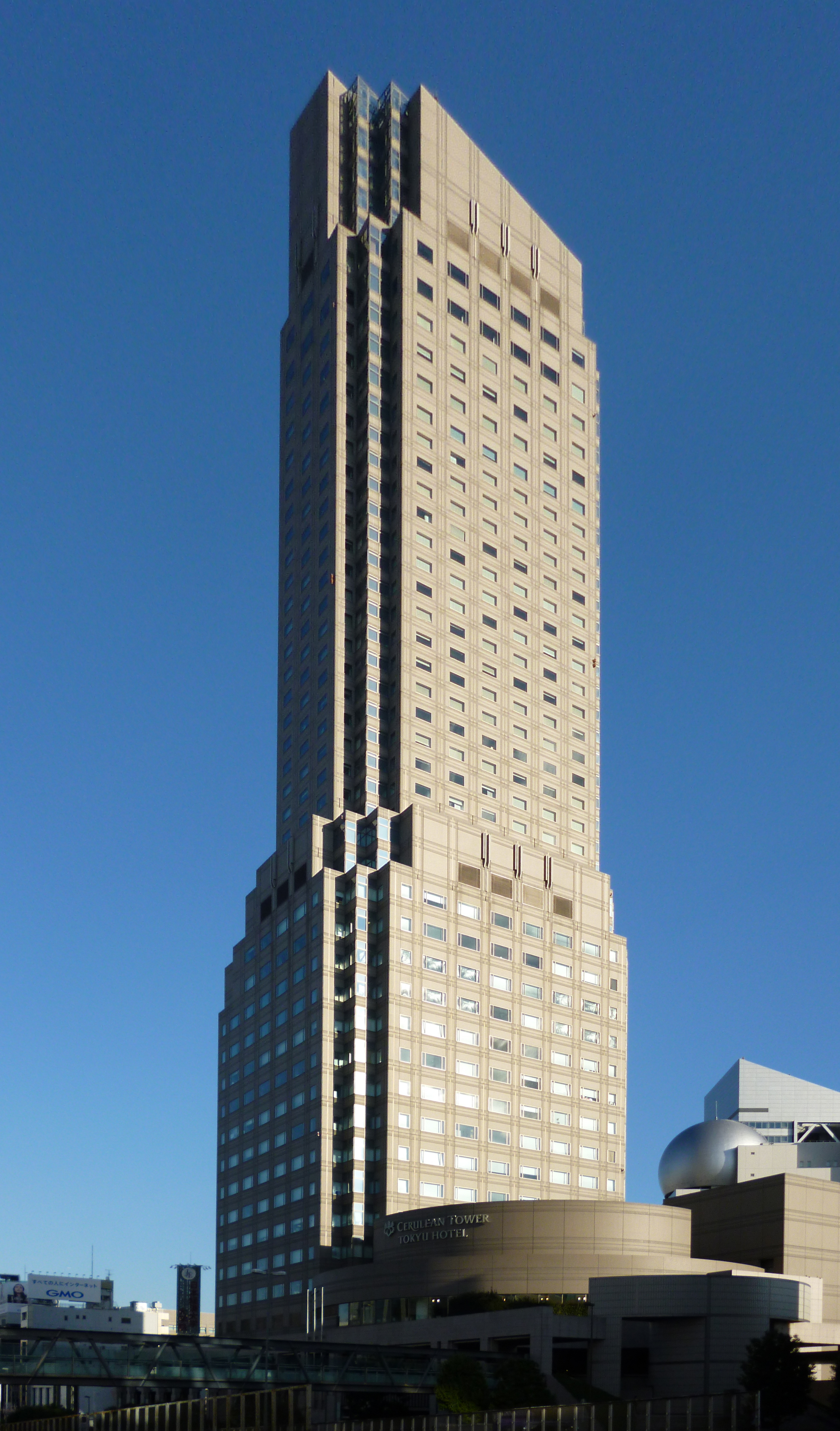
- Native name: GMOインターネットグループ株式会社
- Romanized name: GMO Intānetto Gurūpu Kabushiki-gaisha
- Formerly: Voice Media Inc. (1991–1995) interQ Inc. (1995–2001); Global Media Online, Inc. (2001–2005); GMO Internet, Inc. (2005–2022)
- Type: Public
- Traded as: 9449 (TYO)
- Industry: Information and Communication
- Founded: 24 May 1991
- Founder: Masatoshi Kumagai
- Headquarters: Tokyo, Japan
- Products: Internet Infrastructure (Domain Registrar, Domain Registry, Hosting & Cloud, Security, Payment, E-commerce Solutions, ISP), Online Advertising & Media, Internet Financial Services (FX Trading, Securities Trading), Mobile Entertainment, Cryptocurrency (Exchange, Mining)
- Revenue: JPY154 billion (2017)
- Net income: JPY8.0 billion (2017)
- Number of employees: 5,454 (2018)
- Website: https://www.gmo.jp/en/

GMO Internet Group, Inc. (GMOインターネットグループ株式会社, GMO Intānetto Gurūpu Kabushiki-gaisha) is an Internet company which is listed on the first section of the Tokyo Stock Exchange. It is also the holding company of GMO Internet Group. The head office is located in Cerulean Tower in Shibuya, Tokyo, Japan. Its founder, Masatoshi Kumagai, is now among the wealthiest in Japan with an estimated net worth of more than $1 billion as of June 2020.

== Overview ==
While GMO Internet Group is mainly engaged in the Internet infrastructure business, it also runs other businesses such as online advertising & media, Internet financial services, mobile entertainment, and cryptocurrency. It is a market leader for domain names and web hosting services in Japan. GMO Internet Group has 9 listed companies, including the head office itself. The company operates under the corporate slogan of "Internet for Everyone" and offers employee benefits such as a 24-hour staff canteen which provides free meals, childcare facilities, and so on. Furthermore, some employees also have the option to receive their salaries in bitcoin.

=== History ===
Voice Media Inc. (株式会社ボイスメディア, Kabushiki-gaisha Boisu Media) was established by Masatoshi Kumagai in May 1991. The multi-media company changed its name to interQ Inc. (インターキュー株式会社, IntāKyū Kabushiki-gaisha) in November 1995 and shifted its focus to the provision of Internet and service infrastructure. It changed its name again in April 2001 to Global Media Online, Inc. (グローバルメディアオンライン株式会社, Gurōbaru Media Onrain Kabushiki-gaisha) and then again on June 1, 2005 to GMO Internet, Inc. (GMOインターネット株式会社, GMO Intānetto Kabushiki-gaisha) before it began using its current name since September 1, 2022. In November 2013, GMO Internet acquired Gamepot, an online game company that owned Wizardry. It was shut down and absorbed into GMO Internet on December 1, 2017. On October 29, 2020, Drecom announced they had acquired Wizardry from GMO Internet.

In October 2026, the group's subsidiary GMO Internet reported unauthorised access to its Onamae.com Desktop Cloud service, involving the possible theft and misuse of customers' trading-account credentials. The subsidiary subsequently announced payments of up to ¥3 million per disclosure to customers whose information it confirmed had been published, while GMO Internet Group established a bounty fund of up to US$1 million for information identifying those involved or helping resolve the incident.

== Business Segments ==
- Domain registration (Onamae.com, Muu Muu Domain, VALUE DOMAIN, Z.com, etc.)
- Web hosting (Onamae.com rental server, GMO Cloud Public, LOLIPOP!, XREA, CORE SERVER.JP, etc.)
- Internet service provider (InterQ, ZERO, Bekkoame, GMO toku toku BB, etc.)
- SSL security (GMO GlobalSign: The "GlobalSign" brand has become a recognized global brand for SSL certification.)
- Payment service (GMO Payment Gateway, GMO Epsilon, etc.)
- Online trading (GMO CLICK Securities, FXPRIME by GMO, etc.)
- Online media (Kumapon, 9199.jp, JWord, freeml, JUGEM, etc.)
- Online search (infoQ)
- Mobile entertainment (GMO GameCenter, GMO Gamepot: Absorbed into GMO Internet on December 1, 2017)
- Cryptocurrency (GMO Coin)

== Group Companies ==
GMO Internet has a total of 106 companies worldwide, including 9 listed companies. Some of the more prominent companies are as follows.

=== Internet Infrastructure ===
- GMO Internet Group, Inc. (TYO: 9449)
- GMO Cloud K.K. (TYO: 3788)
- GMO Payment Gateway, Inc. (TYO: 3769)
- GMO Epsilon, Inc.
- GMO Pepabo, Inc. (TYO: 3633)
- GMO GlobalSign NV.
- GMO-Z.com USA Inc.
- GMO DigiRock
- GMO Brights Consulting Inc.

=== Advertising & Media ===
- GMO AD Partners Inc. (TYO: 4784)
- GMO AD Marketing Inc.
- GMO Media, Inc. (TYO: 6180)
- GMO INSIGHT INC.
- GMO NIKKO.
- GMO NIKKO AD CAMP.
- GMO UniteX Inc.
- GMO PlayAd Inc.
- GMO TECH, Inc. (TYO: 6026)
- Shift-One, Inc.
- GMO Creators Network, Inc.
- GMO Kumapon Inc.
- GMO SOLUTIONPARTNER Inc.
- GMO digitallab, Inc.
- GMO MAKESHOP Co. Ltd.
- GMO Media Inc.
- GMO Research, Inc. (TYO: 3695)

Internet Financial Services

- GMO CLICK Securities, Inc.
- GMO Financial Holdings, Inc. (TYO: 7177)
- FX PRIME by GMO Corporation

Cryptocurrency

- GMO-Z.com Switzerland AG

Others

- GMO VenturePartners, Inc.

== Z.com ==
In 2014, GMO Internet Group made headlines when it bought the Z.com domain name from Nissan for US$6.8 million. It was mentioned in their press release that Z.com was acquired to spearhead GMO Internet Group's global growth strategy and provide the group with a powerful tool to build a strong global brand.
