= .cym =

Alternate top-level domain for the Cayman Islands

.cym is a GeoTLD reserved for eventual assignment to the Cayman Islands. The primary top-level domain used by the Cayman Islands is .ky. The Islands already have the international three letter code, CYM. Internet Corporation for Assigned Names and Numbers (ICANN) plans to increase the number of generic top-level domains, and it is through this process that a .cym top-level domain might be awarded.

The Cayman Islands were previously in competition with Wales over use of the top-level domain. A campaign named "dot.CYM", not overly supported at government level, sought to have the .cym suffix for websites concerning Wales (Welsh: Cymru), the Welsh language (Welsh: Cymraeg) and Welsh culture. However, .cym was eventually assigned to the Cayman Islands because ICANN's policy states that new applications for 3-letter domains will not be accepted if they match existing ISO 3-letter codes. Wales was eventually granted the domain .cymru.

== .cymru and .wales ==
In June 2012, ICANN opened the process of applications for new top level domains. Nominet UK, which owns the .uk TLD, applied to ICANN for both .cymru and .wales.
