= MyGov =

MyGov may refer to:

- myGov, an Australian Government platform to access government services
- MyGov.in, an Indian government citizen engagement platform
- Mygov.scot, a Scottish Government public sector information website
