= .irish =

Internet top-level domain

- Introduced: March 2015
- TLD type: top-level domain
- Status: Delegated
- Intended use: Members of the Irish diaspora
- Registration restrictions: No IDNs
- DNSSEC: Yes
- Registry website: Dot-Irish

.irish is a generic top-level domain (gTLD). The rights to run the domain were applied for in June 2012 by Dot-Irish LLC, a for-profit company in California, United States, as part of an expansion of generic top-level domains by ICANN. The application was successful, and the domain opened for registrations on 17 March 2015, with public registration opened on 25 June 2015.

== See also ==
- .ie
- .cymru
- .scot
