= .ie =

Internet country-code top level domain for the Republic of Ireland

- Introduced: 27 January 1988
- TLD type: Country code top-level domain
- Status: Active
- Registry: .IE
- Sponsor: University College Dublin
- Intended use: Entities connected with Ireland
- Actual use: Popular in Ireland
- Registered domains: 331,876 (2022-12-04)
- Registration restrictions: "All applicants applying for a .ie domain name who are not situated in the 32 counties of Ireland, must demonstrate a real and substantive connection with Ireland (with the exception of those applying by means of Community Trademark)."
- Structure: Registrations are done directly at the second level.
- Documents: https://www.weare.ie/wp-content/uploads/2020/11/Registration-and-Naming-Oct-20-Clean-1.pdf
- Dispute policies: https://www.weare.ie/dispute-resolution/
- DNSSEC: Yes
- Registry website: https://www.weare.ie/

.ie is the country code top-level domain (ccTLD) which corresponds with the ISO 3166-1 alpha-2 code for Ireland. The Internet Assigned Numbers Authority (IANA) list the Computing Services Computer Centre of University College Dublin as its sponsoring organisation for the .ie domain. Since 2000 the business of administrating the domain registry has been handled by IE Domain Registry Limited. Domain name registration is open to individuals located in, or with a significant connection with, any part of the island of Ireland.

== History ==
.ie was registered on 27 January 1988 and a year later the registration of .ie domain names was delegated by Jon Postel to the Computing Services Computer Centre of University College Dublin, then headed by Dennis Jennings. In 2000, the administration of the .ie domain was sub-delegated by UCD to a new company, IE Domain Registry Limited.

The Computing Services Computer Centre of University College Dublin remains the Internet Assigned Numbers Authority's sponsoring organisation for the .ie domain.

== State regulation ==
In 2000, the Oireachtas (bicameral parliament of Ireland) enacted a law giving the Minister for Public Enterprise the power to make regulations regarding the registration of .ie domain names. In 2007 this power was transferred to the Commission for Communications Regulation (ComReg).

== Registration policy ==
The IEDR is considered more conservative than other similar authorities and places certain restrictions on registration. The .ie ccTLD is primarily a business orientated ccTLD for Irish businesses and businesses doing business in or with Ireland. It has allowed personal domain name (PDN) registrations, though these would only account for approximately 1% of the number of .ie domain registrations. An individual is allowed to register their own name or a variant of it with a utilities bill or passport as proof of entitlement.

Registration policies have been liberalised somewhat in recent years and rules such as the one against registering generic domain names have been dropped. The .ie ccTLD is a managed ccTLD where applicants for .ie domain names have to provide proof of entitlement to the domain that they want to register. In August 2017 IEDR began a consultation on removing this restriction and allowing first-come first-served registration; the requirement of a connection to Ireland will remain.

Registration is restricted to entities with a connection to Ireland. Thus, American singer Melanie was not allowed to register Melan.ie; whereas Microsoft, which has a corporate presence in Ireland, was allowed to register Modern.IE, a domain hack whose full name reflects its purpose as support for IE (Internet Explorer).

In February 2016 IEDR began a consultation on the introduction of internationalised domain names, in particular the vowel + "fada" characters (á é í ó ú) used in Irish orthography. IDN domains were launched on a phased basis starting with existing domain holders on 23 October 2016, with general availability starting on 17 November 2016.

== Registering a domain ==
The typical registration fee via accredited .ie registrars is approximately €25 (plus VAT of €5.75). Registration is free for charities registered with the Revenue Commissioners. Evidence of entitlement to the domain name (such as evidence of entitlement to use a particular business name via a Registered Business Name certificate or registered company name) and a connection with the island of Ireland are required for registration. The requirement to provide a 'claim to the name' was removed in March 2018, following public consultation.

== Second-level domains ==
There is no official second-level domain policy. A number of domain names, typically those of other TLDs, two letter domains and potentially offensive domains are forbidden from being registered. Nevertheless, the Government of Ireland began using the .gov.ie domain where once it used irlgov.ie. Some government departments continue to use their own non gov.ie domains.

Prior to 16 December 2015, two character domains consisting of one letter and one number were permitted, but two-letter domain registrations were not permitted. The only exceptions to the old two letter rule were ul.ie, which was registered by the University of Limerick before the rule came into effect, and ns.ie, which is used for the .ie name servers. The domains in the forbidden category will return a record for a WHOIS query but they are not in the .ie zone. In June 2015, the IEDR announced that two-letter names would soon be available; a 30-day registration began in November for a go-live date of 16 December 2015. Where there were multiple applicants for a given combination, an auction was held in early 2016.

== Number of registered domains ==
As of October 2025, there were 332,297 registered .ie domain names. This has surpassed the number of Irish-owned and or hosted .com domain names. It is the preferred extension for new Irish businesses. Approximately 140 new .ie domains are registered each working day.

== See also ==
- .irish, a generic top-level domain (gTLD) for the global Irish community.
- .cymru
- .scot
- HEAnet
- INEX
- ITnet
