= Mygov.scot =

mygov.scot

- Screenshot
- Website type: Government information
- Available in: English
- Owner: Scottish Government
- Creator: Scottish Government
- Website: www.mygov.scot
- Commercial: No
- Registration: No
- Launched: 12 September 2014
- Current status: Online
- Content license: Crown copyright Open Government Licence

mygov.scot is a Scottish Government public sector information website. The site has been created to provide a single point of access to central government services in a way that is “easy to find and simple to use.”. The website is replacing older Scottish Government websites as part of a rolling transitioning project, removing duplication of content.

The site was one of the initial launch partners for the .scot top-level domain.

The site became available as a public alpha test from 12 September 2014. The site officially replaced DirectScot.org on 12 May 2015 and the Scottish Business Portal (business.scotland.gov.uk) on 14 September 2015.

The new Victims’ Code for Scotland, which sets out the rights of victims of crime, is hosted on the site.
