= IE Domain Registry =

Internet namespace administrator

The .IE is the domain name registry for the .ie country code top-level domain. Their work includes protecting, supporting and promoting the web presence of all .ie domain names. They administer and manage the .ie namespace in the public interest.

Founded in 1991, they spun out of UCD and became a private company in July 2000. While still operating as an independent private company, they liaise with government departments, governing bodies, trade associations as required and abide by internet best practice principles. They have no shareholders and are owned by the directors. Being limited by guarantee is a common structure for global domain registries. Surpluses are added to opening reserves. Directors don’t have a beneficial interest in the reserves of the company.

They operate on a not-for-profit basis and are a member of the Council of European National Top-Level Domain Registries (CENTR). They are also a member of the Internet Neutral Exchange and of the RIPE NCC.

The IE Domain Registry operates a managed registry model for Ireland's national .ie domain. This means that every application for a .ie domain name is checked to make sure that the applicant has a real connection with Ireland. Applicants can provide just one document to prove identity and connection to Ireland. Information on supporting documentation is outlined here.

The .ie ccTLD has a Registry – Registrar model. Becoming a .ie Registrar requires that the applicant has over 200 registered .ie domains or is at least the billing contact on over 200 .ie domains, provides a 2,500 Euro bond, passes a credit check and has a demonstrable knowledge of IE Domain Registry domain naming policies and technical procedures.

In 2004, The Commission for Communications Regulation (Comreg) was to take over the regulation and control of Ireland's domain name .ie.The legislation covering this change was signed into law in 2007. In effect, the move has ComReg regulating while IE Domain Registry continues to run the .ie ccTLD.

In March 2006, IE Domain Registry, the company leading the IENUM consortium, won the competition to provide a commercial registry for the supply of ENUM (Electronic Numbering) services in Ireland. The IE Domain Registry's partner in the IENUM consortium is Internet Privatstiftung Austria (IPA), the Austrian organisation which operates the .at domain name and provided the first ENUM commercial registry service in the world.

In 2014, the Policy Advisory Committee (PAC) was set up by the Board of IE Domain Registry. The PAC was set up to provide advice on policy issues concerning Ireland’s Internet top-level domain, .ie. The PAC makes formal recommendations to the Board for approval.

The PAC follow a 10-step framework known as the .ie Policy Development Process (PDP). The PDP is designed to be bottom-up and consensus-driven. This means that anyone can suggest a policy change and if there is agreement amongst stakeholders, the policy change can be implemented. Further information on the PDP can be found here.

The PAC has supported the below policy change requests:-

Policy Proposal Name	Date of Policy Change Implementation
To permit the registration of 1 & 2 letter .ie domains	16-May-16
To permit the registration of Internationalised Domain Names (IDNs) – acute accent / fada character on the vowels – á, é, í, ó, ú	17-Nov-16
To permit the sale and resale of .ie domains (secondary market)	19-Nov-16
To delete section 3.6 of the IEDR Naming Policy – ‘Geographic Rule’ which prevented the registration of Irish geographical place names	20-Dec-16
To remove the policy requirement to provide proof of a claim to the .ie domain name as a pre-condition within the IEDR Registration & Naming Policy	12-Apr-18
To update the Policies of the .ie namespace for compliance with the EU General Data Protection Regulation (GDPR). Note that this change relates to 3 distinct policy changes (WHOIS, Privacy and Retention)	25-May-18
To alter the operation of the DNS technical check process to ensure that incorrectly configured DNS records do not delay the completion of ticket requests	28-Nov-18
To alter the .ie Registration and Naming Policy to remove the registration restriction on .ie domains corresponding to TLD extensions	04-Jul-19
To introduce an alternative dispute resolution (ADR) process to the .ie namespace	04-Jul-19
Policy change request to alter the .ie WHOIS Policy to mandate Registrar use of the WHOIS abuse contact	30-Apr-20

The Terms of Reference for the Policy Advisory Committee (PAC), including the PAC membership of eligible organisations, can be found here:

· Terms of Reference

· Members of the PAC

The PAC has held four public consultations to gather the opinions of the wider Irish internet community and to ensure that these are taken into consideration during the policy development process. The PAC has also held four additional consultations with other stakeholders deemed to be most impacted by policy change requests to ensure their input is considered.

IE Domain Registry has modernised the registration process over the last number of years. Registering a .ie domain is now more automated with .ie registrations typically going live within an hour or less during weekdays. A web interface for .ie Registrars and an API which enables them to integrate .ie registration procedures with their systems are partially responsible for the more efficient registration process.

The rules for registering .ie domain names were changed on 21 March 2018. This change removed the need to explain why an applicant wants a particular name (also called ‘claim to the name’) when registering a .ie domain name. This made the registration process easier and faster.

Previously, an applicant registering a .ie domain had to prove they had a valid claim to the desired domain and a real, tangible connection to the island of Ireland. Those registering a .ie domain still have to prove their connection to Ireland but no longer need to explain their claim to a name.

IE Domain Registry acted as a ‘Registrar of last resort’ for individuals and companies who for whatever reason, chose not to deal directly with a Registrar. On 31 March 2020, the direct registration service was terminated. On this date, all direct customers were transferred to an accredited .ie Registrar, 101 Domain. 101 Domain was selected after a transparent tender and independently managed auction process.

The drivers for this decision included the declining size of the direct portfolio, the fact that it is common practice in the ccTLD sector - registries are selling/exiting (incl. Finland, Sweden & UK), and IE Domain Registry could not grow the direct portfolio, given its self-imposed restrictions on marketing/promotion motivated by the need to avoid even the perception of competition with Registrars.

In the context of requiring Directs to transfer, IE Domain Registry was satisfied that there would be no adverse issues arising or risks regarding consumer choice, efficient markets and intensity of competition:-

· There are over ~130 accredited. ie Registrars, providing a range of services, with bundled options and at differing price points.

· There is a mix of national and international Registrars, and many are ICANN accredited

· Efficient market exits – with strong, ethical, professional Registrars

· A ‘Registrar of last resort service’ is not needed in Ireland

== ComReg Takes Over IEDR Policy Functions ==
Under the Communication Regulations (Amendment) Bill 2007, the Communications Regulator (ComReg) has taken over most of the policy functions of IEDR. The legislation was passed by the Oireachtas and came into force on 15 May 2007 with the signing of the Communications Regulation (Amendment) Act, 2007 (Commencement) Order, 2007 – (S.I. No. 224 of 2007).

According to the Regulatory Impact Analysis, the legislation puts in place legal instruments for the regulation of the private sector company (IEDR) which is currently administrating .ie ccTLD. This move to protect the .ie ccTLD and provide the mechanisms to transfer the administration of .ie ccTLD away from IEDR if required makes this legislation very powerful and effectively changes IEDR to being a service company from its previous position of making policy and administrating the .ie ccTLD.

The legislation gives ComReg complete power over .ie ccTLD policy decisions: designating the authority to register .ie domains; setting renewal periods and conditions; revoking registrations, registration conditions; pricing of .ie domains and appeals against revocation of registrations. IEDR, however, still provides the day-to-day administration of .ie ccTLD.

- Communication Regulations (Amendment) Bill 2007
- Regulatory Impact Analysis

== See also ==
- Communications in Ireland
