= Council of European National Top Level Domain Registries =

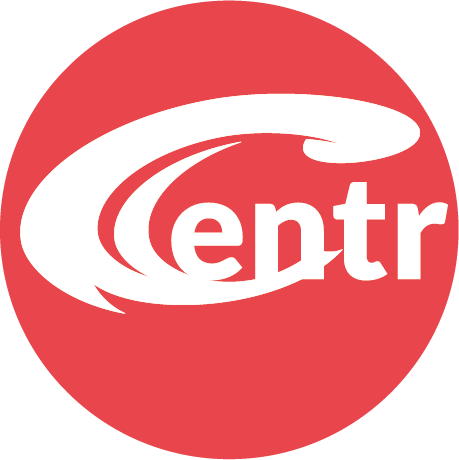
CENTR logo

The Council of European National Top-Level Domain Registries (CENTR) is an organization established to act as a peak body of top-level domain name registries.

The organisation was formed in 1998, created as a project of the RIPE Top-level Domain Working Group.

As the largest organisation of its kind, it is often called upon to give the view of country-code registries to organisations such as ICANN, the European Commission, the United Nations and the International Telecommunication Union. Internally, it is responsible for information sharing between registries, as well as identifying best practices for the industry.

== Membership ==
Its members are solely registry organisations such as Nominet UK, IE Domain Registry, and DENIC.

Despite its name, membership of the organisation is not limited to the European region, and members include the operators of .us, .ca, .nz, .jp and .af. See Category:Council of European National Top Level Domain Registries members for a complete list of member domains.
