= .scot =

Internet top-level domain

- Introduced: Pioneer phase launched on 15 July 2014. Delegated to the root in June 2014; First proposed in 2000.
- TLD type: GeoTLD
- Status: General registrations beginning on 23 September 2014, registrations open for interest and trademark holders from 15 July 2014.
- Intended use: Scotland, Scottish culture, Gaelic and Scots languages
- Registration restrictions: Requires connection to Scotland or Scottish culture.
- DNSSEC: Yes
- Registry website: dot.scot

.scot is a GeoTLD for Scotland and Scottish culture, including the Gaelic and Scots languages.

The case for a Scottish TLD began in the 1990s. Originally, .sco was proposed in a campaign.

In 2008 dotCYMRU, dotEUS, dotSCOT and dotBZH formed ECLID. Later it was decided to allow newly proposed top-level domains for introduction some time in 2013, and a list of applications for these was published in June 2012; the domain .scot was included.

On 27 January 2014, dotScot Registry, a not-for-profit organisation established in 2009, announced that it had agreed terms to operate the .scot domain name, with plans to get it up and running later in summer of 2014.

On 15 July 2014, .scot was officially launched. The first .scot domain name to go live was calico.scot, registered by hosting company Calico Internet Ltd.

On 17 February 2015, the Scottish Government migrated its website from Scotland.gov.uk to gov.scot. Likewise, the Scottish Parliament moved from Scottish.parliament.uk to parliament.scot in May 2016, to coincide with the 2016 elections.

The 2017 Global Amendment to the base New GeoTLD Registry Agreement is effective as of 31 July 2017.

On 3 May 2018 the dotScot Registry lifted registration restrictions on locality domains (based on towns, etc.) and other premium names.

== See also ==
- .ie
- .irish
- .cymru
