= .wales =

Top-level domain for Wales

- Introduced: 2014
- TLD type: GeoTLD
- Status: Available September 2014
- Intended use: Wales
- Actual use: Gets some use in Wales where the content language is English
- Registration restrictions: None
- Documents: Policies
- Dispute policies: UDRP
- DNSSEC: Yes
- Registry website: Nominet: Cymru - Wales and Our Home Online (Domain for Wales)

.wales is one of two geographic top level domains for Wales (the other being .cymru).

== Proposal and use ==
.wales and .cymru were put forth by Nominet UK in 2012. Final approval for both top level domains for Wales was granted by ICANN in June 2014.

On 30 September 2014, the Llywydd of the Senedd officially moved Senedd websites and other sites to new ".cymru" and ".wales" domains which are geographic top-level domains specific to Wales. Wales Online, Daily Post, the Welsh Rugby Union, the Millennium Stadium, Golwg360, Bloc, Gwalia, Atlantic PLC, Orchard and Portmeirion were among others who also switched over to the domains. These became available to all on St David's Day 2015.

A phased launch of the new domains was scheduled, with trademark holders being eligible to apply initially. General availability was expected by the spring of 2015. Early adopters of the domains include the Welsh Government and male voice choir Only Men Aloud!.
