= Wales =

Country within the United Kingdom

Wales Cymru (Welsh)
- Flag Royal Badge
- Anthem: None officially; "Hen Wlad Fy Nhadau" (de facto) ("Land of My Fathers")
- Location of Wales (dark green) – in Europe (green & dark grey) – in the United Kingdom (green)
- Status: Country
- Capital and largest city: Cardiff; 51°29′N 3°11′W
- Official languages: English (de facto); Welsh
- Ethnic groups (2021): List: 93.8% White; 2.9% Asian; 1.6% Mixed; 0.9% Black; 0.9% other
- Religion (2021): List: 46.5% no religion; 43.6% Christianity; 2.2% Islam; 0.4% Hinduism; 0.3% Buddhism; 0.1% Sikhism; 0.1% Judaism; 0.5% other; 6.3% not stated
- Demonym: Welsh (Cymry)
- Sovereign state; Legal jurisdiction: United Kingdom; England and Wales
- Government: Devolved parliamentary government within a parliamentary constitutional monarchy
  - Monarch: Charles III
  - First Minister: Rhun ap Iorwerth

Parliament of the United Kingdom
  - Secretary of State: Stephen Kinnock
  - House of Commons: 32 MPs (of 650)
- Legislature: Senedd

Formation
  - Unified by Gruffydd ap Llywelyn: 1057
  - Statute of Rhuddlan: 3 March 1284
  - Laws in Wales Acts 1535 and 1542: 1543
  - Welsh Language Act 1967: 27 July 1967
  - Devolution: 1 July 1999 (Note: Date powers transferred to National Assembly)

Area
  - Total (Note: ONS Standard Area Measurement, 'total extent of the realm' (area to mean low water)): 21,218 km^{2} (8,192 sq mi)
  - Land (Note: ONS Standard Area Measurement, 'area to mean high water excluding inland water'): 20,737 km^{2} (8,007 sq mi)

Population
  - 2025 estimate: 3,175,181
  - 2021 census: 3,107,494
  - Density: 153/km^{2} (396.3/sq mi)
- GVA: 2023 estimate
  - Total: £81.5 billion
  - Per capita: £25,742
- GDP (nominal): 2023 estimate
  - Total: £92.8 billion
  - Per capita: £29,316
- HDI (2022): ▲0.910 very high
- Currency: Sterling (Note: Commonly also known as the "pound" (the name of its base unit) or "pound sterling".) (GBP; £)
- Time zone: UTC+0 (GMT)
  - Summer (DST): UTC+1 (BST)
- Date format: dd/mm/yyyy (AD)
- Calling code: +44
- ISO 3166 code: GB-WLS
- Internet TLD: .wales .cymru .uk (Note: Both .wales and .cymru are not ccTLDs, but GeoTLDs, open to use by all people in Wales and related to Wales. .uk as part of the United Kingdom is also used. ISO 3166-1 is GB, but .gb is unused.)

Wales (Welsh: Cymru [ˈkəmrɨ]) is a country that is part of the United Kingdom. Located on the island of Great Britain, it is bordered by the Irish Sea to the north and west, England to the east, the Bristol Channel to the south, and the Celtic Sea to the south-west. As of 2021, it had a population of 3.1 million. It has a total area of 21,218 square kilometres (8,192 sq mi) and over 2,700 kilometres (1,680 mi) of coastline. It is largely mountainous with its higher peaks in the north and central areas, including Snowdon (Yr Wyddfa), its highest summit. The country lies within the north temperate zone and has a changeable, maritime climate. Its capital and largest city is Cardiff.

A distinct Welsh culture emerged among the Celtic Britons after the Roman withdrawal from Britain in the 5th century, and Wales was briefly united under Gruffudd ap Llywelyn in 1055. After over 200 years of war, the conquest of Wales was completed by King Edward I of England in 1283, though Owain Glyndŵr led the Welsh Revolt against English rule in the early 15th century, and briefly re-established an independent Welsh state with its own national parliament (Welsh: senedd). In the 16th century the whole of Wales was annexed by England and incorporated within the English legal system under the Laws in Wales Acts 1535 and 1542. Distinctive Welsh politics developed in the 19th century. Welsh Liberalism, exemplified in the late 19th and early 20th century by David Lloyd George, was displaced by the growth of socialism and the Labour Party. Welsh national feeling grew over the century: a nationalist party, Plaid Cymru, was formed in 1925, and Cymdeithas yr Iaith Gymraeg, the Welsh language society, in 1962. A governing system of Welsh devolution is employed in Wales, of which the most major step was the formation of the Senedd (Welsh Parliament, formerly the National Assembly for Wales) in 1998, responsible for a range of devolved policy matters.

At the dawn of the Industrial Revolution, development of the mining and metallurgical industries transformed the country from an agricultural society into an industrial one; the South Wales Coalfield's exploitation caused a rapid expansion of Wales's population. Two-thirds of the population live in South Wales, including Cardiff, Swansea, Newport, and the nearby valleys. The eastern region of North Wales has about a sixth of the overall population, with Wrexham being the largest northern city. The remaining parts of Wales are sparsely populated. Since the decline of the country's traditional extractive and heavy industries, the public sector, light and service industries, and tourism play major roles in its economy. Agriculture in Wales is largely livestock-based, making Wales a net exporter of animal produce, contributing towards national agricultural self-sufficiency.

Both Welsh and English are official languages. A majority of the population of Wales speaks English. Welsh is the dominant language in parts of the north and west, with a total of 538,300 Welsh speakers across the entire country. Wales has four UNESCO world heritage sites, of which three are in the north.

== Etymology ==
The English words Wales and Welsh derive from the same Old English root (singular Wealh, plural Wēalas), a descendant of Proto-Germanic *Walhaz, which was itself derived from the name of the Gauls known to the Romans as Volcae. This term was later used to refer indiscriminately to inhabitants of the Western Roman Empire. Anglo-Saxons came to use the term to refer to the Britons in particular; the plural form Wēalas evolved into the name for their territory, Wales. Historically in Britain, the words were not restricted to modern Wales or to the Welsh but were used to refer to anything that Anglo-Saxons associated with Britons, including other non-Germanic territories in Britain (e.g. Cornwall) and places in Anglo-Saxon territory associated with Britons (e.g. Walworth in County Durham and Walton in West Yorkshire).

The modern Welsh name for themselves is Cymry, and Cymru is the Welsh name for Wales. These words (both of which are pronounced [ˈkəm.rɨ]) are descended from the Brythonic word combrogi, meaning 'fellow-countrymen', and probably came into use before the 7th century. In literature, they could be spelt Kymry or Cymry, regardless of whether it referred to the people or their homeland. The Latinised forms of these names, Cambrian, Cambric and Cambria, survive as names such as the Cambrian Mountains and the Cambrian geological period.

== History ==
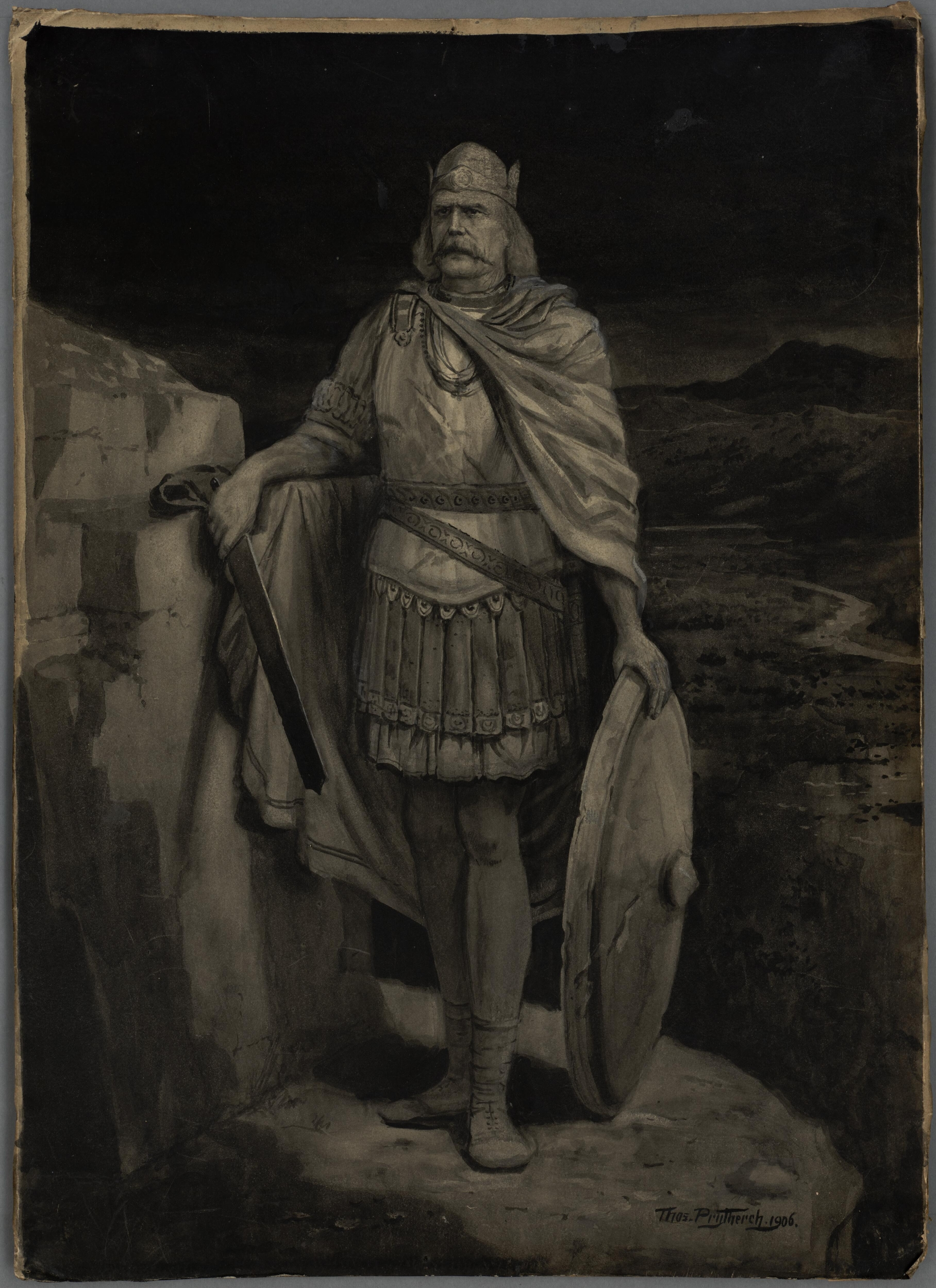
Caradog (depicted by Thomas Prydderch), leader of the north Wales Celtic tribe the Ordovices.

Although the Welsh nation did not arise until the Middle Ages, the territory of Wales was permanently settled from the end of the last ice age onwards. These first farmers left many impressive funerary monuments, as well as settlement sites that speak to a dispersed culture. With the arrival of the Bronze Age, the Great Orme in North Wales became Britain's premier producer of copper, one of the key ores for smelting bronze. It is likely that the wealth of mineral resources in Britain, and especially Wales, attracted the Roman invasion, but by this time the island had become distinctively Celtic in culture, and the Neolithic population was largely replaced. It was this Iron Age Celtic culture, and their common language, that were called the Britons by the Romans.

With the departure of the Romans, Britain fractured into various kingdoms. Despite this, there is a sense in which the Roman withdrawal of 383 created a post-Roman nation of Britons, with Magnus Maximus proclaimed Roman emperor in Britannia and Gaul. Although long before the term Cymry (the Welsh term for the Welsh) had been adopted, the concept of a British people, from which the Welsh would emerge, was created here.

Encroachment by Germanic Anglo-Saxon settlers gradually displaced the indigenous culture and language of the Britons, and one group of these Britons became isolated by the geography of the western peninsula, bounded by the sea and English neighbours. It was these English neighbours who named the land Wallia, and the people Welsh.

The people of Wallia, medieval Wales, remained divided into separate kingdoms that fought with each other as much as they fought their English neighbours. Neither were the communities homogeneously Welsh. Place name, historical records and archaeological evidence point to coastal Viking/Norse settlement in places such as Swansea, Fishguard and Anglesey, and Saxons settled inland amongst the Welsh in places such as Presteigne.

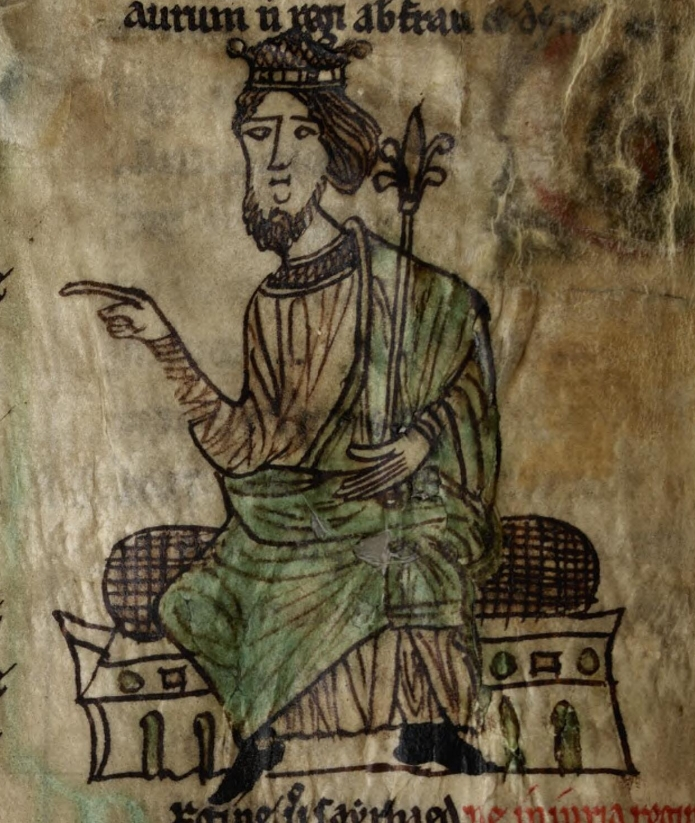
Hywel Dda enthroned

In the 10th century, Hywel ap Cadell, later known as Hywel Dda, formed the kingdom of Deheubarth from inheritances in Dyfed and Seisyllwg, and then gained control of the kingdoms of Gwynedd and Powys in 942. With control of nearly all the territory of Wales, he codified Welsh law, a law code that survived the later fracture of his kingdom, and that became a significant step in the creation of the nation. With a common culture and an external threat, the kingdoms of Wales began to see themselves as one people.

A century later the Kingdom of Gwynedd was in ascendency, and Gruffydd ap Llywelyn subdued all opposition by 1057, becoming the only king to unite all of Wales, and parts of England on the border. "Thus, from about 1057 until his death in 1063, the whole of Wales recognised the kingship of Gruffydd ap Llywelyn. For about seven brief years, Wales was one, under one ruler, a feat with neither precedent nor successor."

The kingdom did not last, and Gruffydd met his death as a result of a surprise attack by Tostig, brother of the English King, Harold. After Gruffydd's death, Harold married his widow, but she would be widowed again by the Norman invasion of England in 1066.

The Normans followed their invasion of England with incursions into Wales, forming the semi-independent Norman Welsh marches (from the French for borderlands), and dividing them from the unconquered Pura Wallia. The fortunes of Welsh marcher lords and various Welsh princes ebbed and flowed, until Llywelyn ab Iorwerth (Llywelyn the Great) forced all other Welsh princes to submit to him in 1216. Following his death, Wales was divided once again. It was later reunified by his grandson, Llywelyn ap Gruffudd, whose supremacy was recognised by King Henry III of England in the 1267 Treaty of Montgomery, granting him the title Prince of Wales.

Relations with Henry's successor, Edward I, broke down and led to a war of conquest, concluding in 1283 with English victory. The following year the statute of Rhuddlan ended Welsh independence. Wales was divided between principality, ruled by Edward; and the marches, ruled by feudal marcher lords. This persisted, despite the Welsh rebellion under Owain Glyndŵr of 1400–1415, until the rise of the Tudors, with Welsh support. With the Laws in Wales Acts of Henry VIII, the Welsh became full citizens in the Kingdom of England, with parliamentary representation. The Welsh border was also formally defined and the territory reunited.

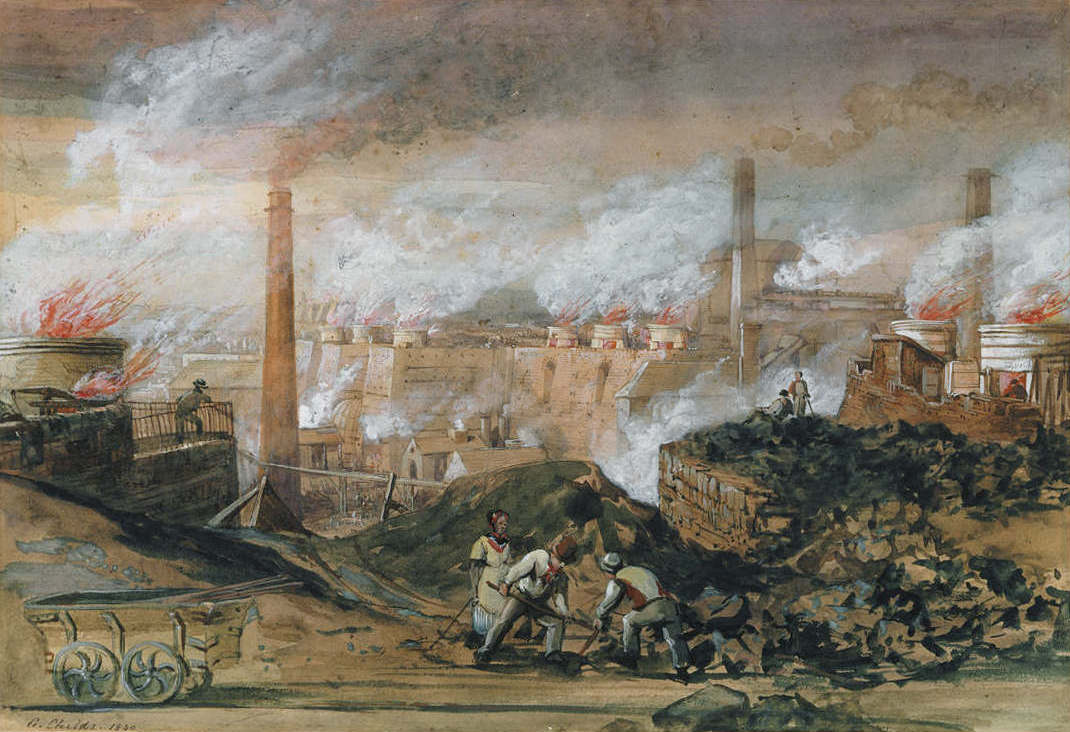
Dowlais Ironworks by George Childs (1840)

The Act of Union 1707 created the Kingdom of Great Britain. During the 18th and 19th centuries, the Industrial Revolution and the beginning of the British Empire led to a significant increase in mining and exploitation of Welsh natural materials such as metal, coal and slate. The population of Wales expanded rapidly and Wales moved to the centre of the British economy, but the changes bred resentment, this time towards industrialists and not the English state. Meanwhile, a series of religious revivals transformed the character of the nation, beginning a tradition of non-conformism. This carried over into the political sphere too. The rapid industrialisation of parts of Wales gave rise to strong and radical Welsh working class movements which led to the Merthyr Rising of 1831, the widespread support for Chartism, and the Newport Rising of 1839. Strong liberal traditions were forged and later replaced by socialism. Since 1922 Wales has voted Labour in every general election.

From the mid 19th century until 1914, Wales experienced a strengthened political culture, religious and cultural revival, renewed interest in Welsh literature, the revival of Eisteddfodau. There was a thriving economy, a renewed interest in Welsh language, and music, non-conformist Christianity and the emergence of strong national identity, along with the founding of many national institutions. However, the period also saw the publication of a report on education that became known as the Treachery of the Blue Books. The report blamed Welsh language and non-conformism for poor educational standards. This fed the rise of the Welsh nationalist movement, expressed in the Cymru Fydd movement, which advocated for greater autonomy and recognition of Welsh identity within the United Kingdom. Calls for devolution grew over the course of a century, and the Government of Wales Act 1998 created a devolved Welsh assembly for the first time, now renamed the Senedd or Welsh Parliament.

== Geography ==
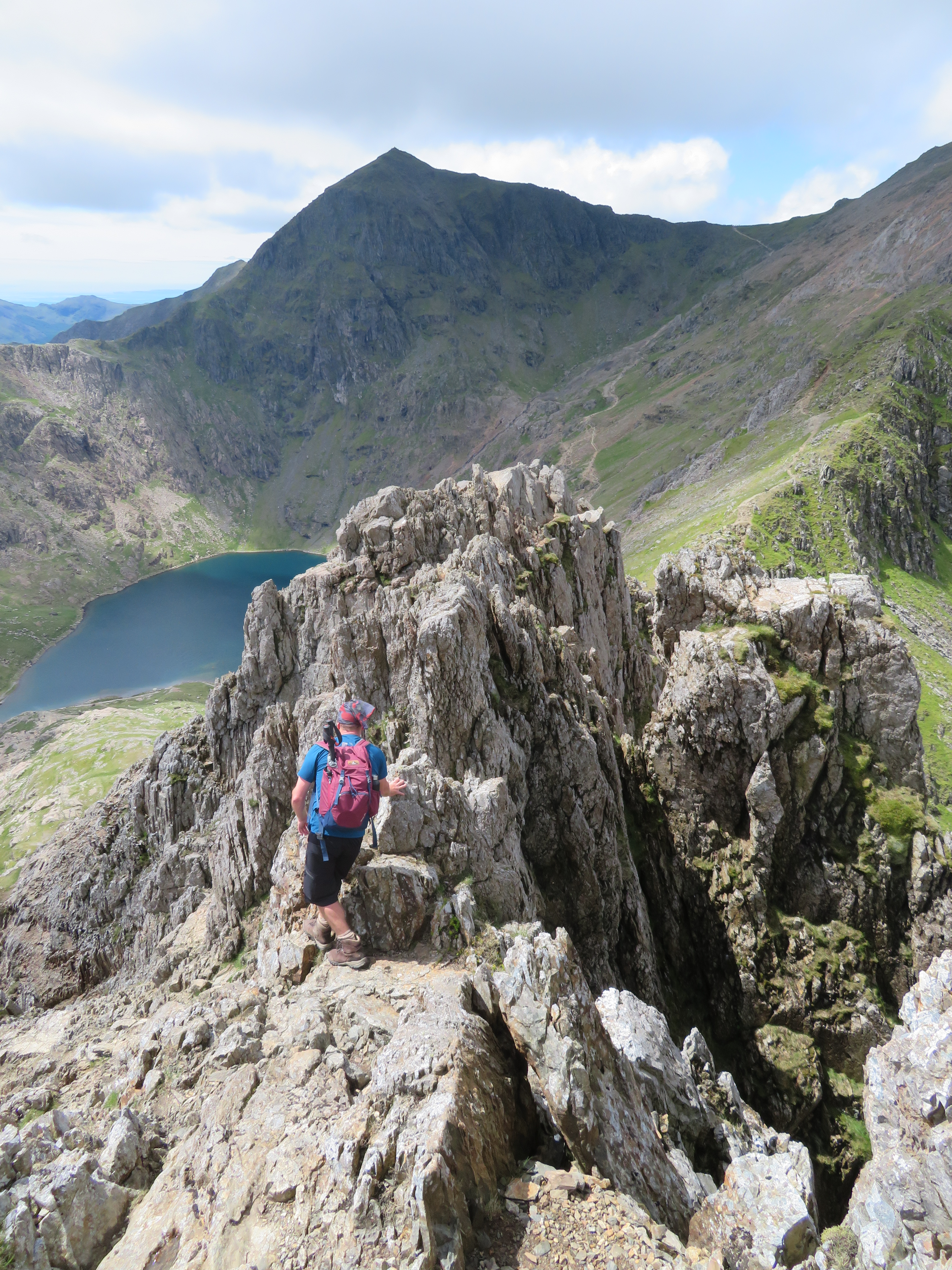
Snowdon (Welsh: Yr Wyddfa) Gwynedd, the highest mountain in Wales

Wales is a generally mountainous country on the western side of central southern Great Britain. It is about 170 miles (270 km) north to south. The oft-quoted "size of Wales" is about 20,779 km^{2} (8,023 sq mi). Wales is bordered by England to the east and by sea in all other directions: the Irish Sea to the north and west, St George's Channel and the Celtic Sea to the southwest and the Bristol Channel to the south. Wales has about 1,680 miles (2,700 km) of coastline (along the mean high water mark), including the mainland, Anglesey and Holyhead. Over 50 islands lie off the Welsh mainland, the largest being Anglesey, in the north-west.

Much of Wales's diverse landscape is mountainous, particularly in the north and central regions. The mountains were shaped during the last ice age, the Devensian glaciation. The highest mountains in Wales are in Snowdonia (Eryri), of which five are over 1,000 m (3,300 ft). The highest of these is Snowdon (Yr Wyddfa), at 1,085 m (3,560 ft). The 14 Welsh mountains, or 15 if including Carnedd Gwenllian – often discounted because of its low topographic prominence – over 3,000 feet (910 metres) high are known collectively as the Welsh 3000s and are located in a small area in the north-west. The highest outside the 3000s is Aran Fawddwy, at 905 metres (2,969 feet), in the south of Snowdonia. The Brecon Beacons (Bannau Brycheiniog) are in the south (highest point Pen y Fan, at 886 metres (2,907 feet)), and are joined by the Cambrian Mountains in Mid Wales (highest point Pumlumon, at 752 metres (2,467 feet)).

Relief map of the three national parks of Wales

Wales has three national parks: Snowdonia, Brecon Beacons, and Pembrokeshire Coast (Arfordir Penfro). It has five Areas of Outstanding Natural Beauty: Anglesey, the Clwydian Range and Dee Valley, the Gower Peninsula, the Llŷn Peninsula, and the Wye Valley. The Gower Peninsula was the first area in the United Kingdom to be designated as an Area of Outstanding Natural Beauty, in 1956. As of 2019, the coastline of Wales had 40 Blue Flag beaches, three Blue Flag marinas and one Blue Flag boat operator. The south and west coasts of Wales, along with the Irish and Cornish coasts, are frequently blasted by Atlantic westerlies/south-westerlies that, over the years, have sunk and wrecked many vessels. In 1859 over 110 ships were destroyed off the coast of Wales in a hurricane that saw more than 800 lives lost across Britain. The greatest single loss occurred with the sinking of the Royal Charter off Anglesey in which 459 people died. The 19th century saw over 100 vessels lost with an average loss of 78 sailors per year. Wartime action caused losses near Holyhead, Milford Haven and Swansea. Because of offshore rocks and unlit islands, Anglesey and Pembrokeshire are still notorious for shipwrecks, most notably the Sea Empress oil spill in 1996.

The first border between Wales and England was zonal, apart from around the River Wye, which was the first accepted boundary. Offa's Dyke was supposed to form an early distinct line, but this was thwarted by Gruffudd ap Llewellyn, who reclaimed swathes of land beyond the dyke. The Act of Union 1536 formed a linear border stretching from the mouth of the Dee to the mouth of the Wye. Even after the Act of Union, many of the borders remained vague and moveable until the Sunday Closing (Wales) Act 1881, which forced local businesses to decide which country they fell within to accept either the Welsh or English law.

=== Geology ===
The earliest geological period of the Palaeozoic era, the Cambrian, takes its name from the Cambrian Mountains, where geologists first identified Cambrian remnants. In the mid-19th century, Roderick Murchison and Adam Sedgwick used their studies of Welsh geology to establish certain principles of stratigraphy and palaeontology. The next two periods of the Palaeozoic era, the Ordovician and Silurian, were named after ancient Celtic tribes from this area.

=== Climate ===
Wales

Climate chart (precipitation, max. and min. temperature)
J	F	M	A	M	J	J	A	S	O	N	D
159 7 1	114 7 1	119 9 2	86 11 3	81 15 6	86 17 9	78 19 11	106 19 11	124 16 9	153 13 7	157 9 4	173 7 2
- █ Average max. and min. temperatures in °C
- █ Precipitation totals in mm
- Source: Met Office
Imperial conversion
J	F	M	A	M	J	J	A	S	O	N	D
6.2 44 34	4.5 44 34	4.7 47 36	3.4 52 38	3.2 58 43	3.4 62 47	3.1 66 52	4.2 66 51	4.9 61 48	6 55 44	6.2 49 39	6.8 45 36
- █ Average max. and min. temperatures in °F
- █ Precipitation totals in inches

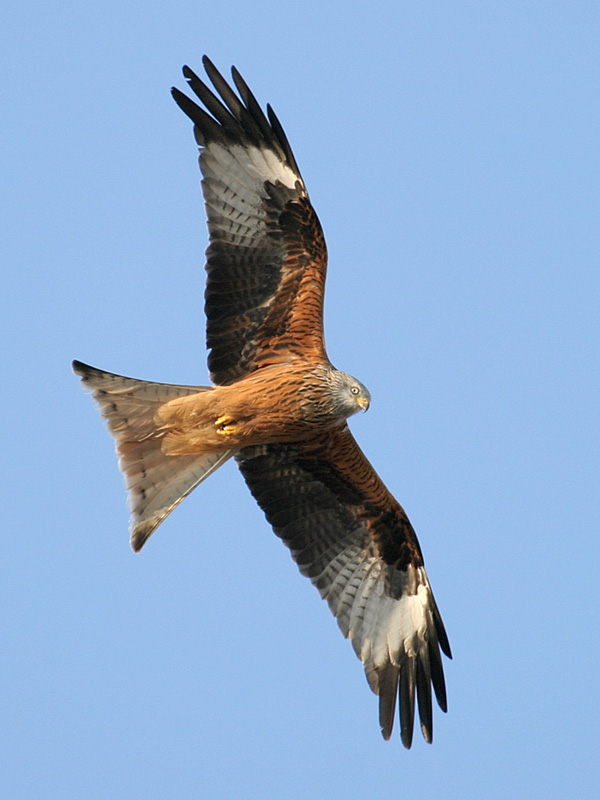
A Red kite, considered one of the national symbols of Wales and voted the nation's favourite bird

Wales lies within the north temperate zone. It has a changeable, maritime climate and is one of the wettest countries in Europe. Welsh weather is often cloudy, wet and windy, with warm summers and mild winters.

- Highest maximum temperature: 37.1 °C (99 °F) at Hawarden, Flintshire on 18 July 2022.
- Lowest minimum temperature: −23.3 °C (−10 °F) at Rhayader, Radnorshire (now Powys) on 21 January 1940.
- Maximum number of hours of sunshine in a month: 354.3 hours at Dale Fort, Pembrokeshire in July 1955.
- Minimum number of hours of sunshine in a month: 2.7 hours at Llwynon, Brecknockshire in January 1962.
- Maximum rainfall in a day (0900 UTC – 0900 UTC): 211 millimetres (8.3 in) at Rhondda, Glamorgan, on 11 November 1929.
- Wettest spot – an average of 4,473 millimetres (176 in) rain a year at Crib Goch in Snowdonia, Gwynedd (making it also the wettest spot in the United Kingdom).

=== Flora and fauna ===
Wales's wildlife is typical of Britain with several distinctions. Because of its long coastline, Wales hosts a variety of seabirds. The coasts and surrounding islands are home to colonies of gannets, Manx shearwater, puffins, kittiwakes, shags and razorbills. In comparison, with 60 per cent of Wales above the 150m contour, the country also supports a variety of upland-habitat birds, including raven and ring ouzel. Birds of prey include the merlin, hen harrier and the red kite, a national symbol of Welsh wildlife. In total, more than 200 different species of bird have been seen at the RSPB reserve at Conwy, including seasonal visitors. Larger mammals, including brown bears, wolves and wildcats, died out during the Norman period. Today, mammals include shrews, voles, badgers, otters, stoats, weasels, hedgehogs and fifteen species of bat. Two species of small rodent, the yellow-necked mouse and the dormouse, are of special Welsh note being found at the historically undisturbed border area. The pine marten, which has been sighted occasionally, has been reintroduced in parts of Wales since 2015, having previously not been officially recorded since the 1950s. The polecat was nearly driven to extinction in Britain, but hung on in Wales and is now rapidly spreading. Feral goats can be found in Snowdonia. In March 2021, Natural Resources Wales (NRW) granted a licence to release up to six beavers in the Dyfi Valley, the first official beaver release in Wales.

Believed to be home to some of Wales's rarest land invertebrates, some 2,500 disused coal tips are the subject of study by the Welsh Government; the tips are home to a wide variety of other wildlife.

The waters of south-west Wales of Gower, Pembrokeshire, and Cardigan Bay attract marine animals, including basking sharks, Atlantic grey seals, leatherback turtles, dolphins, porpoises, jellyfish, crabs and lobsters. Pembrokeshire and Ceredigion, in particular, are recognised as an area of international importance for bottlenose dolphins, and New Quay has the only summer residence of bottlenose dolphins in the whole of the UK. Freshwater fish of note include char, eel, salmon, shad, sparling and Arctic char, while the gwyniad is unique to Wales, found only in Llyn Tegid (Bala Lake). Wales is known for its shellfish, including cockles, limpet, mussels and periwinkles. Herring, mackerel and hake are the more common of the country's marine fish. The north facing high grounds of Snowdonia support a relict pre-glacial flora including the iconic Snowdon lily – Gagea serotina – and other alpine species such as Saxifraga cespitosa, Saxifraga oppositifolia and Silene acaulis. Wales has a number of plant species not found elsewhere in the UK, including the spotted rock-rose Tuberaria guttata on Anglesey and Draba aizoides on the Gower.

== Government and politics ==
Charles III
Monarch
since 2022

Rhun ap Iorwerth
First Minister
since 2026

Wales is a country that is part of the sovereign state of the United Kingdom. ISO 3166-2:GB formerly defined Wales as a principality, with England and Scotland defined as countries and Northern Ireland as a province. However, this definition was raised in the Welsh Assembly in 2010 and the then Counsel General for Wales, John Griffiths, stated, 'Principality is a misnomer and that Wales should properly be referred to as a country.' In 2011, ISO 3166-2:GB was updated and the term 'principality' was replaced with 'country'. UK Government toponymic guidelines state that, 'though there is a Prince of Wales, this role is deemed to be titular rather than exerting executive authority, and therefore Wales is described as a country rather than a principality.'

In the House of Commons – the 650-member lower house of the UK Parliament – there are 32 members of Parliament (MPs) who represent Welsh constituencies. At the 2024 general election, 27 Labour and Labour Co-op MPs were elected, along with 4 Plaid Cymru MPs and 1 Liberal Democrat MP from Wales. The Wales Office is a department of the UK government responsible for Wales, whose minister, the Secretary of State for Wales (Welsh secretary), sits in the UK cabinet.

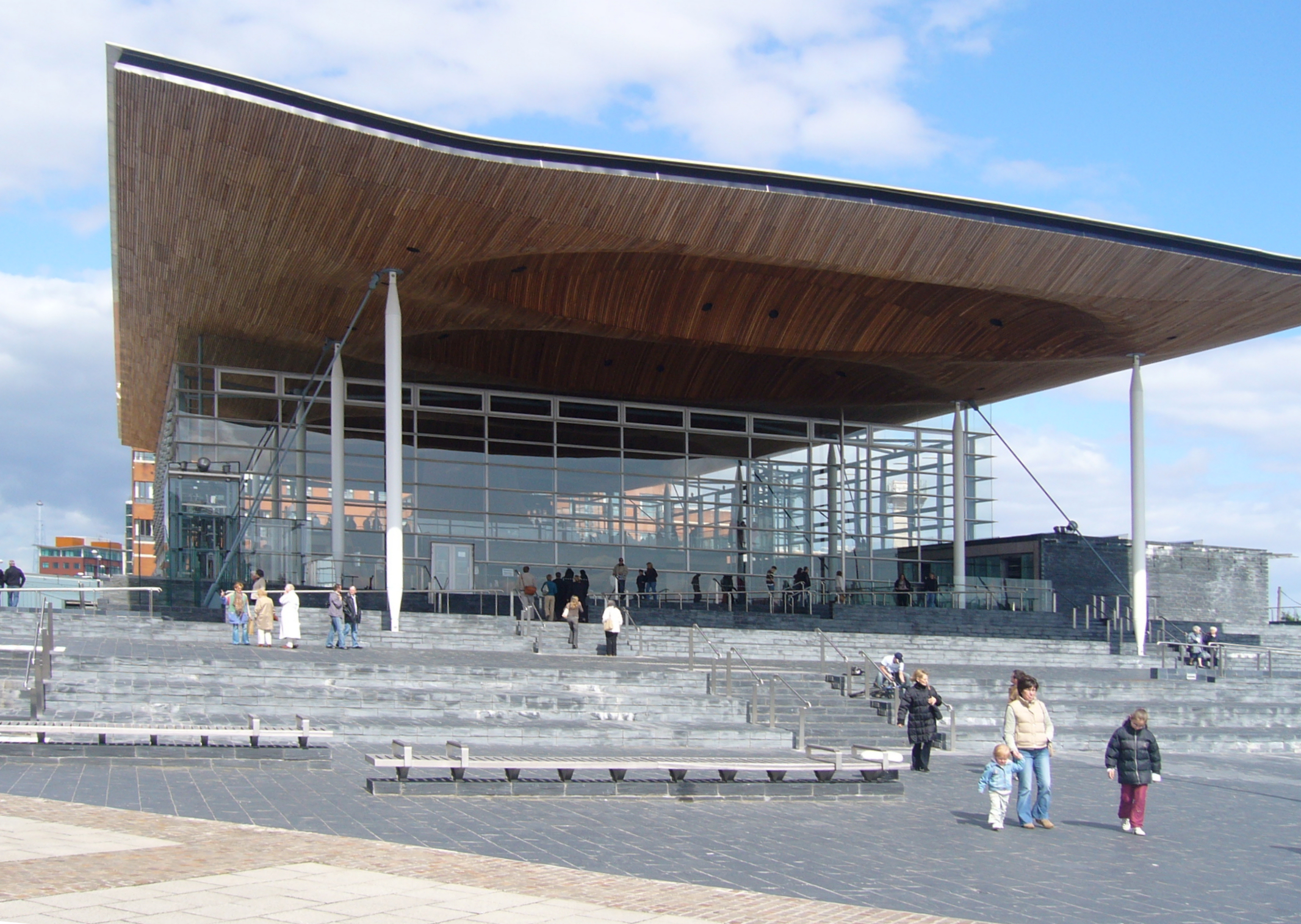
The Senedd building, designed by Richard Rogers, opened on St David's Day 2006.

Wales has a devolved, unicameral legislature known as the Senedd (Senedd Cymru – Welsh Parliament) which holds devolved powers from the UK Parliament via a reserved powers model. The current Welsh government is a Plaid Cymru minority government, with Rhun ap Iorwerth as the First Minister. Out of 96 Senedd members, Plaid Cymru have 43 members, and the opposition is led by Reform UK with 34 members, along with 9 Labour MSs, 7 Conservatives MSs, 2 Green Party MSs, and 1 Liberal Democrats MS.

For the purposes of local government, Wales has been divided into 22 council areas since 1996. These "principal areas" are responsible for the provision of all local government services.

=== Devolved government ===
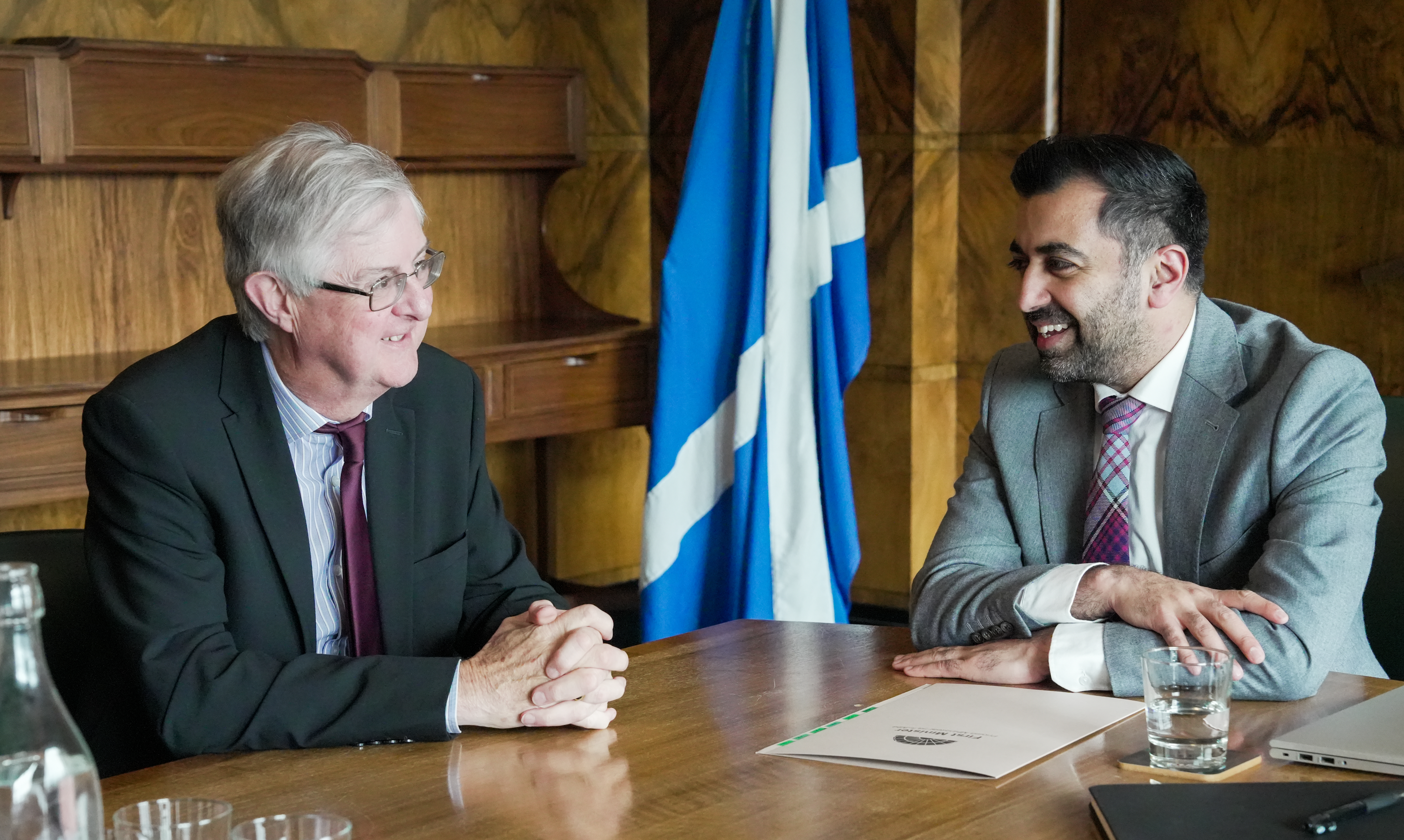
First Minister Mark Drakeford meets with First Minister of Scotland Humza Yousaf in Edinburgh, 2023

Following devolution in 1997, the Government of Wales Act 1998 created a Welsh devolved assembly, the National Assembly for Wales, with the power to determine how Wales's central government budget is spent and administered. Eight years later, the Government of Wales Act 2006 reformed the National Assembly for Wales and allowed further powers to be granted to it more easily. The Act also created a system of government with a separate executive, the Welsh Government, drawn from and accountable to the legislature, the National Assembly. Following a successful referendum in 2011, the National Assembly was empowered to make laws, known as Acts of the Assembly, on all matters in devolved subject areas, without requiring the UK Parliament's approval of legislative competence. It also gained powers to raise taxes. In May 2020, the National Assembly was renamed "Senedd Cymru" or "the Welsh Parliament", commonly known as the Senedd in both English and Welsh.

Devolved areas of responsibility include agriculture, economic development, education, health, housing, local government, social services, tourism, transport and the Welsh language. The Welsh Government also promotes Welsh interests abroad.

=== Law ===
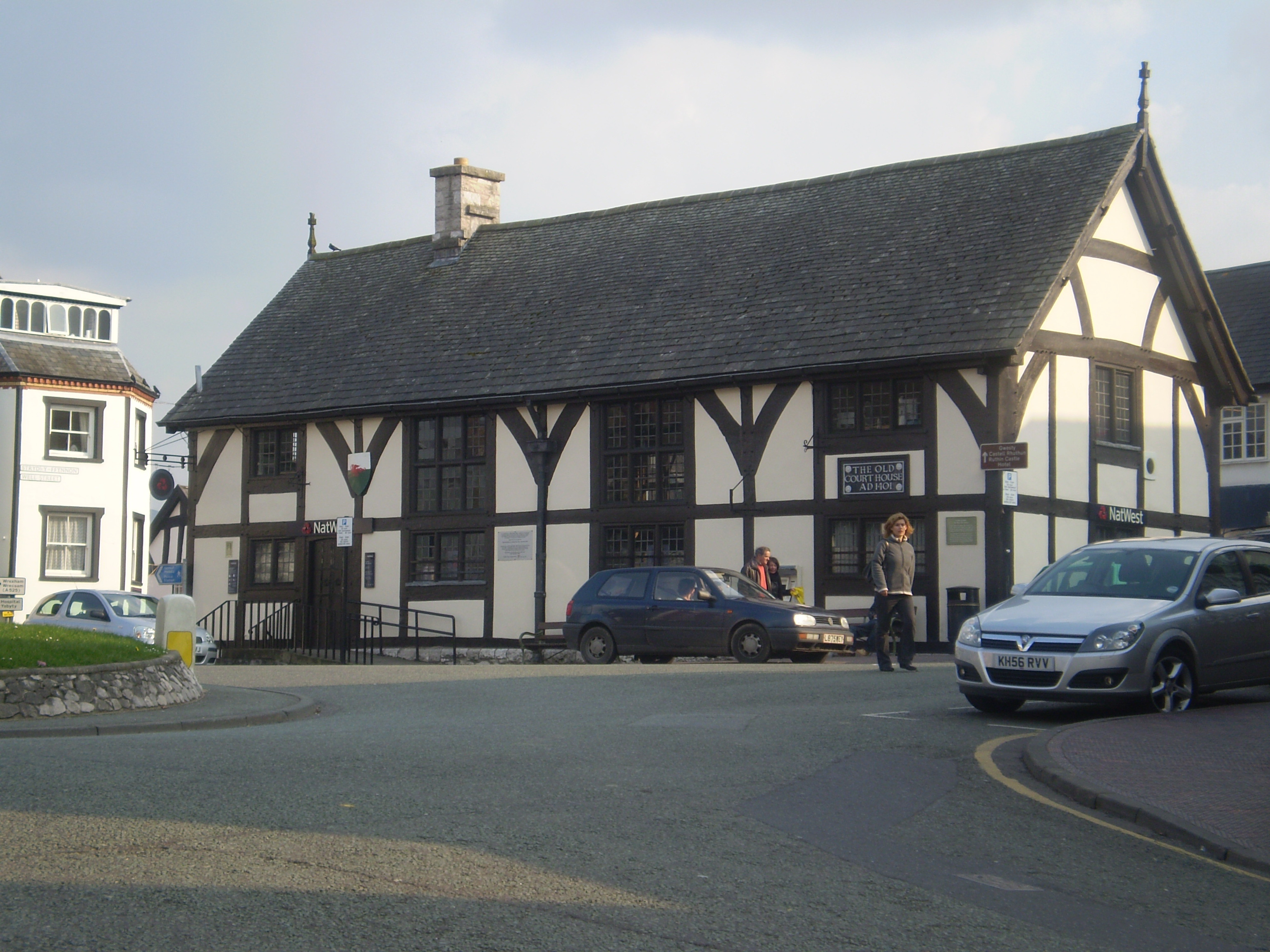
The Old Court House, Ruthin, Denbighshire, built 1401, following Owain Glyndŵr's attack on the town

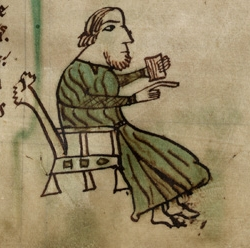
Illustration of a Welsh judge from the Laws of Hywel Dda

By tradition, Welsh Law was compiled during an assembly held at Whitland around 930 by Hywel Dda (Hywel the Good), king of most of Wales between 942 and his death in 950. Cyfraith Hywel (Welsh for 'law of Hywel Dda') codified the previously existing folk laws and legal customs that had evolved in Wales over centuries. Welsh Law emphasised the payment of compensation for a crime to the victim, or the victim's kin, rather than punishment by the ruler. Other than in the Marches, where March law was imposed by the Marcher Lords, Welsh Law remained in force only for civil cases after the Statute of Rhuddlan in 1284. Edward I of England annexed the Principality of Wales following the death of Llywelyn ap Gruffudd, and Welsh Law was replaced for criminal cases under the Statute. Marcher Law and Welsh Law remained in force until Henry VIII of England annexed the whole of Wales under the Laws in Wales Acts 1535 and 1542 (often referred to as the Acts of Union of 1536 and 1543), after which English law applied to the whole of Wales. The Wales and Berwick Act 1746 provided that all laws that applied to England would automatically apply to Wales (and the Anglo-Scottish border town of Berwick) unless the law explicitly stated otherwise; this Act was repealed with regard to Wales by the Welsh Language Act 1967. English law has been the legal system of England and Wales since 1536.

English law is regarded as a common law system, with no major codification of the law and legal precedents are binding as opposed to persuasive. The court system is headed by the Supreme Court of the United Kingdom which is the highest court of appeal in the land for criminal and civil cases. The Senior Courts of England and Wales is the highest court of first instance as well as an appellate court. The three divisions are the Court of Appeal, the High Court of Justice, and the Crown Court. Minor cases are heard by magistrates' courts or the County Court. In 2007 the Wales and Cheshire Region (known as the Wales and Cheshire Circuit before 2005) came to an end when Cheshire was attached to the North-Western England Region. From that point, Wales became a legal unit in its own right, although it remains part of the single jurisdiction of England and Wales.

The Senedd has the authority to draft and approve laws outside of the UK Parliamentary system to meet the specific needs of Wales. Under powers approved by a referendum held in March 2011, it is empowered to pass primary legislation, at the time referred to as an act of the National Assembly for Wales but now known as an act of Senedd Cymru in relation to twenty subjects listed in the Government of Wales Act 2006 such as health and education. Through this primary legislation, the Welsh Government can then also enact more specific subordinate legislation. There have however been some actions by the UK Government which has undermined devolved powers of the Welsh Government such as with the United Kingdom Internal Market Act 2020 and Pride in Place scheme 2025.

Wales is served by four regional police forces: Dyfed-Powys Police, Gwent Police, North Wales Police, and South Wales Police. There are five prisons in Wales: four in the southern half of the country, and one in Wrexham. Wales has no women's prisons: female inmates are imprisoned in England.

== Economy ==
A profile of the economy of Wales in 2012

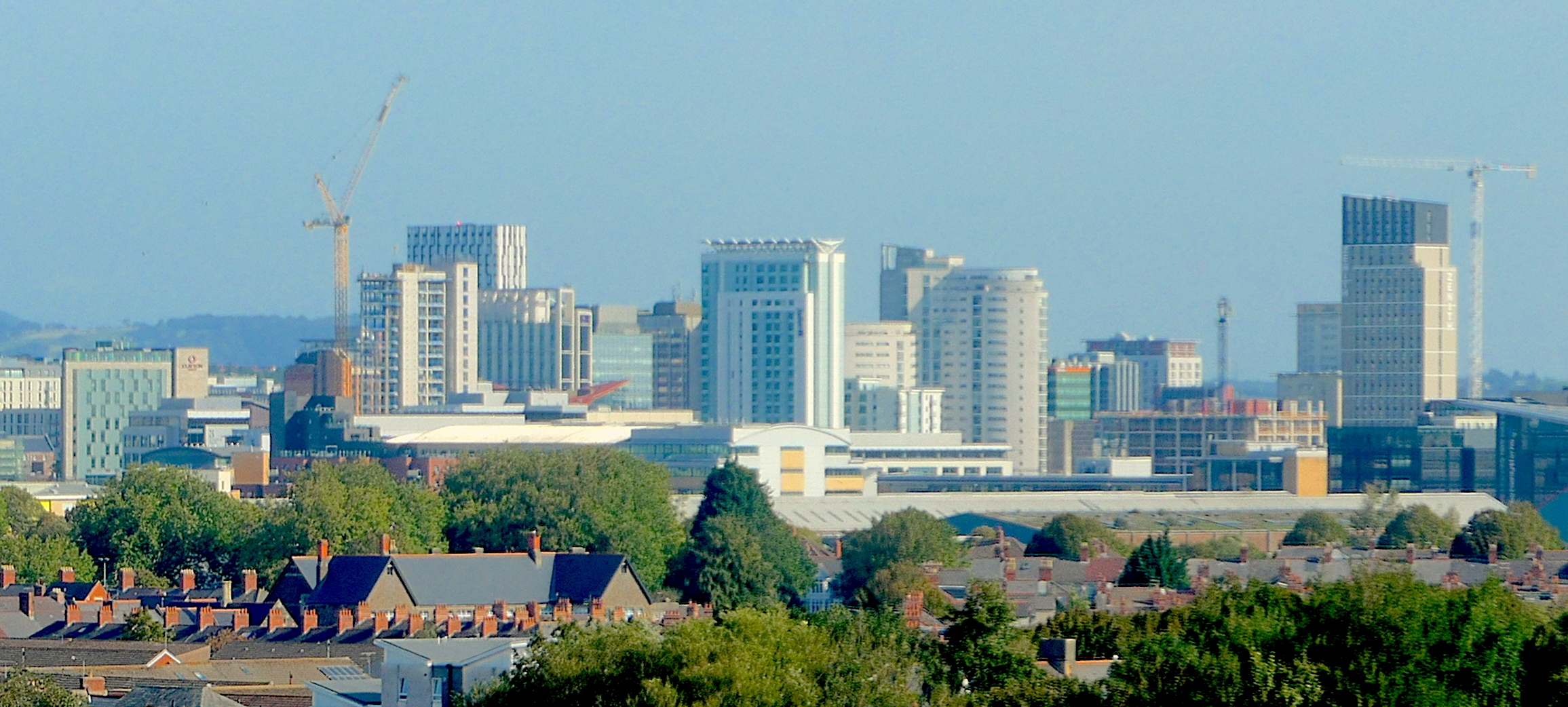
Cardiff skyline in 2020

A 2021 introduction to some of the largest companies based in Wales, including: Airbus, bipsync, HCI Pharmaceutical, ReNeuron, Deloitte, Coaltown Coffee, DMM International and Freudenberg

Over the last 250 years, Wales has been transformed from an agricultural country to an industrial, and then to a post-industrial economy. In the 1950s, Wales's GDP was twice as big as Ireland's; by the 2020s, Ireland's economy was four times that of Wales. Since the Second World War, the service sector has come to account for the majority of jobs, a feature typifying most advanced economies. in 2018, according to OECD and Eurostat data, gross domestic product (GDP) in Wales was £75 billion, an increase of 3.3 per cent from 2017. GDP per head in Wales in 2018 was £23,866, an increase of 2.9 per cent on 2017. This compares to Italy's GDP/capita of £25,000, Spain £22,000, Slovenia £20,000 and New Zealand £30,000. In the three months to December 2017, 72.7 per cent of working-age adults were employed, compared to 75.2 per cent across the UK as a whole. For the 2018–19 fiscal year, the Welsh fiscal deficit accounts for 19.4 per cent of Wales's estimated GDP.

In 2019, Wales was a net exporter of electricity. It produced 27.9 TWh of electricity while only consuming 14.7 TWh. In 2021, the Welsh government said that more than half the country's energy needs were being met by renewable sources, 2 per cent of which was from 363 hydropower projects.

By UK law, Wales contributes to items that do not directly benefit Wales e.g. over £5 billion for HS2 "which will damage the Welsh economy by £200m pa", according to the UK and Welsh Government's transport adviser Mark Barry. Wales also pays more in military costs than most similar-sized countries e.g. Wales pays twice the amount Ireland spends on the military. The UK government spends £1.75bn per year on the military in Wales, which is almost as much as Wales spends on education every year (£1.8 billion in 2018/19) and five times as much as the total amount spent on the police in Wales (£365 million).

From the middle of the 19th century until the post-war era, the mining and export of coal was the dominant industry. At its peak of production in 1913, nearly 233,000 men and women were employed in the South Wales coalfield, mining 56 million tons of coal. Cardiff was once the largest coal-exporting port in the world and, for a few years before the First World War, handled a greater tonnage of cargo than either London or Liverpool. In the 1920s, over 40 per cent of the male Welsh population worked in heavy industry. According to Phil Williams, the Great Depression "devastated Wales", north and south, because of its "overwhelming dependence on coal and steel". From the mid-1970s, the Welsh economy faced massive restructuring with large numbers of jobs in heavy industry disappearing and being replaced eventually by new ones in light industry and in services. In the late 1970s and early 1980s, Wales was successful in attracting an above average share of foreign direct investment in the UK. Much of the new industry was essentially of a "branch (or "screwdriver") factory" type where a manufacturing plant or call centre is in Wales but the most highly-paid jobs in the company are elsewhere.

Poor-quality soil in much of Wales is unsuitable for crop-growing, so livestock farming has been the focus of farming. About 78 per cent of the land surface is used for agriculture. The Welsh landscape, with its three national parks and Blue Flag beaches, attracts large numbers of tourists, who bolster the economy of rural areas. Wales, like Northern Ireland, has relatively few high value-added employment in sectors such as finance and research and development, attributable in part to a comparative lack of "economic mass" (i.e. population) – Wales lacks a large metropolitan centre. The lack of high value-added employment is reflected in lower economic output per head relative to other regions of the UK: in 2002 it stood at 90 per cent of the EU25 average and around 80 per cent of the UK average. In June 2008, Wales made history by becoming the first nation to be awarded Fairtrade status.

The pound sterling is the currency used in Wales. Numerous Welsh banks issued their own banknotes in the 19th century: the last bank to do so closed in 1908. Since then the Bank of England has had a monopoly on the issue of banknotes in Wales. The Commercial Bank of Wales, established in Cardiff by Sir Julian Hodge in 1971, was taken over by the Bank of Scotland in 1988 and absorbed into its parent company in 2002. The Royal Mint, which issues the coinage circulating through the whole of the UK, has been based at a single site in Llantrisant since 1980. Since decimalisation, in 1971, at least one of the coins in circulation emphasises Wales such as the 1995 and 2000 one pound coin. As at 2012, the last designs devoted to Wales saw production in 2008.

=== Transport ===
==== Main roads ====
- The M4 motorway running from West London to South Wales links Newport, Cardiff and Swansea. Responsibility for the section of the motorway within Wales, from the Second Severn Crossing to Pont Abraham services, sits with the Welsh Government.
- The A55 expressway has a similar role along the North Wales coast, connecting Holyhead and Bangor with Wrexham and Flintshire. It also links to northwest England, principally Chester.
- The main north-south Wales link is the A470, which runs from Cardiff to Llandudno.

==== Rail ====
Rail network of Wales, 2021

Rail transport in Wales includes the Wales & Borders franchise, which is overseen by the Welsh Government with most passenger services operated by Transport for Wales Rail. The Cardiff region has its own urban rail network. Beeching cuts in the 1960s mean that most of the remaining network is geared toward east–west travel connecting with the Irish Sea ports for ferries to Ireland. Services between north and south Wales operate through the English cities of Chester and Hereford and towns of Shrewsbury, Gobowen for Oswestry and along the Welsh Marches Line, with trains on the Heart of Wales Line from Swansea to Llandovery, Llandrindod and Knighton, connecting with the Welsh Marches line at Craven Arms. Trains in Wales are mainly diesel-powered but the South Wales Main Line branch of the Great Western Main Line used by services from London Paddington to Cardiff has undergone electrification, although the programme experienced significant delays and cost overruns. Many of the Valley Lines are also undergoing electrification, under the South Wales Metro project. A North-South railway has been suggested to better link North and South Wales.

==== Air and ferries ====
Cardiff Airport is the international airport of Wales. Providing links to European, African and Asian destinations, it is about 12 miles (19 km) southwest of Cardiff city centre, in the Vale of Glamorgan. Intra-Wales flights used to run between Anglesey (Valley) and Cardiff, and were operated since 2017 by Eastern Airways; as of 2022, those flights are no longer available. Other internal flights operate to northern England, Scotland and Northern Ireland. Wales has four commercial ferry ports. Regular ferry services to Ireland operate from Holyhead, Pembroke Dock and Fishguard. The Swansea to Cork service was cancelled in 2006, reinstated in March 2010, and withdrawn again in 2012.

== Demographics ==
=== Population history ===
Population of Wales
Year	Pop.	±%
1536	278,000	—
1620	360,000	+29.5%
1770	500,000	+38.9%
1801	587,000	+17.4%
1851	1,163,000	+98.1%
1911	2,421,000	+108.2%
1921	2,656,000	+9.7%
1939	2,487,000	−6.4%
1961	2,644,000	+6.3%
1991	2,811,865	+6.3%
2001	2,910,200	+3.5%
2011	3,063,456	+5.3%
2021	3,107,500	+1.4%
Estimated (pre-1801); census (post-1801); 2001 census 2021 census

The population of Wales doubled from 587,000 in 1801 to 1,163,000 in 1851 and had reached 2,421,000 by 1911. Most of the increase came in the coal mining districts, especially Glamorganshire, which grew from 71,000 in 1801 to 232,000 in 1851 and 1,122,000 in 1911. Part of this increase can be attributed to the demographic transition seen in most industrialising countries during the Industrial Revolution, as death rates dropped and birth rates remained steady. However, there was also large-scale immigration into Wales during the Industrial Revolution. The English were the most numerous group, but there were also considerable numbers of Irish and smaller numbers of other ethnic groups, including Italians, who migrated to South Wales. Wales also received immigration from various parts of the British Commonwealth of Nations in the 20th century, and African-Caribbean and Asian communities add to the ethnocultural mix, particularly in urban Wales. Many of these now self-identify as Welsh, and distinctions between 19th and 20th century immigrants are not viewed as significant.

The population in 1972 stood at 2.74 million and remained broadly static for the rest of the decade. However, in the early 1980s, the population fell due to net emigration out of Wales. Since the 1980s, net migration has generally been inward, and has contributed more to population growth than natural change. The resident population of Wales in 2021 according to the census was 3,107,500 (1,586,600 female and 1,521,000 male), an increase of 1.4 per cent over 2011. A decreased change from the 5 per cent increase between 2001 and 2011. Wales accounted for 5.2 per cent of the population of England and Wales in 2021. Wales has seven cities: Cardiff, Newport, Swansea, Wrexham, Bangor, St Asaph and St Davids. (The last two of these have city status in the United Kingdom despite their small populations.) Wrexham, north Wales's largest settlement, became Wales's newest and seventh city in September 2022.

Largest cities or towns in Wales Office for National Statistics 2011 Census
Rank	Name	Council area	Pop.	Rank	Name	Council area	Pop.
1	Cardiff	City & County of Cardiff	335,145	11	Caerphilly	Caerphilly County Borough	41,402
2	Swansea	City & County of Swansea	239,000	12	Port Talbot	Neath Port Talbot	37,276
3	Newport	Newport City	128,060	13	Pontypridd	Rhondda Cynon Taf	30,457
4	Wrexham	Wrexham County Borough	61,603	14	Aberdare	Rhondda Cynon Taf	29,748
5	Barry	Vale of Glamorgan	54,673	15	Colwyn Bay	Conwy County Borough	29,405
6	Neath	Neath Port Talbot	50,658	16	Pontypool	Torfaen	28,334
7	Cwmbran	Torfaen	46,915	17	Penarth	Vale of Glamorgan	27,226
8	Bridgend	Bridgend County Borough	46,757	18	Rhyl	Denbighshire	25,149
9	Llanelli	Carmarthenshire	43,878	19	Blackwood	Caerphilly County Borough	24,042
10	Merthyr Tydfil	Merthyr Tydfil	43,820	20	Maesteg	Bridgend County Borough	18,888

=== Ethnicity ===
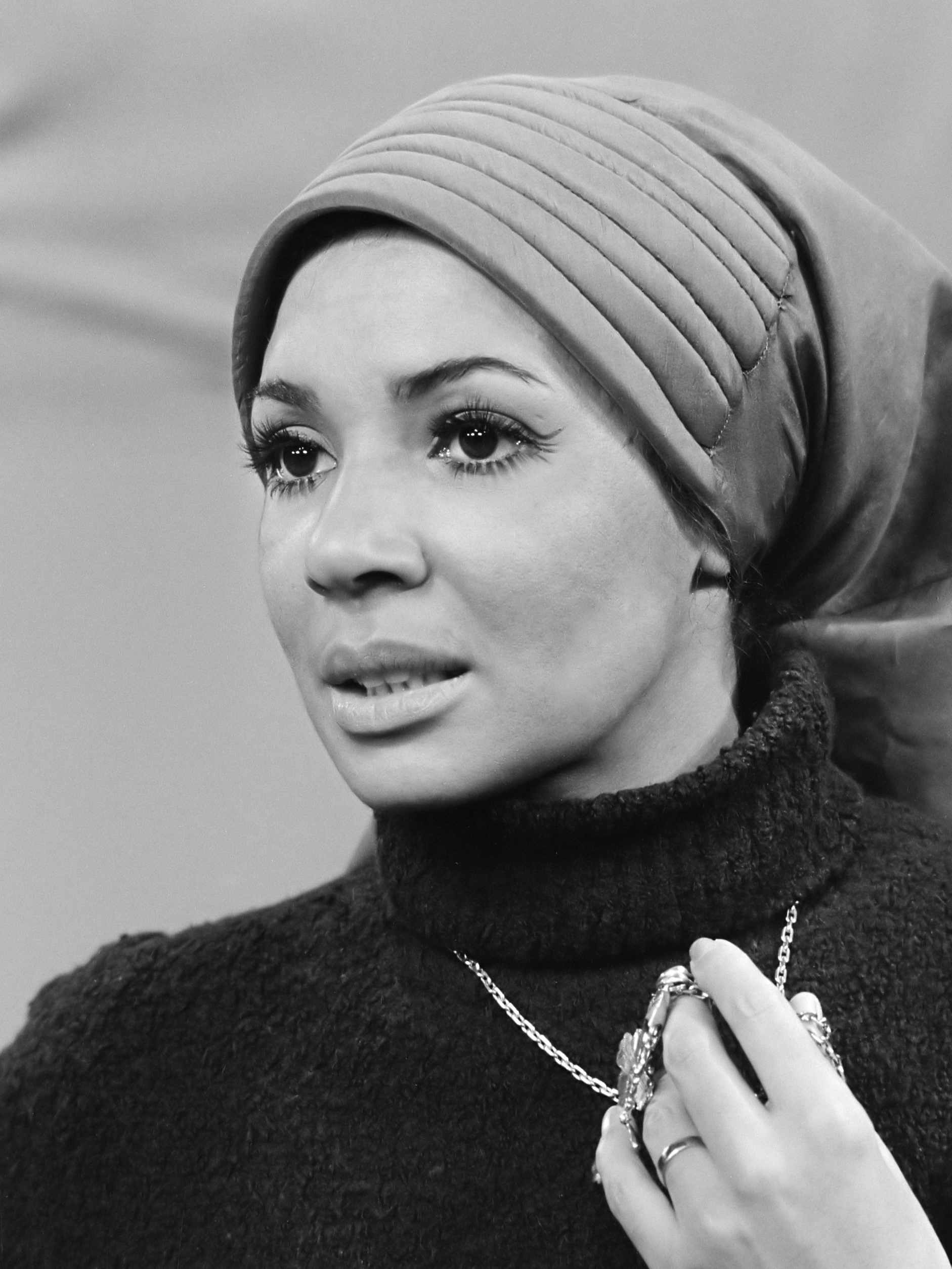
Singer Shirley Bassey

The 2021 census showed that 93.8 per cent of the population of Wales identified as "White", compared to 95.6 per cent in 2011. 90.6 per cent of the population identified as "White: Welsh, English, Scottish, Northern Irish or British" in 2021. The second-highest ethnicity in 2021 was "Asian, Asian Welsh or Asian British" at 2.9 per cent of the population, compared to 2.3 per cent in 2011. 1.6 per cent of the population identified as "Mixed or multiple ethnic groups", compared to 1.0 per cent in 2011; 0.9 per cent of the population identified as "Black, Black Welsh, Black British, Caribbean or African", compared to 0.6 per cent in 2011; and 0.9 per cent identified as "Other ethnic group" compared to 0.5 per cent in 2011. The local authorities with the highest proportions of "high-level" ethnic groups other than "White" were mainly urban areas including Cardiff, Newport and Swansea. 5.3 per cent of households in Wales were multiple ethnic group households, up from 4.2 per cent in 2011.

In 2021, the first statue of a named, non-fictional woman outdoors was raised for Wales's first black headteacher, Betty Campbell. In 2023, Patti Flynn (a contemporary of Shirley Bassey, both of Tiger Bay, Cardiff) became the first black Welsh woman to be awarded a purple plaque.

In 2024, Vaughan Gething was elected First Minister of Wales becoming the first black head of government in Europe; he had previously served as Secretary for Finance.

=== National identity ===
The 2021 census showed that only 55.2 per cent identified as "Welsh only" down from 57.5% in 2011, and 8.1 per cent identified as "Welsh and British" up from 7.1%, giving the combined proportion of only 63.3 per cent (down from 64.4) of people identifying as Welsh. 18.5% identified as "British only", and 9.1% identified as "English only", meaning 18.2% of people living in Wales identified with another nationality, with 5.4% being a non-UK identity, the largest being Polish at 0.7% overall.

There is a geographical distribution of identities, with the highest amount of "Welsh only" identities being in the South Wales Valleys and West Wales, with Merthyr Tydfil county recording the single highest rate of 70%. Meanwhile English and British identity is highest among areas near the English border and coastal communities, with Flintshire recording the lowest amount of "Welsh only" identities at 34.7%. Urban areas are also more diverse with Cardiff recording the most number of different national identities.

The Welsh Annual Population Survey showed that the proportion of people who identified as Welsh versus another identity was 62.3 per cent in 2022, compared to 69.2 per cent in 2001. A 2022 YouGov poll found that 21 per cent considered themselves Welsh not British, 15 per cent more Welsh than British, 24 per cent equally Welsh and British, 7 per cent more British than Welsh, 20 per cent British and not Welsh, and 8 per cent other; a total of 67 per cent thus considered themselves Welsh to some degree.

=== Language ===
The proportion of respondents in the 2011 census who said they could speak Welsh

Welsh is an official language in Wales as legislated by the Welsh Language (Wales) Measure 2011. Both Welsh and English are also official languages of the Senedd. The proportion of the Welsh population able to speak the Welsh language fell from just under 50 per cent in 1901 to 43.5 per cent in 1911, and continued to fall to 18.9 per cent in 1981. The results of the 2001 Census showed an increase in the number of Welsh speakers to 21 per cent of the population aged 3 and older, compared with 18.7 per cent in 1991 and 19 per cent in 1981. This compares with a pattern of steady decline indicated by census results during the 20th century. In the 2011 census it was recorded that the proportion of people able to speak Welsh had dropped from 20.8 per cent to 19 per cent (still higher than 1991). Despite an increase in the overall size of the Welsh population this still meant that the number of Welsh speakers in Wales dropped from 582,000 in 2001 to 562,000 in 2011. However, this figure was still higher than the 508,000 people (or 18.7 per cent of the population) who said they could speak Welsh in the 1991 census.

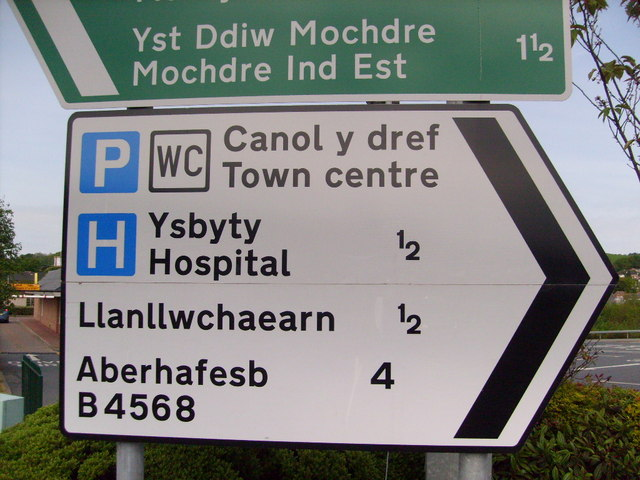
Bilingual road sign in Welsh and English

According to the 2021 census, the Welsh-speaking population of Wales aged three or older was 17.8 per cent (538,300 people) and nearly three-quarters of the population in Wales said they had no Welsh language skills. Other estimates suggest that 29.7 per cent (899,500) of people aged three or older in Wales could speak Welsh in June 2022.

English is spoken by almost all people in Wales and is the main language in most of the country. Code-switching is common in all parts of Wales and is known by various terms, though none is recognised by professional linguists. "Wenglish" is the Welsh dialect of the English language. It has been influenced significantly by Welsh grammar and includes words derived from Welsh. Northern and western Wales retain many areas where Welsh is spoken as a first language by the majority of the population, and English learnt as a second language. Although monoglotism in young children continues, life-long monoglotism in Welsh no longer occurs.

It is unknown when the last monoglot Welsh adult died, and there are still some remote people who have very little English ability, but a newspaper from Y Rhiw, Pen Llŷn, recorded that a Mrs Jane Jones was monoglot Welsh and died at 100 years old in 1980.

Since Poland joined the European Union, Wales has seen a significant increase in Polish immigrants. This has made Polish the most common main language in Wales after English and Welsh, at 0.7 per cent of the population.

=== Religion ===
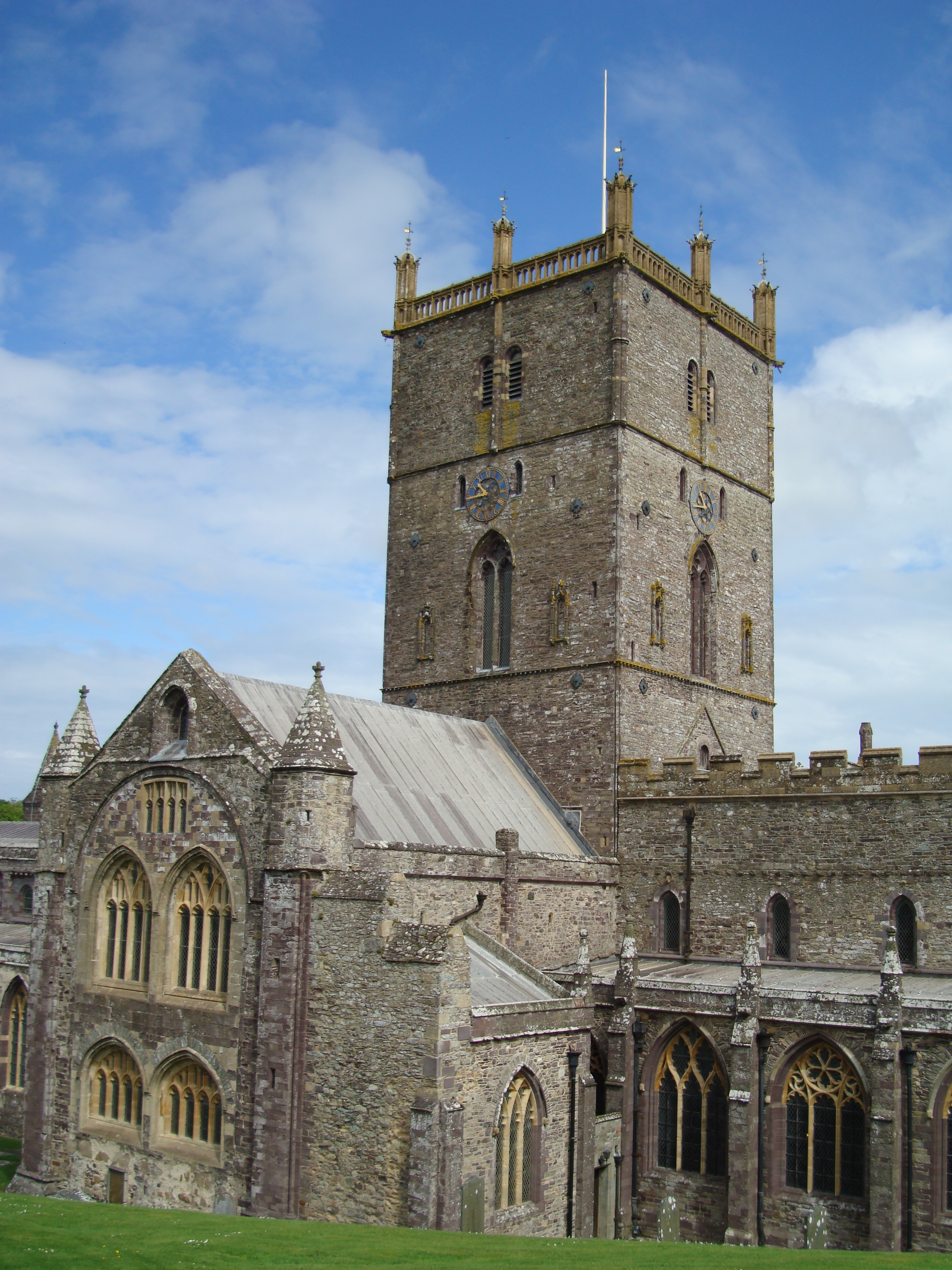
St. David's Cathedral, Pembrokeshire

Forms of Christianity have dominated religious life in what is now Wales for more than 1,400 years. The 2021 census recorded that 46.5 per cent had "No religion", more than any single religious affiliation and up from 32.1 per cent in 2011. The largest religion in Wales is Christianity, with 43.6 per cent of the population describing themselves as Christian in the 2021 census. The patron saint of Wales is Saint David (Dewi Sant), with Saint David's Day (Dydd Gŵyl Dewi Sant) celebrated annually on 1 March. The early 20th century saw a religious revival, the 1904–1905 Welsh Revival, which started through the evangelism of Evan Roberts and brought large numbers of converts, sometimes whole communities, to non-Anglican Christianity.

The Church in Wales with 56,000 adherents has the largest attendance of the denominations. It is a province of the Anglican Communion, and was part of the Church of England until disestablishment in 1920 under the Welsh Church Act 1914. The first Independent Church in Wales was founded at Llanvaches in 1638 by William Wroth. The Presbyterian Church of Wales was born out of the Welsh Methodist revival in the 18th century and seceded from the Church of England in 1811. The second largest attending faith in Wales is Roman Catholic, with an estimated 43,000 adherents.

Non-Christian religions are small in Wales, making up approximately 2.7 per cent of the population. Islam is the largest, with 24,000 (0.8 per cent) reported Muslims in the 2011 census. There are also communities of Hindus and Sikhs, mainly in the south Wales cities of Newport, Cardiff and Swansea, while the largest concentration of Buddhists is in the western rural county of Ceredigion. Judaism was the first non-Christian faith to be established in Wales since Roman times, though by 2001 the community had declined to approximately 2,000 and as of 2019 only numbers in the hundreds.

=== Education ===
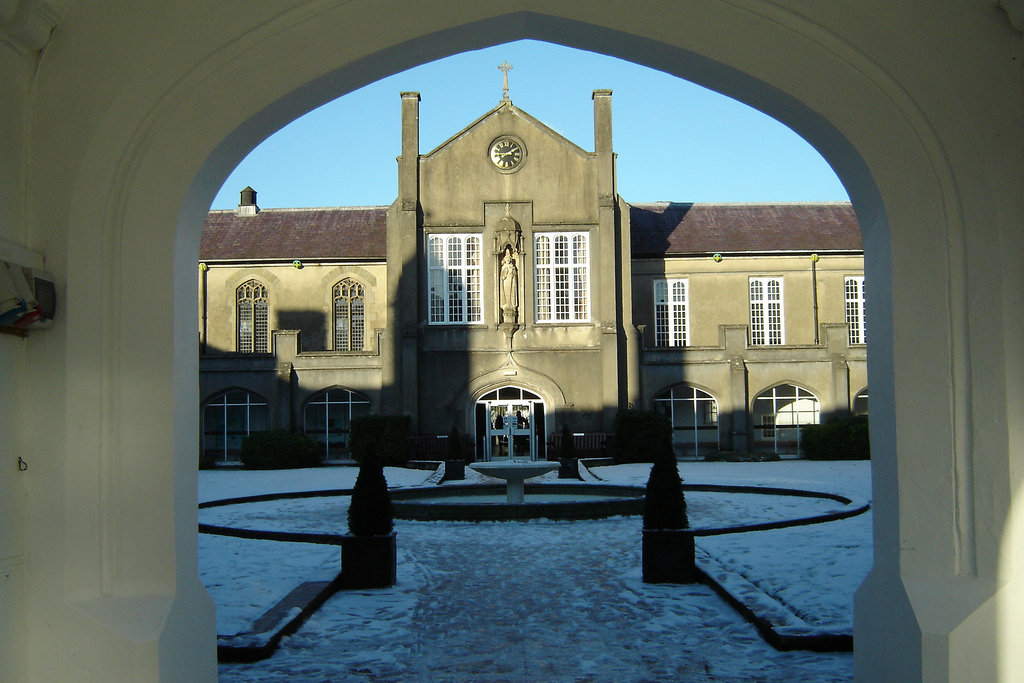
St. David's Building, Lampeter campus, University of Wales, Trinity Saint David (Prifysgol Cymru, Y Drindod Dewi Sant). Founded in 1822, it is the oldest degree-awarding institution in Wales.

A distinct education system has developed in Wales. Formal education before the 18th century was the preserve of the elite. The first grammar schools were established in Welsh towns such as Ruthin, Brecon and Cowbridge. One of the first successful schooling systems was started by Griffith Jones, who introduced the circulating schools in the 1730s; these are believed to have taught half the country's population to read. In the early 19th century, English became the usual language of instruction at schools in Wales. While the country's working class was largely Welsh-speaking at the time, Welsh public opinion wished for children to learn English. Many schools used corporal punishment to stop children from speaking Welsh in the first half of the 19th century; the practice declined in the second half of the century. The British government never prohibited the use of Welsh at schools but it treated English as the assumed language of instruction. More Welsh was gradually used at schools in Welsh-speaking areas in the mid to late 19th century and teaching of the language began to receive moderate government support from the late 19th century.

The University College of Wales opened in Aberystwyth in 1872. Cardiff and Bangor followed, and the three colleges came together in 1893 to form the University of Wales. The Welsh Intermediate Education Act 1889 created 95 secondary schools. The Welsh Department for the Board of Education followed in 1907, which gave Wales its first significant educational devolution. A resurgence in Welsh-language schools in the latter half of the 20th century at nursery and primary level saw attitudes shift towards teaching in the medium of Welsh. Welsh is a compulsory subject in all of Wales's state schools for pupils aged 5–16 years old. While there has never been an exclusively Welsh-language college, Welsh-medium higher education is delivered through the individual universities and has since 2011 been supported by the Coleg Cymraeg Cenedlaethol (Welsh-language National College) as a delocalised federal institution. In 2021–2022, there were 1,470 maintained schools in Wales. In 2021–22, the country had 471,131 pupils taught by 25,210 full-time equivalent teachers.

=== Health ===
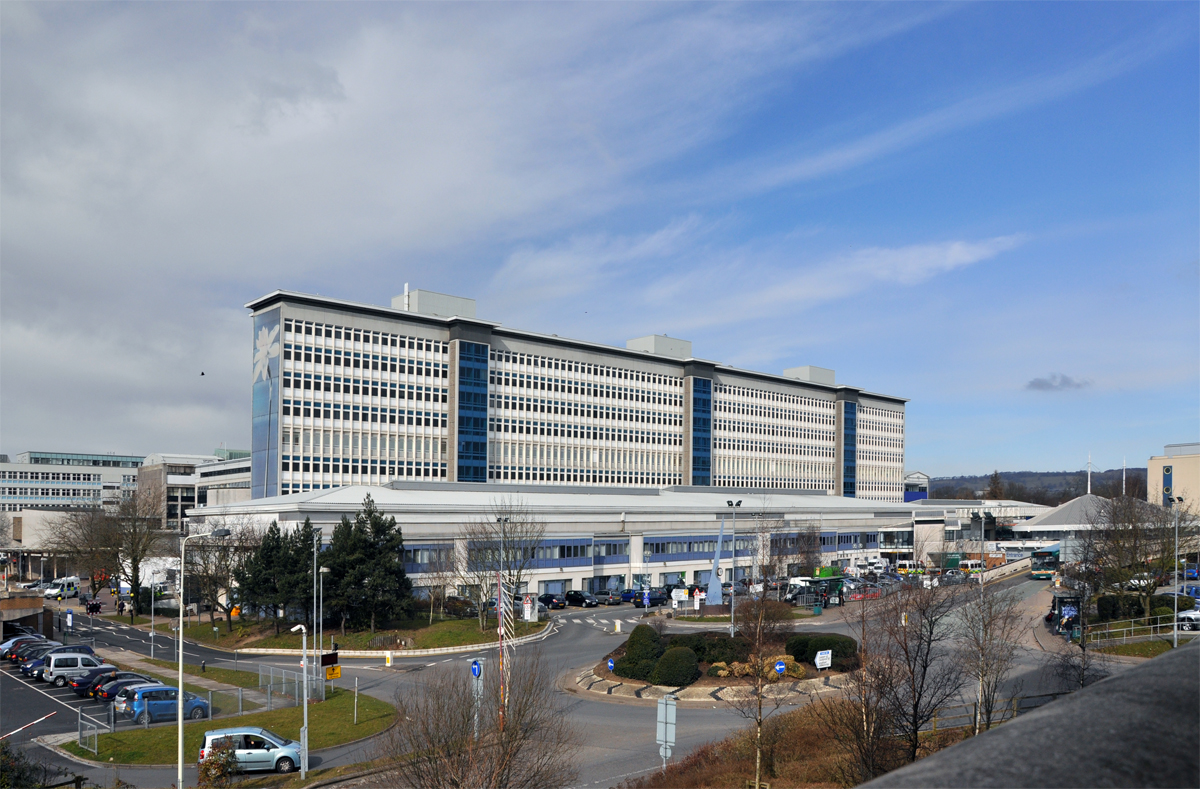
University Hospital of Wales, Cardiff

Public healthcare in Wales is provided by NHS Wales (GIG Cymru), through seven local health boards and three all-Wales trusts. It was originally formed as part of the NHS structure for England and Wales by the National Health Service Act 1946, but with powers over the NHS in Wales coming under the Secretary of State for Wales in 1969. Responsibility for NHS Wales passed to the Welsh Assembly under devolution in 1999, and is now the responsibility of the Minister for Health and Social Services. Historically, Wales was served by smaller 'cottage' hospitals, built as voluntary institutions. As newer, more expensive, diagnostic techniques and treatments became available, clinical work has been concentrated in newer, larger district hospitals. In 2006, there were seventeen district hospitals in Wales. NHS Wales directly employs over 90,000 staff, making it Wales's biggest employer. The National Survey for Wales in 2021–22 reported that 72 per cent of adults surveyed had good or very good general health, 19 per cent had fair general health and 8 had bad or very bad general health. The survey recorded that 46 per cent of Welsh adults had a long-standing illness, such as arthritis, asthma, diabetes or heart disease. The survey also reported that 13 per cent of the adult population were smokers, 16 per cent admitted drinking alcohol above weekly recommended guidelines, while 56 per cent undertook the recommended 150 minutes of physical activity each week. According to the survey, 30 per cent of adults in Wales reported to have eaten at least 5 portions of fruit or vegetables the previous day and 36 per cent reported a healthy weight.

== Culture ==
Wales has a distinctive culture including its own language, customs, holidays and music. There are four UNESCO World Heritage Sites in Wales: The Castles and Town Walls of King Edward I in Gwynedd; Pontcysyllte Aqueduct and Canal; the Blaenavon Industrial Landscape; and The Slate Landscape of Northwest Wales.

=== Museums and libraries ===
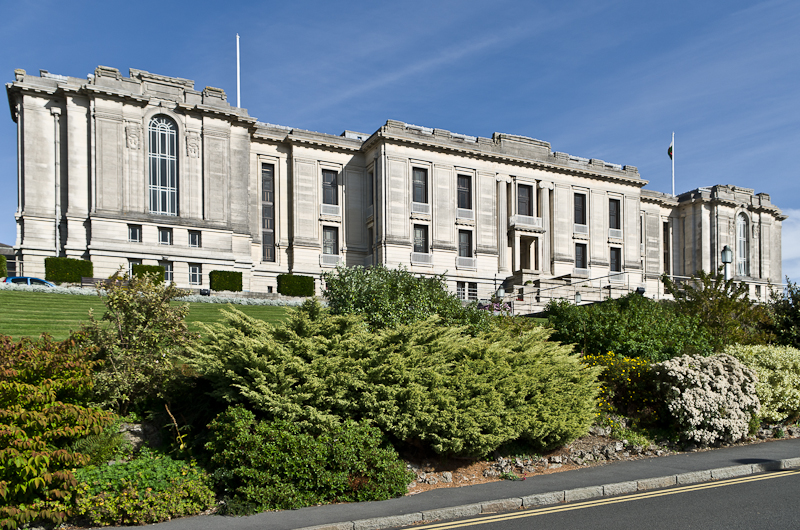
The National Library of Wales, Aberystwyth

Amgueddfa Cymru – Museum Wales was founded by royal charter in 1907 as the National Museum of Wales. It operates at seven sites: National Museum Cardiff, St Fagans National History Museum, Big Pit National Coal Museum, National Wool Museum, National Slate Museum, National Roman Legion Museum, and the National Waterfront Museum. Entry to all sites is free. The National Library of Wales, based in Aberystwyth, houses important collections of printed works, including the Sir John Williams Collection and the Shirburn Castle collection, as well as art collections including portraits and photographs, ephemera and Ordnance Survey maps.

=== Mythology ===
Remnants of native Celtic mythology of the pre-Christian Britons was passed down orally by the cynfeirdd (the early poets). Some of their work survives in later medieval Welsh manuscripts: the Black Book of Carmarthen and the Book of Aneirin (both 13th-century); the Book of Taliesin and the White Book of Rhydderch (both 14th-century); and the Red Book of Hergest (c. 1400). The prose stories from the White and Red Books are known as the Mabinogion. Poems such as Cad Goddeu (The Battle of the Trees) and mnemonic list-texts like the Welsh Triads and the Thirteen Treasures of the Island of Britain, also contain mythological material. These texts include the earliest forms of the Arthurian legend and the traditional history of post-Roman Britain. Other sources of Welsh folklore include the 9th-century Latin historical compilation Historia Britonum (the History of the Britons) and Geoffrey of Monmouth's 12th-century Latin chronicle Historia Regum Britanniae (the History of the Kings of Britain), and later folklore, such as The Welsh Fairy Book by W. Jenkyn Thomas.

=== Literature ===
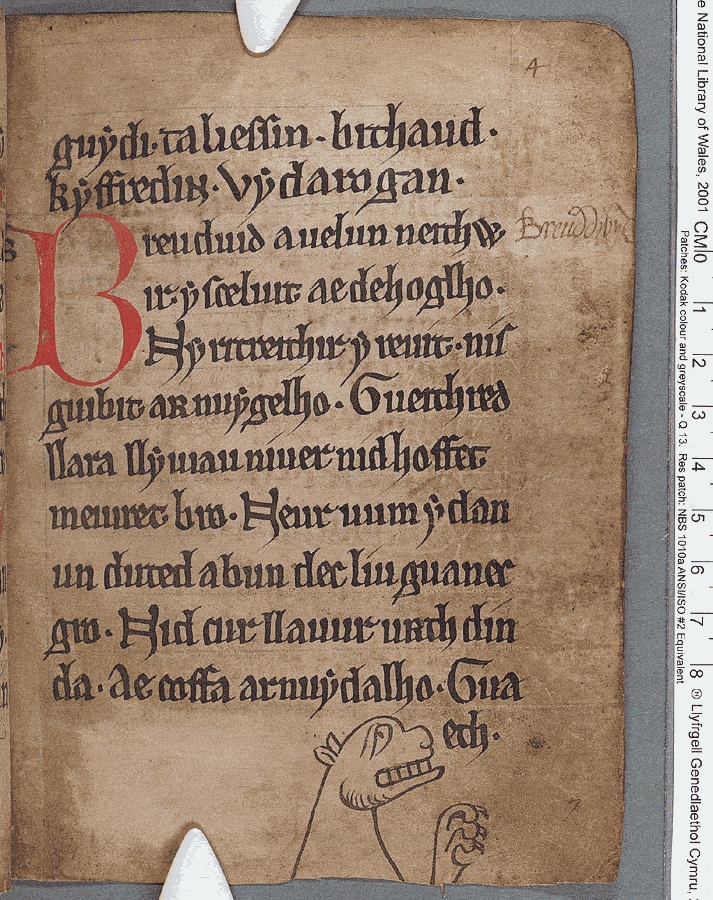
Welsh poetry from the 13th-century Black Book of Carmarthen.

Wales has one of the oldest unbroken literary traditions in Europe going back to the sixth century and including Geoffrey of Monmouth and Gerald of Wales, regarded as among the finest Latin authors of the Middle Ages. The earliest body of Welsh verse, by poets Taliesin and Aneirin, survive not in their original form, but in much-changed, medieval versions. Welsh poetry and native lore and learning survived through the era of the Poets of the Princes (c. 1100–1280) and then the Poets of the Gentry (c. 1350–1650). The former were professional poets who composed eulogies and elegies to their patrons while the latter favoured the cywydd metre. The period produced one of Wales's greatest poets, Dafydd ap Gwilym. After the Anglicisation of the gentry the tradition declined.

Despite the extinction of the professional poet, the integration of the native elite into a wider cultural world did bring other literary benefits. Renaissance scholars such as William Salesbury and John Davies brought humanist ideals from English universities. In 1588 William Morgan became the first person to translate the Bible into Welsh. From the 16th century the proliferation of the 'free-metre' verse became the most important development in Welsh poetry, but from the middle of the 17th century a host of imported accentual metres from England became very popular. By the 19th century the creation of a Welsh epic, fuelled by the eisteddfod, became an obsession with Welsh-language writers. The output of this period was prolific in quantity but unequal in quality. Initially excluded, religious denominations came to dominate the competitions, with bardic themes becoming scriptural and didactic.

Developments in 19th-century Welsh literature include Lady Charlotte Guest's translation into English of the Mabinogion, one of the most important medieval Welsh prose works of Celtic mythology. 1885 saw the publication of Rhys Lewis by Daniel Owen, credited as the first novel written in the Welsh language. The 20th century saw a move from the verbose Victorian Welsh style, with works such as Thomas Gwynn Jones's Ymadawiad Arthur. The First World War had a profound effect on Welsh literature with a more pessimistic style championed by T. H. Parry-Williams and R. Williams Parry. The industrialisation of south Wales saw a further shift with the likes of Rhydwen Williams who used the poetry and metre of a bygone rural Wales but in the context of an industrial landscape. The inter-war period is dominated by Saunders Lewis, for his political and reactionary views as much as his plays, poetry and criticism.

The careers of some 1930s writers continued after World War Two, including those of Gwyn Thomas, Vernon Watkins, and Dylan Thomas, whose most famous work Under Milk Wood was first broadcast in 1954. Thomas was one of the most notable and popular Welsh writers of the 20th century and one of the most innovative poets of his time. The attitude of the post-war generation of Welsh writers in English towards Wales differs from the previous generation, with greater sympathy for Welsh nationalism and the Welsh language. The change is linked to the nationalism of Saunders Lewis and the burning of the Bombing School on the Llŷn Peninsula in 1936. In poetry R. S. Thomas (1913–2000) was the most important figure throughout the second half of the 20th century. He "did not learn the Welsh language until he was 30 and wrote all his poems in English". Major writers in the second half of the 20th century include Emyr Humphreys (1919–2020), who during his long writing career published over twenty novels, and Raymond Williams (1921–1988).

=== Visual arts ===
Works of Celtic art have been found in Wales. In the Early Medieval period, the Celtic Christianity of Wales was part of the Insular art of the British Isles. A number of illuminated manuscripts from Wales survive, including the 8th-century Hereford Gospels and Lichfield Gospels. The 11th-century Ricemarch Psalter (now in Dublin) is certainly Welsh, made in St David's, and shows a late Insular style with unusual Viking influence.

Some Welsh artists of the 16th–18th centuries tended to leave the country to work, moving to London or Italy. Richard Wilson (1714–1782) is arguably the first major British landscapist; although more notable for his Italian scenes, he painted several Welsh scenes on visits from London. By the late 18th century, the popularity of landscape art grew and clients were found in the larger Welsh towns, allowing more Welsh artists to stay in their homeland. Artists from outside Wales were also drawn to paint Welsh scenery, at first because of the Celtic Revival.

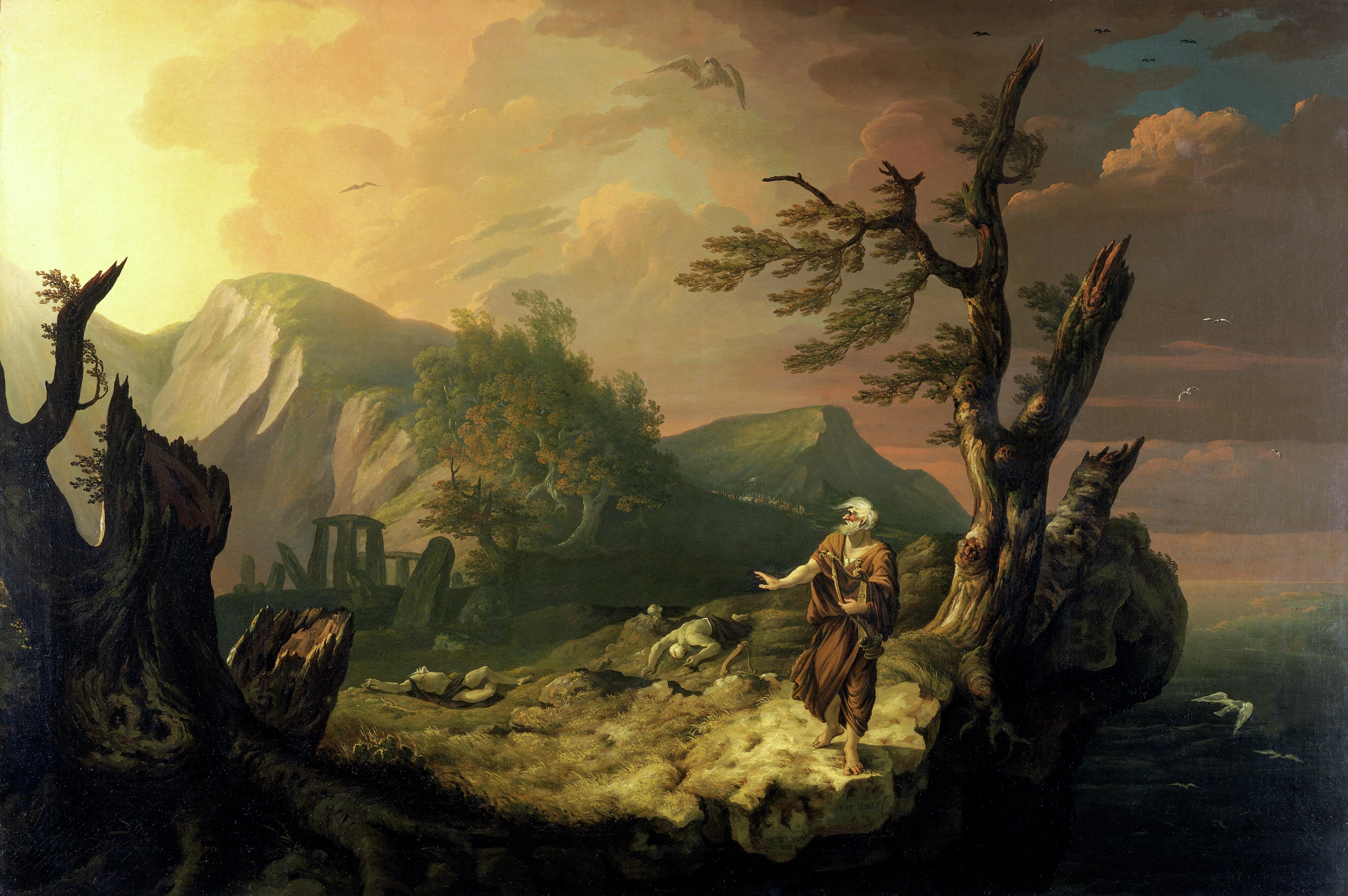
The Bard, 1774, by Thomas Jones (1742–1803).

The Industrial Schools Act 1857 provided for the establishment of a number of art schools throughout the United Kingdom, and the Cardiff School of Art opened in 1865. Graduates still very often had to leave Wales to work, but Betws-y-Coed became a popular centre for artists, and its artists' colony helped to form the Royal Cambrian Academy of Art in 1881. The sculptor Sir William Goscombe John made works for Welsh commissions, although he had settled in London. Christopher Williams, whose subjects were mostly resolutely Welsh, was also based in London. Thomas E. Stephens and Andrew Vicari had very successful careers as portraitists, based respectively in the United States and France.

Welsh painters gravitated towards the art capitals of Europe. Augustus John and his sister Gwen John lived mostly in London and Paris. However, the landscapists Sir Kyffin Williams and Peter Prendergast lived in Wales for most of their lives, while remaining in touch with the wider art world. Ceri Richards was very engaged in the Welsh art scene as a teacher in Cardiff and even after moving to London; he was a figurative painter in international styles including Surrealism. Various artists have moved to Wales, including Eric Gill, the London-Welshman David Jones, and the sculptor Jonah Jones. The Kardomah Gang was an intellectual circle in Swansea, centred on the poet Dylan Thomas and the poet and artist Vernon Watkins, which also included the painter Alfred Janes.

South Wales had several notable potteries, one of the first important sites being the Ewenny Pottery in Bridgend, which began producing earthenware in the 17th century. In the 18th and 19th centuries, with more scientific methods becoming available, more refined ceramics were produced: this was led by the Cambrian Pottery (1764–1870, also known as "Swansea pottery"), and later Nantgarw Pottery near Cardiff, which was in operation from 1813 to 1820 making fine porcelain, and then utilitarian pottery from 1833 until 1920. Portmeirion Pottery, founded in 1960 by Susan Williams-Ellis (daughter of Clough Williams-Ellis, creator of the Italianate village of Portmeirion, Gwynedd) is based in Stoke-on-Trent, England.

=== Media ===
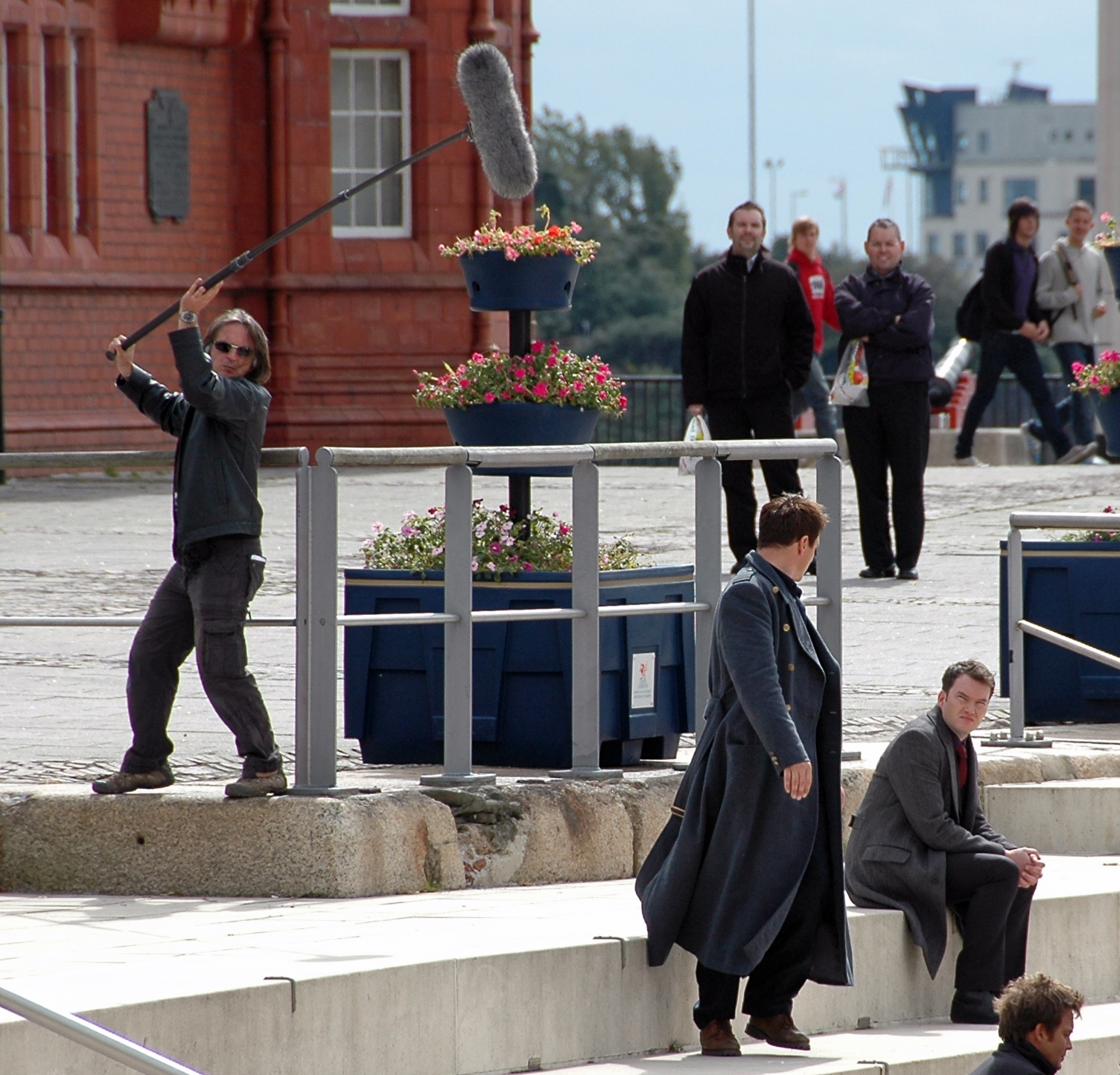
A number of BBC productions, such as Doctor Who and Torchwood, have been filmed in Wales.

Wales became the UK's first digital television nation in 2010. BBC Cymru Wales is the national broadcaster, producing both television and radio programmes in Welsh and English. It has also produced programmes such as Life on Mars, Doctor Who and Torchwood for BBC's network audience across the United Kingdom. ITV, the UK's main commercial broadcaster, has a Welsh-orientated service branded ITV Cymru Wales. S4C began broadcasting in 1982. Its output was mostly in Welsh at peak hours, but shared English-language content with Channel 4 at other times. Since the digital switchover the channel has broadcast exclusively in Welsh. BBC Radio Cymru is the BBC's Welsh-language radio service, which broadcasts throughout Wales. A number of independent radio stations broadcast in the Welsh regions, predominantly in English. In 2006, several regional radio stations broadcast in Welsh: output ranged from two two-minute news bulletins each weekday (Radio Maldwyn) to over 14 hours of Welsh-language programmes weekly (Swansea Sound) to essentially bilingual stations such as Heart Cymru and Radio Ceredigion.

Most of the newspapers sold and read in Wales are national newspapers available throughout Britain. The Western Mail is Wales's only print national daily newspaper. Wales-based regional daily newspapers include the Daily Post (which covers North Wales), the South Wales Evening Post (Swansea), the South Wales Echo (Cardiff), and the South Wales Argus (Newport). Y Cymro is a Welsh-language newspaper, published weekly. Wales on Sunday is the only Welsh Sunday newspaper that covers the whole of Wales. The Books Council of Wales is the Welsh-Government-funded body tasked with promoting Welsh literature in Welsh and English. The BCW provides publishing grants for qualifying English- and Welsh-language publications. Around 650 books are published each year, by some of the dozens of Welsh publishers. Wales's main publishing houses include Gomer Press, Gwasg Carreg Gwalch, Honno, the University of Wales Press and Y Lolfa. Journals with a Welsh focus include Cambria (a Welsh affairs magazine published bi-monthly in English), Planet, and Poetry Wales. Welsh-language magazines include the current affairs titles Golwg ("View"), published weekly, and Barn ("Opinion"), published monthly. Y Wawr ("The Dawn") is published quarterly by Merched y Wawr, the national organisation for women. Y Traethodydd ("The Essayist"), a quarterly publication by the Presbyterian Church of Wales, first appeared in 1845 and is the oldest Welsh publication still in print.

=== Performing arts ===
==== Music and festivals ====
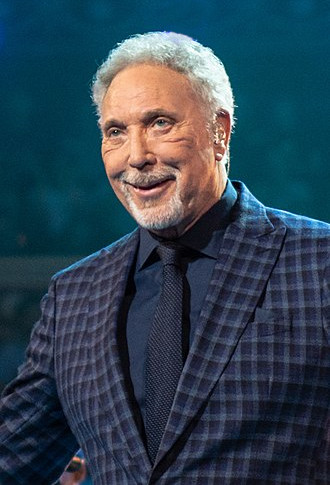
Singer Tom Jones

Wales, "the land of song", is notable for its solo artists, its male voice choirs and its harpists. The annual National Eisteddfod is the country's main performance festival. The Llangollen International Eisteddfod provides an opportunity for the singers and musicians of the world to perform. The Welsh Folk Song Society publishes collections of historical songs and tunes. Traditional instruments of Wales include the telyn deires (triple harp), fiddle, crwth (bowed lyre) and the pibgorn (hornpipe). Male voice choirs emerged in the 19th century, formed as the tenor and bass sections of chapel choirs, and embraced the popular secular hymns of the day. Welsh congregations and choirs were known for singing in a rousing four-voice style, becoming characteristic of the country. Many of the historic choirs survive in modern Wales, singing a mixture of traditional and popular songs.

The BBC National Orchestra of Wales performs in Wales and internationally. The Welsh National Opera is based at the Wales Millennium Centre in Cardiff Bay, while the National Youth Orchestra of Wales was the first of its type in the world. Wales has a tradition of producing notable singers in both the classical and pop arenas, as well as some popular bands. The Welsh folk music scene has enjoyed a resurgence in the 21st century.

==== Drama ====
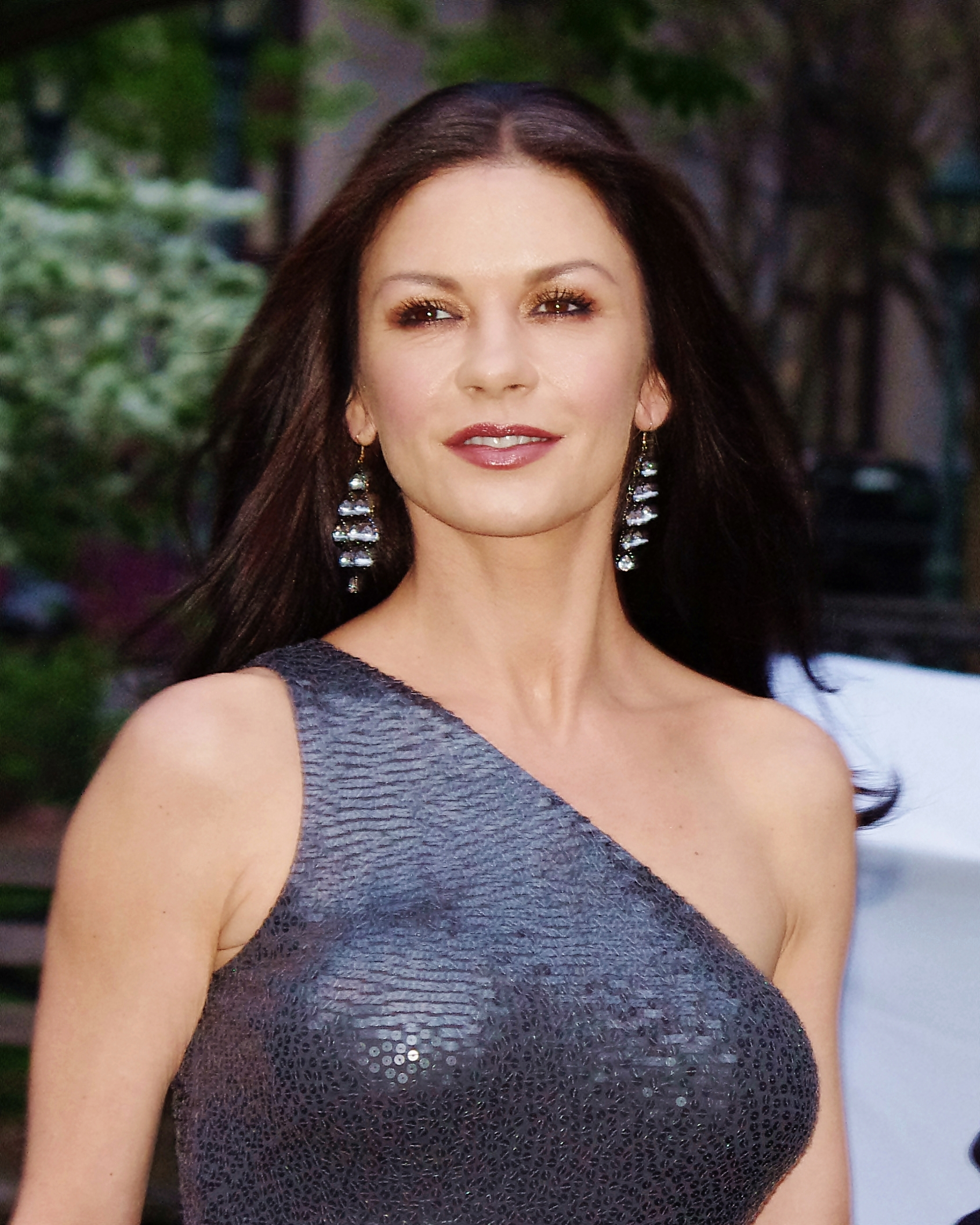
Catherine Zeta-Jones, born in Swansea

The earliest surviving Welsh plays are two medieval miracle plays, Y Tri Brenin o Gwlen ("The three Kings from Cologne") and Y Dioddefaint a'r Atgyfodiad ("The Passion and the Resurrection"). A recognised Welsh tradition of theatre emerged during the 18th century, in the form of an interlude, a metrical play performed at fairs and markets. Drama in the early 20th century thrived, but the country established neither a Welsh National Theatre nor a national ballet company. After the Second World War, the substantial number of amateur theatre companies reduced by two-thirds. Competition from television in the mid-20th century led to greater professionalism in the theatre. Plays by Emlyn Williams and Alun Owen and others were staged, while Welsh actors, including Richard Burton and Anthony Hopkins, were establishing international reputations. Wales has also produced some well-known comedians.

==== Dance ====
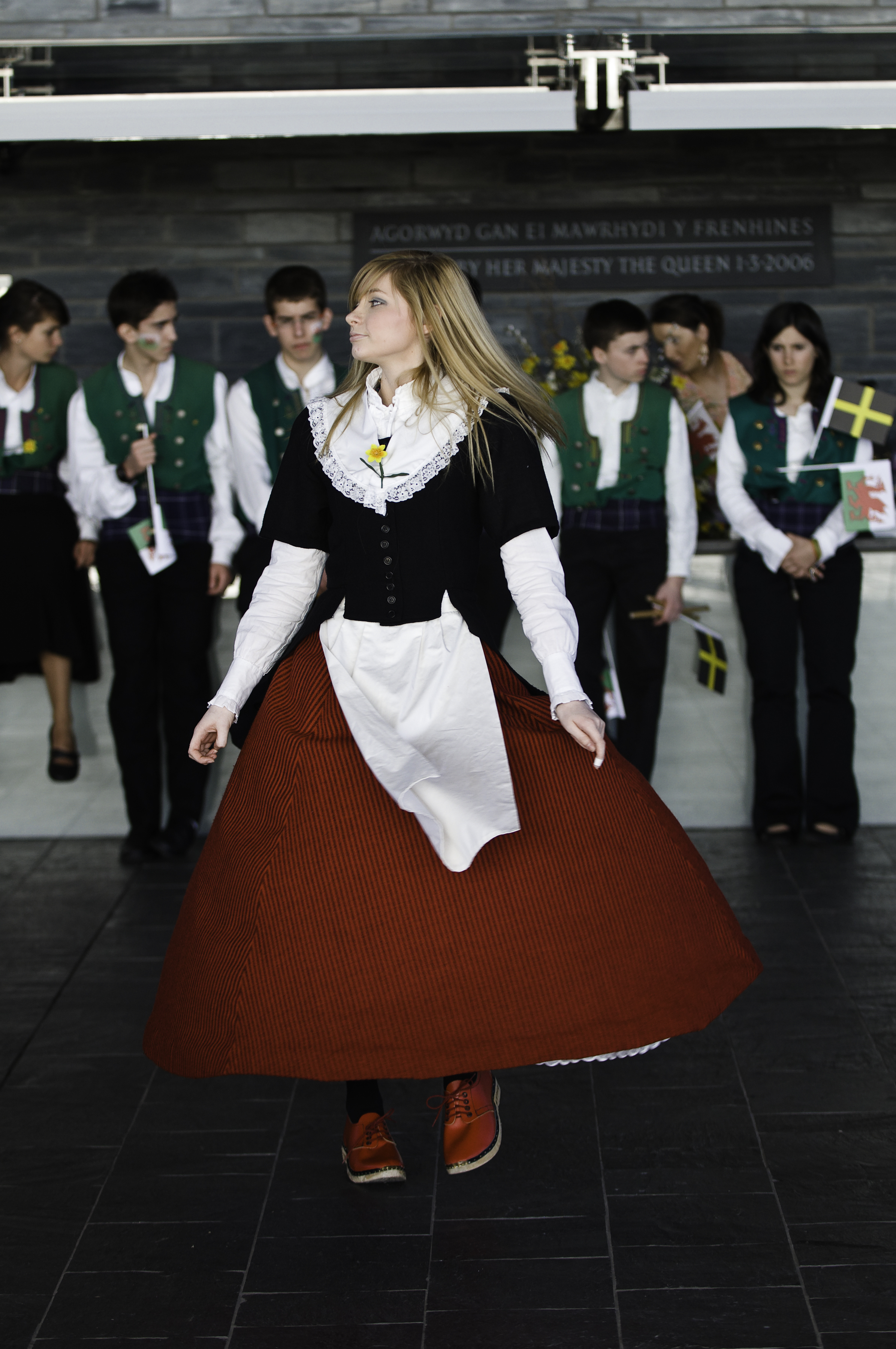
Welsh dancer at the Senedd building

Traditional dances include Welsh folk dancing and clog dancing. The first mention of dancing in Wales is in a 12th-century account by Giraldus Cambrensis, but by the 19th century traditional dance had all but died out due to religious opposition. In the 20th century a revival was led by Lois Blake (1890–1974). Clog dancing was preserved and developed by Hywel Wood (1882–1967) and others who perpetuated the art on local and national stages. The Welsh Folk Dance Society was founded in 1949. Contemporary dance grew out of Cardiff in the 1970s. The National Dance Company Wales, formed in 1983, is now resident at the Wales Millennium Centre.

=== Cuisine ===
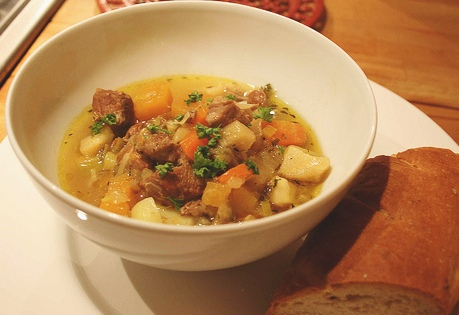
Cawl, a traditional meat and vegetable dish from Wales.

Traditional Welsh dishes include laverbread (made from Porphyra umbilicalis, an edible seaweed), bara brith (fruit bread), cawl (a lamb stew), cawl cennin (leek soup), and Welsh cakes. Cockles are sometimes served as a traditional breakfast with bacon and laverbread. Although Wales has its own traditional food and has absorbed much of the cuisine of England, Welsh diets now owe more to the countries of India, China and the United States. Chicken tikka masala is the country's favourite dish, while hamburgers and Chinese food outsell fish and chips as takeaways.

=== Sport ===
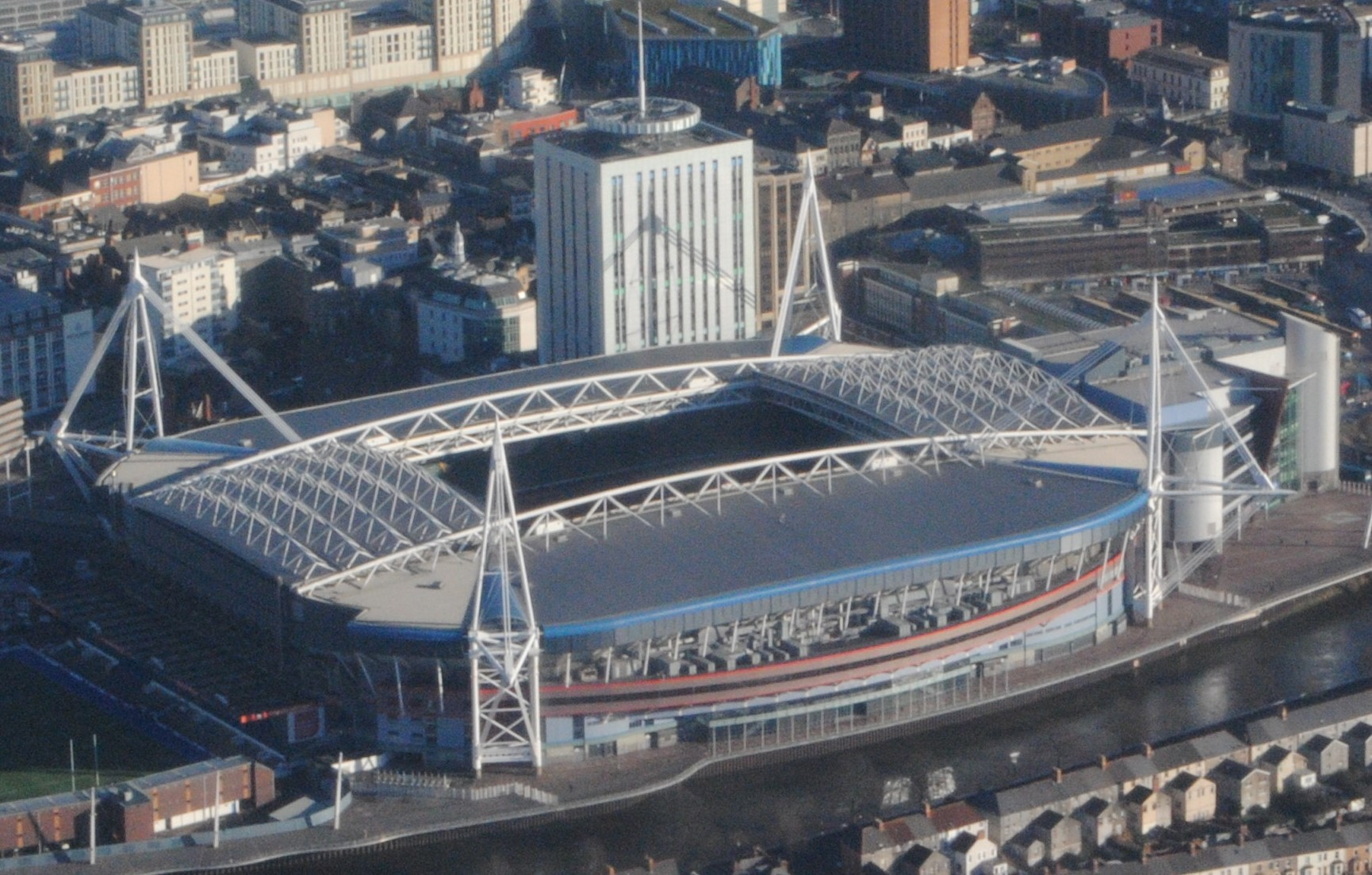
Millennium Stadium, Cardiff

More than 50 national governing bodies regulate and organise their sports in Wales. Most of those involved in competitive sports select, organise and manage individuals or teams to represent their country at international events or fixtures against other countries. Wales is represented at major world sporting events such as the FIFA World Cup, Rugby World Cup, Rugby League World Cup and the Commonwealth Games. At the Olympic Games, Welsh athletes compete alongside those of Scotland, England and Northern Ireland as part of a Great Britain team. Wales has hosted several international sporting events. These include the 1958 Commonwealth Games, the 1999 Rugby World Cup, the 2010 Ryder Cup and the 2017 UEFA Champions League Final.

Although football has traditionally been the more popular sport in North Wales, rugby union is seen as a symbol of Welsh identity and an expression of national consciousness. The Wales national rugby union team takes part in the annual Six Nations Championship and has also competed in every Rugby World Cup, hosting the tournament in 1999. The five professional sides that replaced the traditional club sides in major competitions in 2003 were replaced in 2004 by the four regions: Cardiff Blues, Dragons, Ospreys and Scarlets. The Welsh regional teams play in the United Rugby Championship, the Heineken Champions Cup if they qualify and the European Rugby Challenge Cup, again dependent on qualification. Rugby league in Wales dates back to 1907. A professional Welsh League existed from 1908 to 1910.

Wales has had its own football league, the Welsh Premier League, since 1992. For historical reasons, five Welsh clubs play in the English football league system: Cardiff City, Swansea City, Newport County, Wrexham, and Merthyr Town. The country has produced a considerable number of footballers who have played at international level. At UEFA Euro 2016, the Wales national team achieved their best ever finish, reaching the semi-finals.

In international cricket, Wales and England field a single representative team, administered by the England and Wales Cricket Board (ECB), called the England cricket team, or simply 'England'. Occasionally, a separate Wales team play limited-overs competitions. Glamorgan County Cricket Club is the only Welsh participant in the England and Wales County Championship. Wales has produced notable participants of individual sports including snooker, track and field, cycling, and boxing.

=== National symbols and identity ===
The red dragon, a popular symbol in Wales.

Wales is regarded as a modern Celtic nation which contributes to its national identity, with Welsh artists regularly appearing at Celtic festivals. The red dragon is the principal symbol of national identity and pride, personifying the fearlessness of the Welsh nation. The dragon is first referenced in literature as a symbol of the people in the Historia Brittonum. Vortigern (Welsh: Gwrtheyrn), King of the Celtic Britons, is interrupted while attempting to build a fort at Dinas Emrys. He is told by Ambrosius (Note: "Latin: Ambrosius vocor, id est, Embreis Guletic., lit. '"I am called Ambrosius, that is Embreis Guletic"'. Embreis Guletic is probably Emrys Gwledig.) to dig up two dragons beneath the castle. He discovers a red dragon representing the Celtic Britons, and a white dragon representing Anglo-Saxons. Ambrosius prophesies that the Celtic Britons will reclaim the island and push the Anglo-Saxons back to the sea.

As an emblem, the red dragon of Wales has been used since the reign of Cadwaladr, King of Gwynedd from around 655 AD, and appears prominently on the national flag of Wales, which became an official flag in 1959. The banner of Owain Glyndŵr is associated with Welsh nationhood; it was carried into battle by Welsh forces during Glyndŵr's battles against the English, and includes four lions on red and gold. The standard is similar to the arms of Llywelyn ap Gruffudd (Llywelyn the Last), the last Prince of Wales before the conquest of Wales by Edward I of England. The design may also be influenced by the arms of Glyndŵr's parents, both of whom had lions in their arms. Owain Glyndŵr Day is celebrated on 16 September in Wales and there have been calls to make it a national bank holiday. The Prince of Wales's feathers is also used in Wales: it consists of three white feathers emerging from a gold coronet, and the German motto Ich dien (I serve). Several Welsh representative teams, including the Welsh rugby union, and Welsh regiments in the British Army, including the Royal Welsh, use the badge or a stylised version of it. (Note: Wales is not separately represented on the Union Jack as, at the time of the flag's creation, Wales was considered part of England.)

On 1 March, Welsh people celebrate Saint David's Day, commemorating the death of the country's patron saint in 589. It is not a recognised bank holiday although there have been calls to make it so. The day is celebrated by schools and cultural societies across Wales, and customs include the wearing of a leek or a daffodil, which are two national emblems of Wales. Children also wear the national costume. The origins of the leek can be traced to the 16th century, while the daffodil became popular in the 19th century, encouraged by David Lloyd George. This is attributed to confusion (or association) between the Welsh word for leeks, cennin, and that for daffodils, cennin Pedr or St. Peter's leeks. A report in 1916 gave preference to the leek, which has appeared on British pound coins. Other Welsh festivals include Mabsant, when parishes would celebrate the patron saint of their local church, although this is now rarely observed, and a more modern celebration, Dydd Santes Dwynwen (St Dwynwen's Day), observed on 25 January in a similar way to St Valentine's Day.

"Hen Wlad Fy Nhadau" (Welsh for 'land of my fathers') is the de facto national anthem of Wales and is played at events such as football or rugby matches involving the Wales national team, as well as the opening of the Senedd and other official occasions. "Cymru am byth" ('Wales forever') is a popular Welsh motto. Another Welsh motto "Y Ddraig Goch Ddyry Cychwyn" ('the red dragon inspires action') has been used on the Royal Badge of Wales since it was created in 1953.

== See also ==
- Outline of Wales
