= .cymru =

Internet top-level domain for Wales

- Introduced: 31 July 2014
- TLD type: GeoTLD
- Status: Available and active as of September 2014
- Intended use: Entities connected with Wales and the Welsh language
- Actual use: Used in Wales, often when the primary or content language is Welsh, such as www.s4c.cymru
- Registration restrictions: Unknown
- Documents: Policies
- Dispute policies: UDRP
- DNSSEC: Yes
- Registry website: Nominet: Cymru - Wales and Our Home Online (Domain for Wales)

.cymru is one of two geographic top level domains (GeoTLD) for Wales (the other being .wales). The word Cymru means Wales in Welsh.

== Proposal and use ==
The TLD was proposed by the British internet registry company Nominet, which runs the domain for the UK (.uk) since 1996. The proposal initially ran into conflict with .cym, proposed by the Wales-based, not-for-profit dotCYM organisation, which advocates for the Welsh language and culture. (.cym was ultimately assigned to the Cayman Islands.)

In June 2014, final go-ahead for the domains was granted by ICANN, and a phased launch of the new domains began. Initially, the new domains were available to trademark holders, with full availability originally planned for the spring of 2015.

On 30 September 2014, the Llywydd of the Senedd officially moved Senedd websites and other sites to new ".cymru" and ".wales" domains which are geographic top-level domains specific to Wales. Wales Online, Daily Post, the Welsh Rugby Union, the Millennium Stadium, Golwg360, Bloc, Gwalia, Atlantic PLC, Orchard and Portmeirion were among others who also switched over to the domains. These became available to all on St David's Day 2015.

== See also ==
- .scot
- .bzh
- .cat
- .eus
- .gal
- .quebec
